= 1857 in Norway =

- Centuries: 17th; 18th; 19th; 20th; 21st
- Decades: 1830s; 1840s; 1850s; 1860s; 1870s
- See also: 1857 in Sweden; List of years in Norway

Events in the year 1857 in Norway.

== Incumbents ==
- Monarch: Oscar I.
- First Minister: Jørgen Herman Vogt

== Events ==
- 6 June – Sophia of Nassau marries the future King Oscar II of Sweden-Norway
- The town of Steinkjer is founded.
- The town of Skudeneshavn is founded.

== Births ==
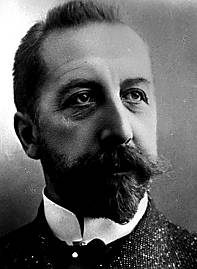
Christian Michelsen

- 4 January – John N. Kildahl, Norwegian-American Lutheran church minister, author and educator (died 1920)
- 15 March – Christian Michelsen, shipping magnate, politician and Prime Minister of Norway (died 1925)
- 6 April – Per Sivle, poet, novelist, newspaper editor (died 1904).
- 13 April – Fanny Ingvoldstad, painter (died 1935).
- 27 April – Theodor Kittelsen, artist (died 1914)
- 8 May – Agnes Mathilde Wergeland, Norwegian-American historian and poet (died 1914)
- 2 June – Urban Jacob Rasmus Børresen, rear admiral (died 1943)
- 28 July – Andreas Thidemand Carlsen Ruud, politician
- 19 August – Haldor Børve, architect (died 1933).
- 21 October- Frederick William Cappelen, Norwegian American architect and civil engineer (died 1921)
- 10 November – Aad J. Vinje, Chief Justice of the Wisconsin Supreme Court (died 1929)
- 18 November – Gunnar Heiberg, playwright (died 1929)

=== Full date unknown ===
- Waldemar Hansteen, architect (died 1921)
- Johan Peter Jacobson, politician

== Deaths ==
- 16 April – Ferdinand Carl Maria Wedel-Jarlsberg, commanding general of the Norwegian Army (born 1781)
- 11 June – Jens Rynning, priest (born 1778)
- 14 October – Johan Christian Dahl, painter (born 1788)
- 28 October – Hother Erich Werner Bøttger, politician (born 1801)

=== Full date unknown ===
- Diderik Bøgvad, politician (born 1792)
