= 1867 in Norway =

- Centuries: 17th; 18th; 19th; 20th; 21st
- Decades: 1840s; 1850s; 1860s; 1870s; 1880s
- See also: 1867 in Sweden; List of years in Norway

Events in the year 1867 in Norway.

== Incumbents ==
- Monarch: Charles IV.
- First Minister: Frederik Stang

== Arts and literature ==
- Peer Gynt a five-act play in verse was written by the Norwegian dramatist Henrik Ibsen. It is one of Ibsen's best known and most widely performed plays.

== Births ==
=== January to June ===
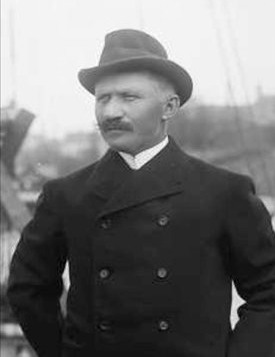
Hjalmar Johansen

- 19 January – Isak Kobro Collett, politician (died 1911)
- 20 January – Mons Monssen, sailor in the United States Navy who received the Medal of Honor (died 1930)
- 29 January – Carl L. Boeckmann, artist (died 1923)
- 5 March – Ingebrigt Vik, sculptor (died 1927)
- 15 May – Hjalmar Johansen, polar explorer (died 1913)

=== July to December ===
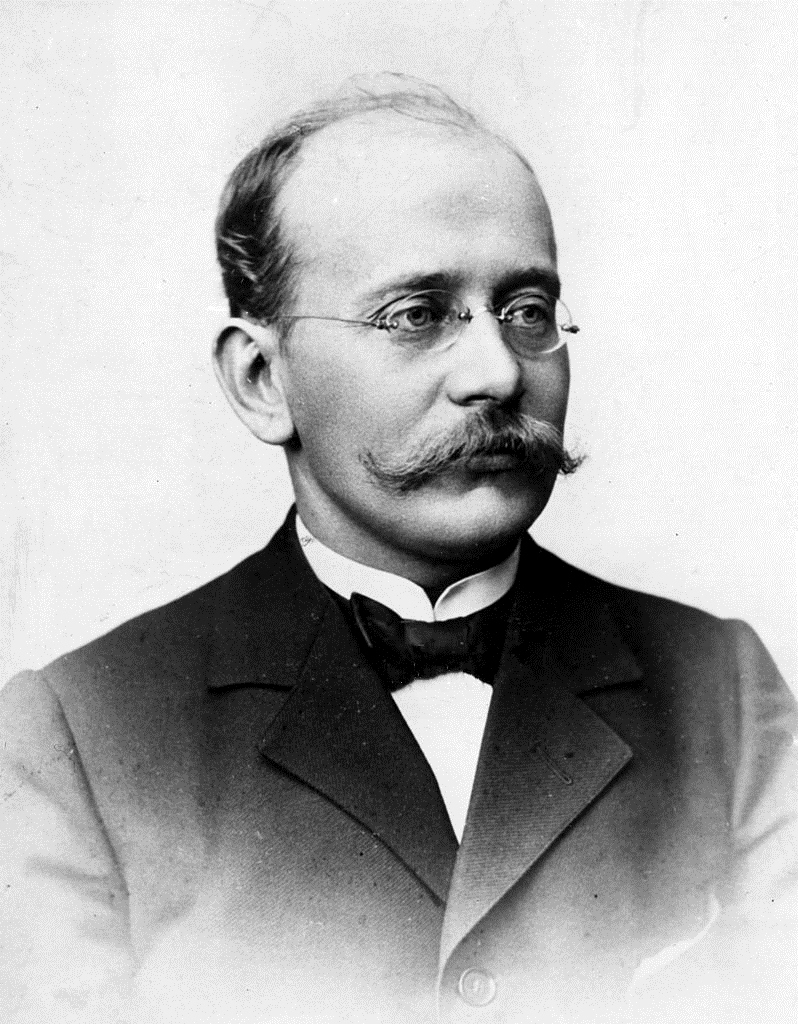
Kristian Birkeland

- 2 July – Hjalmar Krag, businessman and sports official (died 1954).
- 24 July – Olav Kringen, newspaper editor (died 1951).
- 27 July – Mikal Angell Jacobus Landmark, politician (died 1939)
- 29 July – Regine Normann, teacher and writer (died 1939).
- 2 August – Johanne Dybwad, actress (died 1950).
- 15 August – Anathon Aall, academic (died 1943)
- 8 October – Christian Hansen Wollnick, newspaper editor, jurist and politician (died 1936)
- 4 November – Martin Julius Halvorsen, newspaper editor and politician
- 10 December – Lauritz Christiansen, sailor and Olympic gold medallist (died 1930)
- 13 December – Kristian Birkeland, scientist (died 1917)
- 27 December – Fredrik Stang, politician and Minister (died 1941)

=== Full date unknown ===
- Hauk Aabel, comedian and actor (died 1961)
- Barthold Hansteen Cranner, botanist (died 1925)
- Johan Fahlstrøm, actor and theatre manager (died 1938)
- Alfred Klingenberg, pianist (died 1944)
- Wilhelm Christian Magelssen, politician and Minister (died 1930)
- Kristian Friis Petersen, politician and Minister (died 1932)

== Deaths ==
- 24 June - Paul Andreas Kaald, navy officer and businessman (born 1784)
- 14 August – Bersvend Martinussen Røkkum, politician (born 1806)
- 12 September – Hans Eleonardus Møller, politician and businessperson (born 1804)
- 24 November – Peter Bøyesen, businessperson and politician (born 1799)

=== Full date unknown ===
- Jørgen Flood, merchant and politician (born 1792)
- Hans Kiær, politician (born 1795)
- Hans Andersen Kiær, businessperson and politician (born 1795)
