= 1881 in Norway =

- Centuries: 17th; 18th; 19th; 20th; 21st
- Decades: 1860s; 1870s; 1880s; 1890s; 1900s
- See also: 1881 in Sweden; List of years in Norway

Events in the year 1881 in Norway.

== Incumbents ==
- Monarch: Oscar II .
- Prime Minister: Christian August Selmer

== Events ==
- More than 600 Norwegians sign on as contract laborers for sugar plantations in Hawaii, making a four month journey to the islands.

== Arts and literature ==
- Norwegian playwright, Henrik Ibsen's, Ghosts, is released.

== Births ==
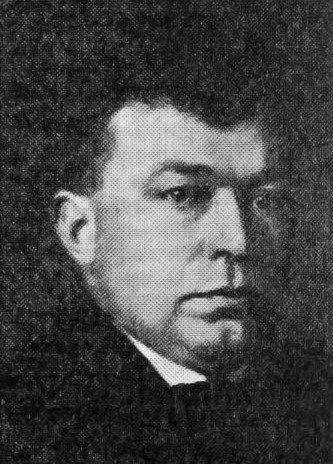
Oskar Braaten

=== January to June ===
- 3 January – Wilhelm Faye, military officer and war historian (died 1967).
- 5 January – Jørgen Bru, sport shooter (died 1974)
- 24 February – Per Askim, naval officer (died 1963).
- 27 February – Sigvard Sivertsen, gymnast and Olympic gold medallist (died 1963)
- 11 March – Wictor Esbensen, mariner and explorer (died 1942)
- 17 March – Kristian Elster, Jr, novelist, literary historian, theatre critic and biographer (born 1881).
- 20 March – Dorthea Dahl, writer in America (died 1958)
- 26 March – Marta Marie Nielsen, schoolteacher and politician (d. 1948).
- 28 April – Carl Bonnevie, jurist and politician (died 1972).
- 6 June – Anton Djupvik, politician (died 1951)

=== July to December ===
- 23 July – Thorleiv Røhn, military officer, gymnast and Olympic gold medallist (died 1963)
- 3 August – Elias Corneliussen, naval officer (died 1951).
- 27 August – Elise Hambro, educator (died 1966).
- 13 September – Carl Bugge, geologist (died 1968).
- 15 September – Wilhelm Blystad, track and field athlete (died 1954)
- 11 October – Leif Georg Ferdinand Bang, politician
- 25 October – Oskar Braaten, novelist and playwright (died 1939)
- 27 October – Edvard Larsen, triple jumper and Olympic bronze medallist (died 1914)
- 29 October – Niels Christian Ditleff, diplomat (died 1956)
- 7 November – Rikard Berge, folklorist (died 1969).
- 15 November – Andreas Hagelund, gymnast and Olympic gold medallist (died 1967)
- 4 December – Edvard Bull, Sr., historian and politician (died 1932)
- 17 December – Yngvar Bryn, track and field athlete and pairs figure skater (died 1947)
- 27 December – Sigvart Johansen, rifle shooter and Olympic bronze medallist

=== Full date unknown ===
- Erik Glosimodt, architect (died 1921)
- Marie Hamsun, actor and writer (died 1969)
- Sigurd Halvorsen Johannessen, politician (died 1964)
- Per Larssen, politician and Minister (died 1947)
- Knut Liestøl, politician and Minister (died 1952)
- Kristian Prestrud, polar explorer (died 1927)
- Jakob Sverdrup, philologist and lexicographer (died 1938)

== Deaths ==
- 7 January – Jens Zetlitz Kielland, consul and artist (born 1816)
- 11 April – Kristian Elster, Sr, novelist, journalist, literary critic and theatre critic (born 1841).

=== Full date unknown ===
- Jens Henrik Beer, businessperson, farmer and politician (born 1799)
- Jens Gran, politician (born 1794)
- Christopher Andreas Holmboe, philologist (born 1796)
- Peter Daniel B. W. Kildal, politician (born 1816)
- Thomas Konow, naval officer and politician (born 1796)
- Ludvig Vibe, philologist and educator (born 1803)
