= 1874 in Norway =

- Centuries: 17th; 18th; 19th; 20th; 21st
- Decades: 1850s; 1860s; 1870s; 1880s; 1890s
- See also: 1874 in Sweden; List of years in Norway

Events in the year 1874 in Norway.

== Incumbents ==
- Monarch: Oscar II .
- Prime Minister: Frederik Stang

== Events ==
- The Grand Hotel in Oslo is founded.
- The Norwegian Society of Graduate Technical and Scientific Professionals, a union for graduate technical and scientific professionals, is founded.

== Births ==
- 12 April – Kristian Edland, farmer and politician.
- 8 May – Endre Johannes Cleven, settler in Canada (died 1916)
- 2 July – Oluf Wesmann-Kjær, rifle shooter (died 1945)
- 7 July – Eyvind Andersen, judge (died 1939).
- 14 July – Torleiv Hannaas, philologist (died 1929)
- 24 August – Einar Hanssen, judge.
- 3 September – Carl Størmer, mathematician and physicist (died 1957)
- 8 September – Torgrim Castberg, violinist (died 1928)
- 26 September – Simon Johnson, Norwegian-American author (died 1970)
- 2 December – Johannes Hanssen, bandmaster, composer and teacher (died 1967)
- 13 December – Marius Ormestad, trade unionist and civil servant (died 1964).
- 19 December – Axel Theodor Næss, judge (d. 1945).

=== Full date unknown ===
- Aagot Didriksen, actress (died 1968)
- Knut Olai Thornæs, newspaper editor and politician (died 1935)

== Deaths ==
- 20 February – Dominicus Nagell Lemvig Brun, military officer and politician (b.1790)
- 1 March – Hans Jørgen Darre, clergyman (b.1803)
- 5 June – Johan Henrik Andresen, merchant, factory owner and politician (born 1815).
- 15 September – Christian Schou, brewer and merchant (born 1792).
- 6 October – Thomas Tellefsen, pianist and composer (b.1823)

=== Full date unknown ===
- Jens Lauritz Arup, politician (b.1793)
- Ole Ingebrigtsen Soelberg, politician (b.1798)
- Carl Johan Severin Steen, politician (b.1825)
