= 1798 in Norway =

- Centuries: 16th; 17th; 18th; 19th; 20th
- Decades: 1770s; 1780s; 1790s; 1800s; 1810s
- See also: 1798 in Denmark; List of years in Norway

Events in the year 1798 in Norway.

== Incumbents ==
- Monarch: Christian VII.

== Events ==
- 17 February - The French corvette Cérès was wrecked on the shores of Norway.
- 18 July - The town of Egersund is founded.
- The town of Sogndal is founded (lost town status in 1944).

== Births ==
- 10 February - Niels Nielsen Vogt, priest and politician (d.1869)
- 17 July - Aslak Reiersen Midhassel, politician (d.1882)
- 25 August - Christian Halvorsen Svenkerud, politician (d.1886)
- 8 October - Hans Holmboe, educator and politician (d.1868)
- 14 November - Peder Carl Lasson, jurist and politician (d.1873)

=== Full date unknown ===
- Christian Peder Bianco Boeck, doctor, zoologist and mountaineer (d.1877)
- Harald Kolbeinson Guddal, politician (d.1887)
- Nils Isachsen Kulstad, politician
- Ole Ingebrigtsen Soelberg, politician (d.1874)
- Lars Bastian Ridder Stabell, politician (d.1860)
