= 1876 in Norway =

- Centuries: 17th; 18th; 19th; 20th; 21st
- Decades: 1850s; 1860s; 1870s; 1880s; 1890s
- See also: 1876 in Sweden; List of years in Norway

Events in the year 1876 in Norway.

== Incumbents ==
- Monarch: Oscar II .
- Prime Minister: Frederik Stang

== Events ==
- 22 February - Sofie Johannesdotter was beheaded by axe for trifold murder, she was the last woman to be executed in Norway.
- 25 February - Kristoffer Nilsen Svartbækken Grindalen was beheaded by axe for murder, it was witnessed by estimated 2,500 spectators, it was the last public execution in Norway.

== Births ==
=== January to June ===
- 8 January – Nils Tveit, politician (died 1949)
- 31 January – Mette Bull, actress (died 1946)
- 23 March – Nils Erik Flakstad, businessperson and politician (died 1939)
- 22 April – Ole Edvart Rølvaag, novelist and professor in America (died 1931)
- 9 May – Johan Arndt, politician (died 1933)
- 18 May – Thorvald Astrup, architect (died 1940)
- 11 June – Christen Gran Bøgh, jurist, tourism promoter and theatre critic (died 1955)

=== July to December ===
- 17 August – Henny Astrup, actress (died 1961)
- 22 August – Christen Wiese, sailor and Olympic gold medallist (died 1968)
- 16 September – Albert Helgerud, rifle shooter and Olympic gold medallist (died 1954)
- 24 September – Jacob Thorkelson, elected official, naval officer and medical doctor in America (died 1945)
- 18 October – Erik Colban, diplomat (died 1956)
- 19 October – Oluf Christian Müller, politician (died 1938)
- 21 November – Olav Duun, novelist (died 1939)
- 8 December – Jan Østervold, sailor and Olympic gold medallist (died 1945)

=== Full date unknown ===
- Edvin Alten, judge (died 1967)
- Olaf Amundsen, politician and Minister (died 1939)
- Sverre Hassel, polar explorer (died 1928)
- Lars Olai Meling, politician and Minister (died 1951)
- Embrik Strand, arachnologist (died 1947)
- Ole Nikolai Ingebrigtsen Strømme, politician and Minister (died 1936)

== Deaths ==
- 18 January – Asbjorn Kloster, social reformer and leader of the Norwegian temperance movement (born 1823)
- 22 February - Sofie Johannesdotter, serial killer (born 1839)
- 25 February - Kristoffer Nilsen Svartbækken Grindalen, criminal, killer and thief (born 1804)
- 8 May – Christian Lassen, orientalist (born 1800)
- 20 July - Hans Riddervold, bishop and politician (born 1795)

=== Full date unknown ===
- Karelius August Arntzen, politician (born 1802)
- Eilev Jonsson Steintjønndalen, Hardanger fiddle maker (born 1821)
