= 1872 in Norway =

- Centuries: 17th; 18th; 19th; 20th; 21st
- Decades: 1850s; 1860s; 1870s; 1880s; 1890s
- See also: 1872 in Sweden; List of years in Norway

Events in the year 1872 in Norway.

== Incumbents ==
- Monarch: Charles IV (until 18 September), then Oscar II.
- First Minister: Frederik Stang

== Events ==
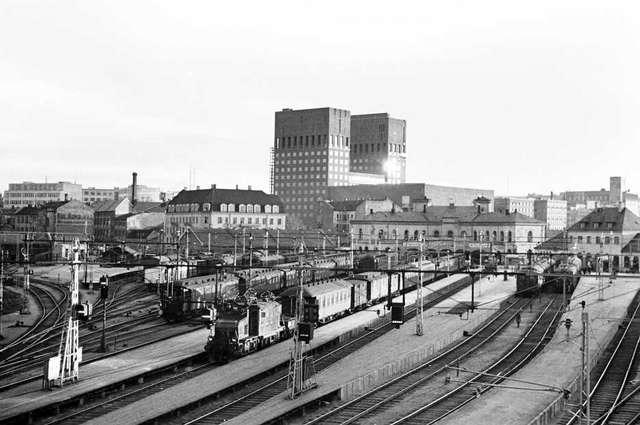
Oslo Vestbanestasjon (Oslo V) opens

- 18 September – King Oscar II accedes to the throne of Sweden-Norway.
- 7 October – The railway line Drammenbanen between Oslo and Drammen is opened.
- Oslo Vestbanestasjon (Oslo V) opens.

== Notable births ==
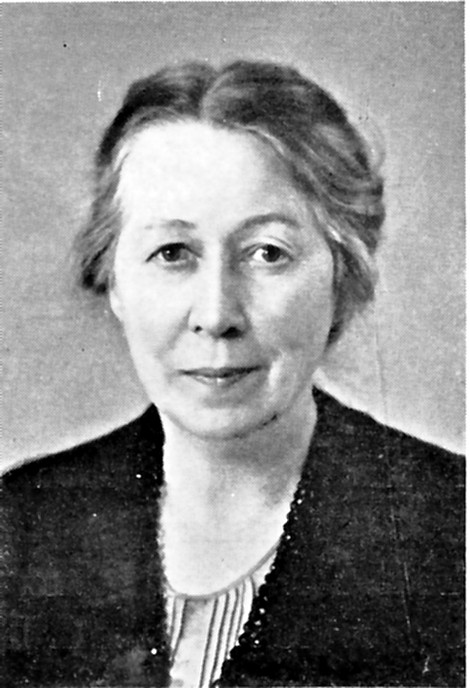
Anna Sethne

- 7 January – Olaf Sæther, rifle shooter and Olympic gold medallist (died 1945)
- 9 January – Ivar Lykke, politician and Prime Minister of Norway (died 1949)
- 6 March – Johan Bojer, novelist and dramatist (died 1959)
- 7 April – Hendrik Christian Andersen, sculptor, painter and urban planner in America (died 1940)
- 12 April – Marie Karsten, interior designer (died 1953).
- 29 April – Eyvind Alnæs, composer, pianist, organist and choir director (died 1932)
- 7 May – Peder Østlund, speed skater (died 1939)
- 28 May – Otto Bahr Halvorsen, politician and twice Prime Minister of Norway (died 1923)
- 9 June – Olaf Bryn, politician (died 1948)
- 10 June – Harald Natvig, rifle shooter and Olympic gold medallist (died 1947)
- 5 July – Sten Abel, sailor and Olympic silver medallist (died 1942)
- 16 July – Roald Amundsen, polar explorer, led the first Antarctic expedition to reach the South Pole (died 1928)
- 3 August – Haakon VII, King of Norway (died 1957)
- 19 September – Ragnvald Hvoslef, politician (died 1944)
- 25 September – Anna Sethne, educator (died 1961).
- 8 October – Kristine Bonnevie, biologist and Norway's first female professor (died 1948)
- 14 October – Ole Østervold, sailor and Olympic gold medallist (died 1936)
- 17 November – Edvard Engelsaas, speed skater and world champion

=== Full date unknown ===
- Andreas Baalsrud, engineer (died 1961)
- Ingolf Elster Christensen, politician (died 1943)
- Oskar Fredriksen, speed skater (died 1920)
- Einar Halvorsen, speed skater (died 1964)
- Gustav Henriksen, businessperson (died 1939)
- Hjalmar Holand, historian (died 1963)
- Olav Kavli, businessperson and cheese scientist
- Anders Venger, politician and Minister (died 1935)
- Hans Westfal-Larsen, ship-owner
