= 1858 in Norway =

- Centuries: 17th; 18th; 19th; 20th; 21st
- Decades: 1830s; 1840s; 1850s; 1860s; 1870s
- See also: 1858 in Sweden; List of years in Norway

Events in the year 1858 in Norway.

== Incumbents ==
- Monarch: Oscar I.
- First Minister: Hans Christian Petersen

== Events ==
- 14 April – The 1858 Christiania fire. Several city blocks were destroyed, 41 buildings burned down, and around 1,000 persons lost their homes.
- The town of Horten is founded.

== Births ==
=== January to June ===
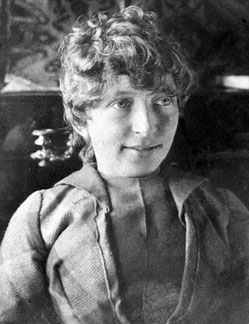
Cecilie Thoresen Krog

- 7 January – Andreas Kaddeland, physician and politician
- 17 February – Hans Georg Jacob Stang, politician and Minister (died 1907)
- 7 March – Cecilie Thoresen Krog, woman’s rights pioneer (died 1911).
- 11 March – Brita Bjørgum, writer, teacher and women's rights activist (died 1906).
- 7 April – Haaken L. Mathiesen, landowner and businessperson (died 1930)
- 19 April – Oddmund Vik, politician (died 1930)
- 9 May – Hanna Hoffmann, sculptor and silversmith (born 1917)
- 10 May – Schak Bull, architect (died 1956)
- 27 June – Magne Johnsen Rongved, politician (died 1933)

=== July to December ===
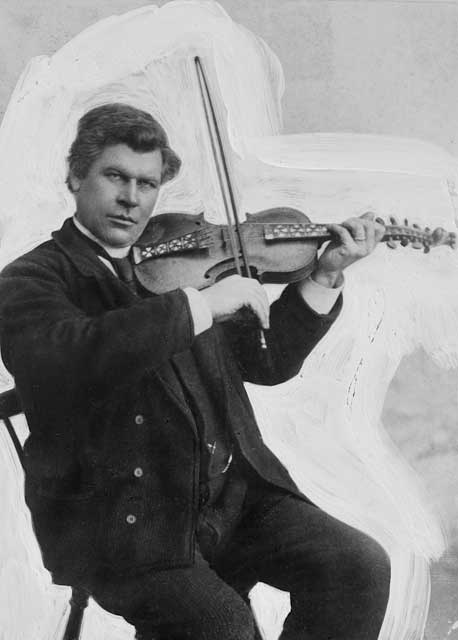
Sjur Helgeland

- 19 August – Sjur Helgeland, fiddler and composer (died 1924).
- 27 August – Per Winge, conductor, pianist and composer (died 1935)
- 24 September – Christian Meidell Kahrs, businessperson and politician
- 28 October – Nordal Wille, botanist (died 1924)
- 29 October – Christian Bendz Kielland, civil servant (died 1934)
- 19 November – Gina Oselio, opera singer (died 1937).
- 26 December – Torolf Prytz, architect, goldsmith and politician (died 1938)

=== Full date unknown ===
- Christian Bjelland I, businessperson (died 1927)
- Gunder Anton Johannesen Jahren, politician and Minister (died 1933)
- Vetle Vislie, educationalist and writer (died 1933)

== Deaths ==
- 10 June – Peter Hersleb Harboe Castberg, priest and politician (born 1794)
- 11 June – Hans Conrad Thoresen, priest and politician (born 1802)
