= 1871 in Norway =

- Centuries: 17th; 18th; 19th; 20th; 21st
- Decades: 1850s; 1860s; 1870s; 1880s; 1890s
- See also: 1871 in Sweden; List of years in Norway

Events in the year 1871 in Norway.

== Incumbents ==
- Monarch: Charles IV.
- First Minister: Frederik Stang

== Events ==
- The first section of the railway line Sørlandet Line is opened.

== Notable births ==
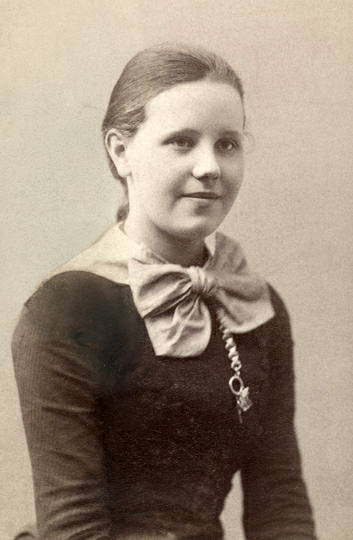
Bokken Lasson

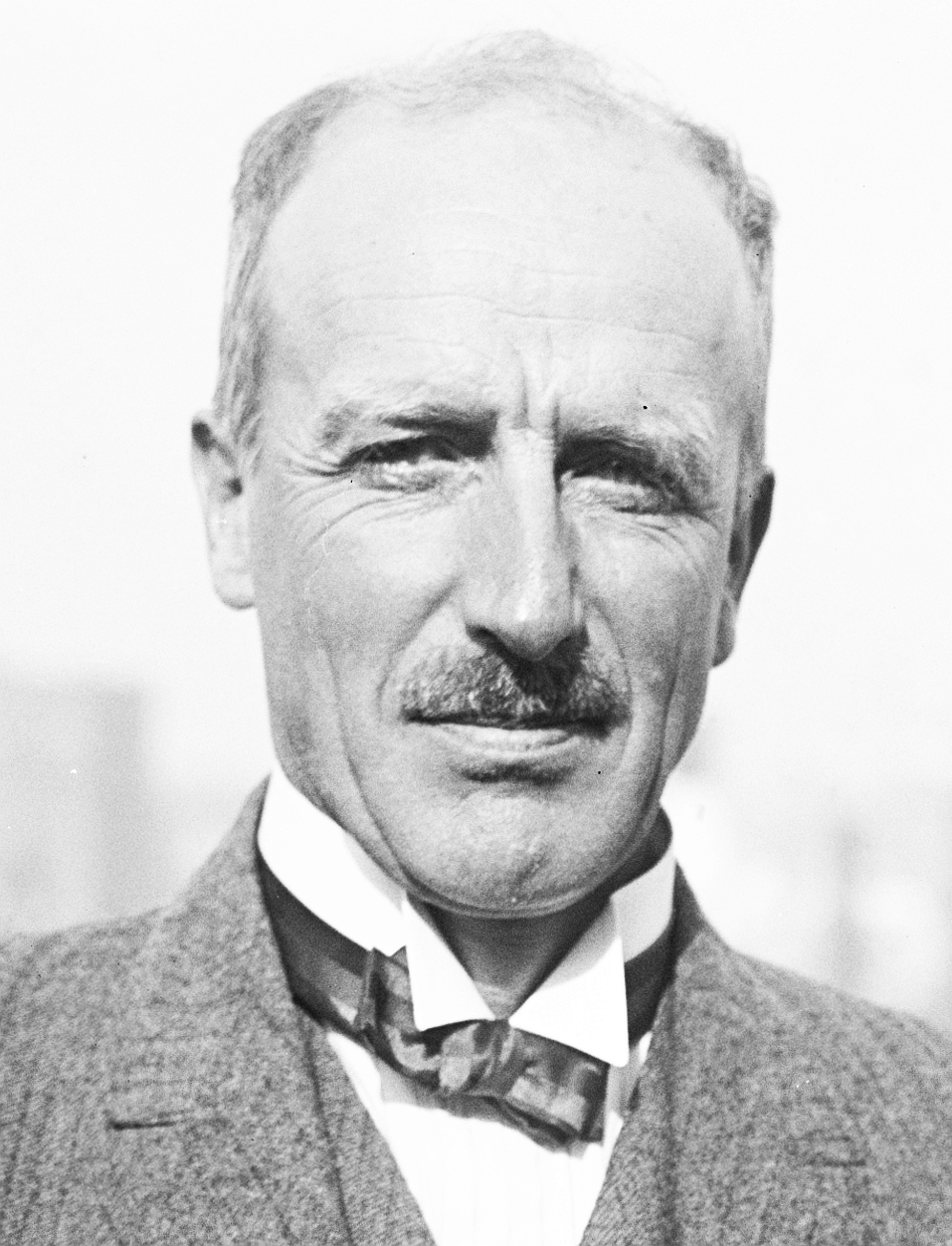
Johan Anker

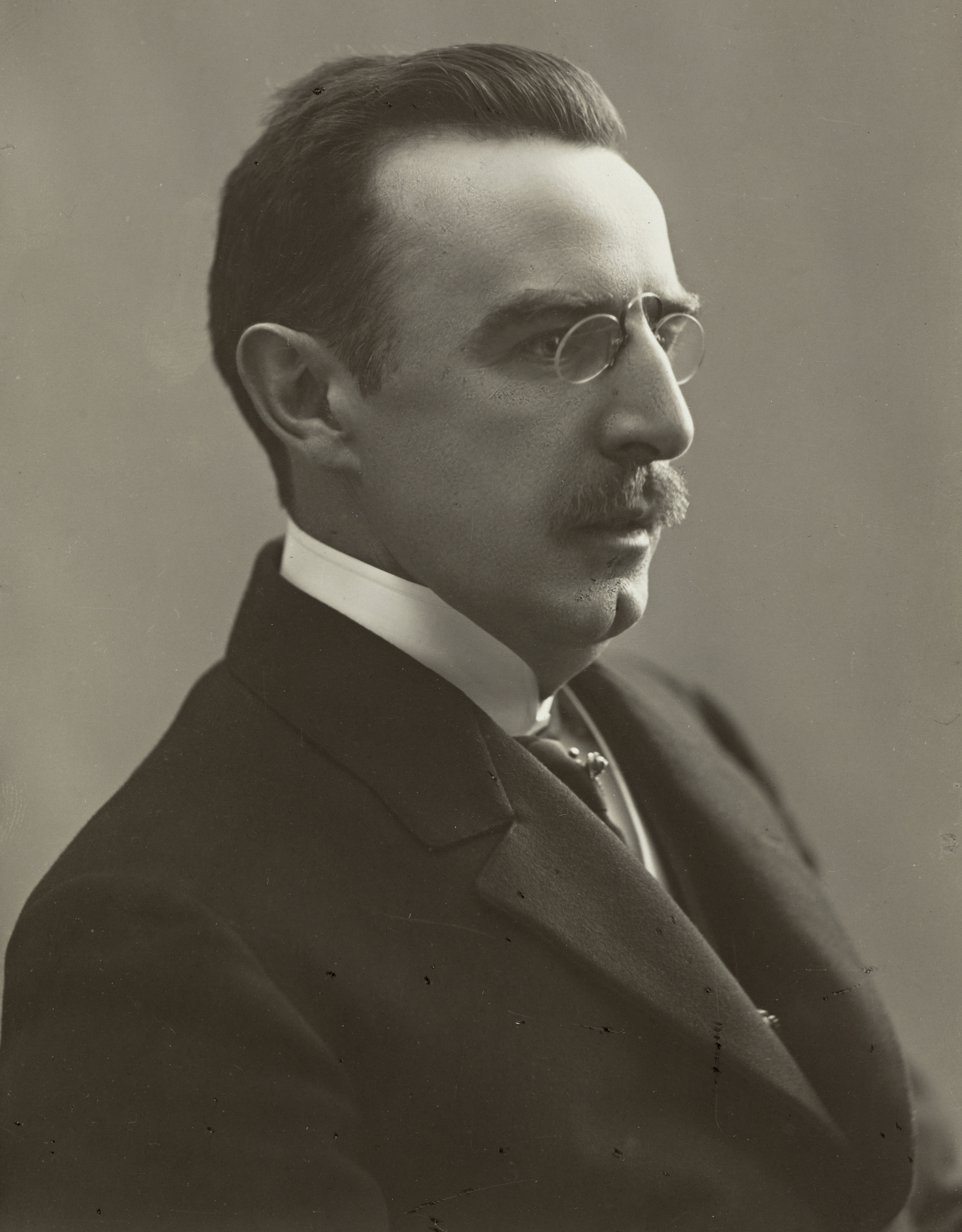
Vilhelm Krag

- 7 January – Bokken Lasson, concert and cabaret singer (died 1970).
- 27 January – Bodil Katharine Biørn, missionary known as Mother Katharine (died 1960)
- 1 February – Helmer Hermandsen, rifle shooter and Olympic silver medallist (died 1958)
- 26 March – Karl Haagensen, gymnast and Olympic gold medallist (died 1918)
- 1 April – F. Melius Christiansen, violinist and choral conductor (died 1955)
- 24 May – Henry Larssen, judge.
- 26 June – Johan Anker, sailor, yacht designer and double Olympic gold medallist (died 1940)
- 22 July – Jon Skeie, jurist (died 1951).
- 31 July – Tilla Valstad, teacher, novelist, journalist (died 1957).
- 11 August – Sofie Schjøtt, jurist (died 1950).
- 17 September – Eivind Astrup, explorer and writer (died 1895).
- 20 September – Jonas Pedersen, politician (died 1953)
- 11 October – Johan Oscar Smith, Christian leader, founder of the Brunstad Christian Church (died 1943)
- 28 October – Sven Moren, writer (died 1938).
- 22 November – Hans Clarin Hovind Mustad, businessperson (died 1948)
- 24 December – Vilhelm Krag, author (died 1933)

=== Full date unknown ===
- Agnar Johannes Barth, forester (died 1948)
- Haakon Hauan, politician and Minister (died 1961)
- Gabriel Kielland, architect, painter and designer (died 1960)
- Odd Sverressøn Klingenberg, politician and Minister (died 1944)
- Magnus Nilssen, politician and Minister (died 1947)

== Notable deaths ==
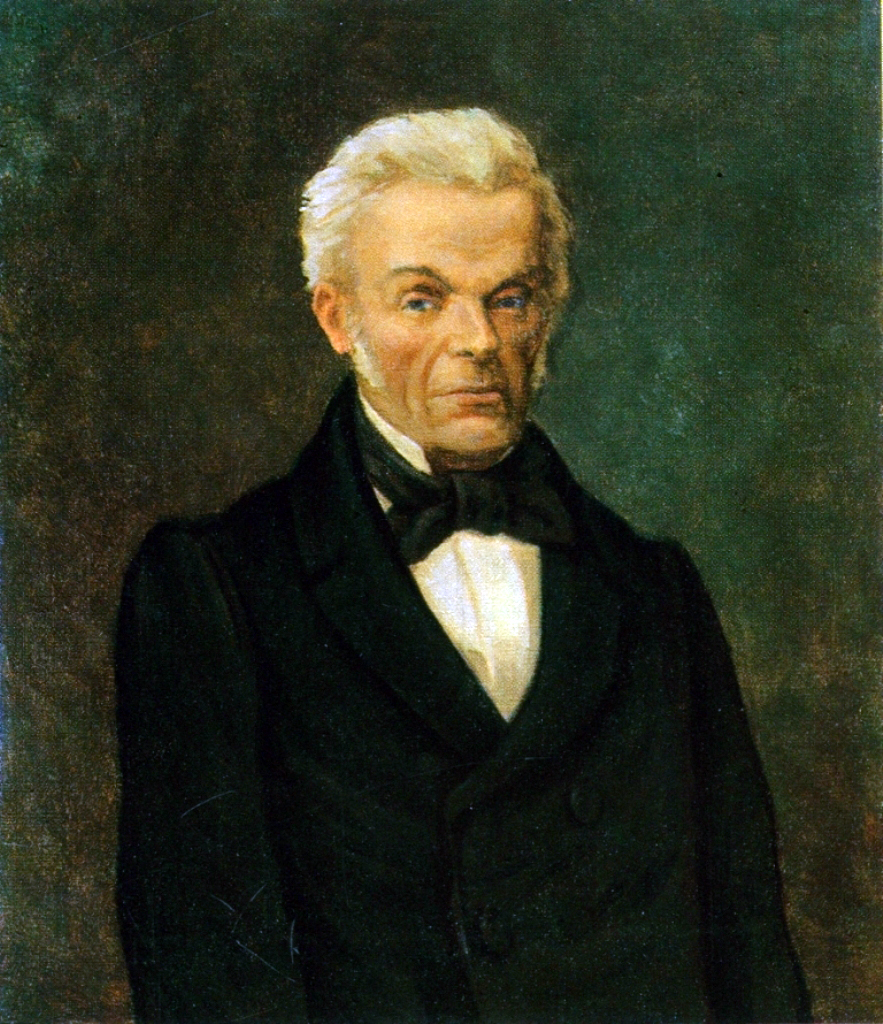
Frederik Holst

- 4 June – Frederik Holst, medical doctor (born 1791).
- 3 July – Carl Andreas Fougstad, politician (born 1806)
- 22 October – Claus Winter Hjelm, judge (born 1797)
