= 1799 in Norway =

- Centuries: 16th; 17th; 18th; 19th; 20th
- Decades: 1770s; 1780s; 1790s; 1800s; 1810s
- See also: 1799 in Denmark; List of years in Norway

Events in the year 1799 in Norway.

== Incumbents ==
- Monarch: Christian VII.

== Events ==
- The coffee manufacturer Friele is established in Bergen.
- Hilchen Sommerschild became the first female teacher in Norway.

== Births ==
- 28 October - Ole Gabriel Gabrielsen Ueland, politician (d.1870)
- 14 November - Ole Edvard Buck, politician (d.1843)

=== Full date unknown ===
- Jens Henrik Beer, politician
- Peter Bøyesen, businessperson and politician (d.1867)
- Borger Christophersen Hoen, politician
- Peder Rasmus Lyng, politician
- Ole Christensen Walstad, politician
