= 1860 in Norway =

- Centuries: 17th; 18th; 19th; 20th; 21st
- Decades: 1840s; 1850s; 1860s; 1870s; 1880s
- See also: 1860 in Sweden; List of years in Norway

Events in the year 1860 in Norway.

== Incumbents ==
- Monarch: Charles IV.
- First Minister: Hans Christian Petersen

== Events ==
- 5 August - Charles XV of Sweden and Louise of the Netherlands was crowned King and Queen of Norway in Trondheim. Louise was the first queen to be crowned in Norway since the Middle Ages.
- The town of Sandnes is founded.
- The town of Florø is founded.

== Births ==
=== January to June ===
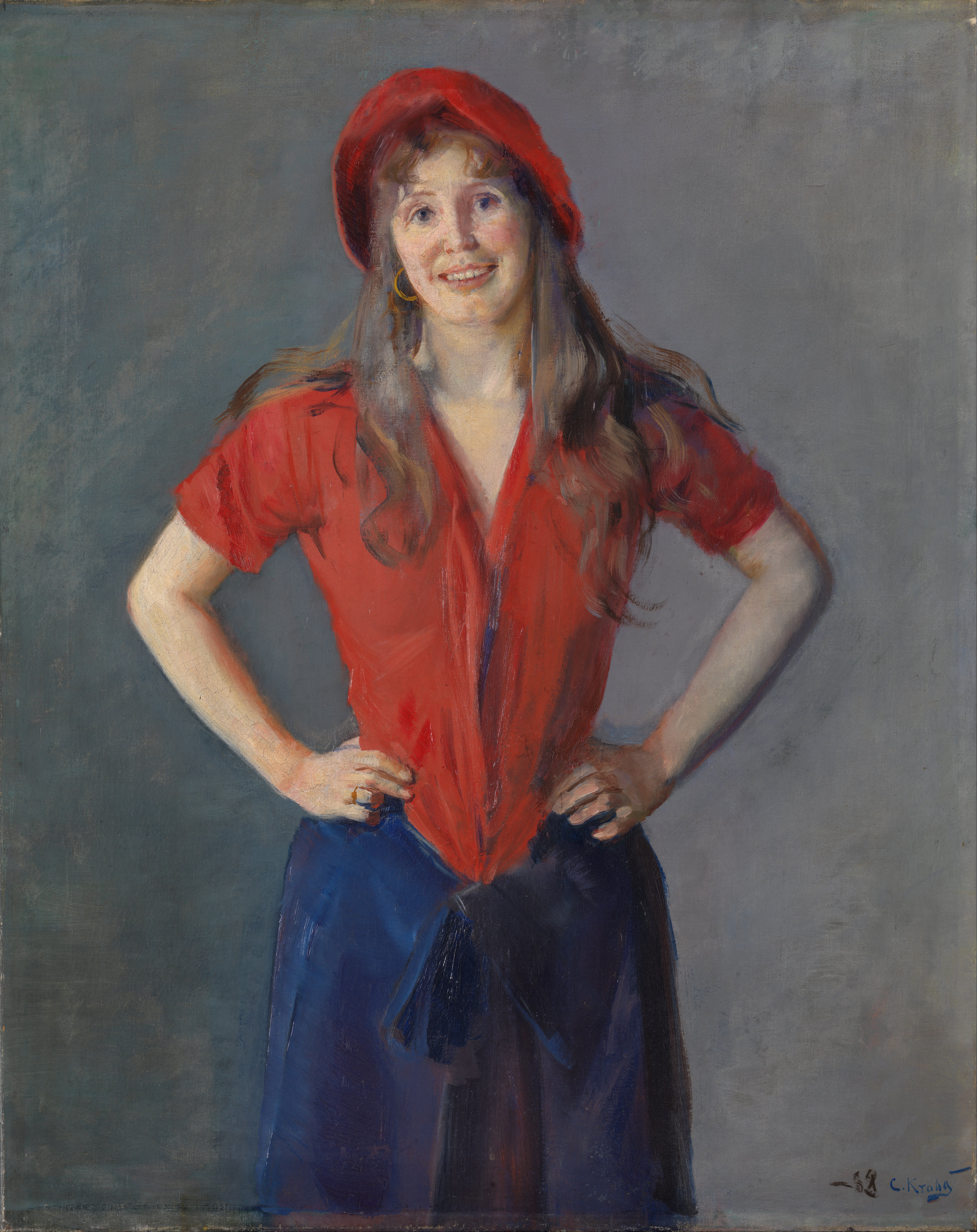
Oda Krohg painted by Christian Krohg

- 17 January – Erik Ramstad, one of the founders of Minot, North Dakota (died 1951)
- 3 February – Rudolf Krefting, physician (died 1942).
- 28 February – Carl Georg Barth, Norwegian-American mathematician and mechanical engineer (died 1939)
- 6 April – Anders Hovden, hymnwriter, priest, author and popular speaker (died 1943)
- 29 April – Bertrand Narvesen, businessperson (died 1939)
- 27 May – Margrethe Munthe, childten's writer and songwriter (died 1931).
- 30 May – Helga Estby, noted for her walk across the United States during 1896 (died 1942)
- 11 June – Oda Krohg, painter (died 1935)
- 30 June – Karl Sigwald Johannes Bull, military officer, politician and Minister (died 1936)

=== July to December ===
- 13 August – Lars Osa, artist (died 1958).
- 20 August – Nils Gregoriussen Skilbred, politician (died 1943)
- 27 August – Carl Anton Larsen, mariner and Antarctic explorer (died 1924)
- 6 September – Axel Holst, professor of hygiene and bacteriology (died 1931)
- 6 October – Olav Johan Sopp, mycologist (died 1931).
- 8 November – Anna Sofie Jakobsen, missionary to China (died 1913)

=== Full date unknown ===
- Harald Bjerke, businessperson (died 1926)

== Deaths ==
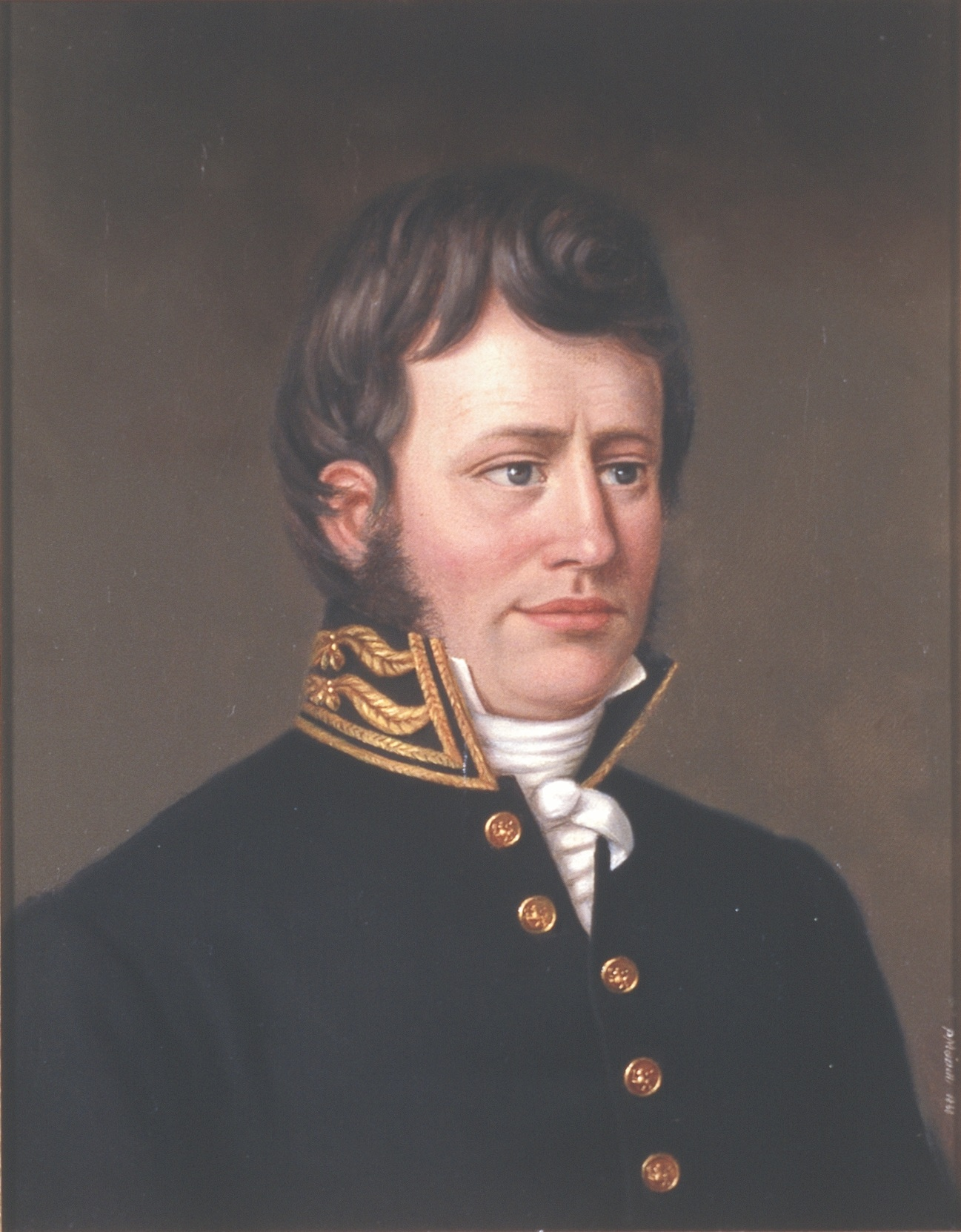
Christian Hersleb Horneman

- 8 March – Lorentz Lange, judge and politician (born 1783)
- 8 April – Hans Eleonardus Møller, Sr., businessperson (born 1780)
- 22 June – Christian Hersleb Horneman, jurist and politician (born 1781).
- 28 July – Per Ivarson Undi, early homesteader in Wisconsin Territory (born 1803)

=== Full date unknown ===
- Ole Wilhelm Erichsen, politician and Minister (born 1793)
- Lars Bastian Ridder Stabell, politician (born 1798)
