= Soelberg =

Soelberg is a surname. Notable people with the surname include:

- Marie Krarup Soelberg (born 1965), Danish politician
- Ole Ingebrigtsen Soelberg (1798–1874), Norwegian politician
