= Nils Kulstad =

Nils Kulstad may refer to:

- Nils M. Kulstad, Norwegian farmer, savings bank director and politician
- Nils Isachsen Kulstad, Norwegian politician.
