= 1797 in Norway =

- Centuries: 17th; 18th; 19th; 20th
- Decades: 1770s; 1780s; 1790s; 1800s; 1810s
- See also: 1797 in Denmark; List of years in Norway

Events in the year 1797 in Norway.

== Incumbents ==
- Monarch: Christian VII.

== Events ==
- The historical local Lagtings and the office of Lawspeaker was abolished.
- The Tamperret (a special marriage court in Norway) is abolished.
- 11 August - Overhoffretten, the highest court in Norway, was abolished, and replaced with four regional courts.

== Births ==
- 13 May - Ulrik Frederik Cappelen, jurist and politician (d.1864)
- 21 May - Claus Winter Hjelm, judge (d.1871)
- 24 May - Lars Rasch, jurist and politician (b.1864)
- 23 September - Johannes Henrik Berg, politician (d.1886)
- 30 November - Otto Vincent Lange, politician and Minister (d.1870)

=== Full date unknown ===
- Erik Røring Møinichen, politician and Minister (d.1875)
- Christen Smed, blacksmith and mountaineer (d.1846)
- Christen Andersen Vallesværd, politician (d.1842)
- Ole Høiland, burglar and jail-breaker (d.1848)

== Deaths ==
- 13 June - Christian Jensen Lofthuus, revolutionary peasant leader (b.1750)

=== Full date unknown ===
- Hans Strøm, zoologist (b.1726)
