= 1869 in Norway =

- Centuries: 17th; 18th; 19th; 20th; 21st
- Decades: 1840s; 1850s; 1860s; 1870s; 1880s
- See also: 1869 in Sweden; List of years in Norway

Events in the year 1869 in Norway.

== Incumbents ==
- Monarch: Charles IV.
- First Minister: Frederik Stang

== Events ==
- 14 August – Charles Wilhelm Thesen leaves Norway in his 117-ton schooner Albatros, loaded with timber to sell in New Zealand.
- 16 November – Charles Wilhelm Thesen arrives in Cape Town. After bad weather delays his onward journey, he decides to stay in South Africa.

== Arts and literature ==
- 3 April – Edvard Grieg's Piano Concerto in A minor receives its première in Copenhagen, played by Edmund Neupert, with Holger Simon Paulli conducting.

== Births ==
=== January to June ===
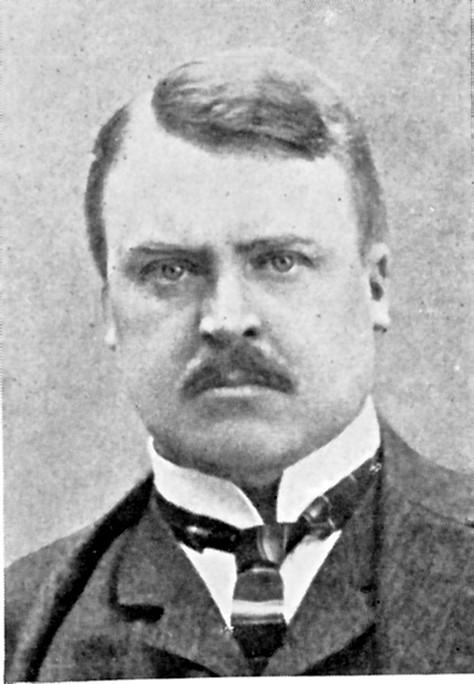
Johan Hjort

- 18 February – Johan Hjort, fisheries scientist, marine zoologist and oceanographer (died 1948)
- 23 March – Waldemar Ager, newspaperman and author in America (died 1941)
- 1 April – Peter Egge, writer (died 1959)
- 11 April – Gustav Vigeland, sculptor (died 1943)
- 5 May – Hjalmar Christensen, writer (died 1925)
- 8 May – Andreas Tostrup Urbye, politician and Minister (died 1955)
- 15 June – Anna Gjøstein, politician and proponent for women's rights pioneer (died 1956).

=== July to December ===
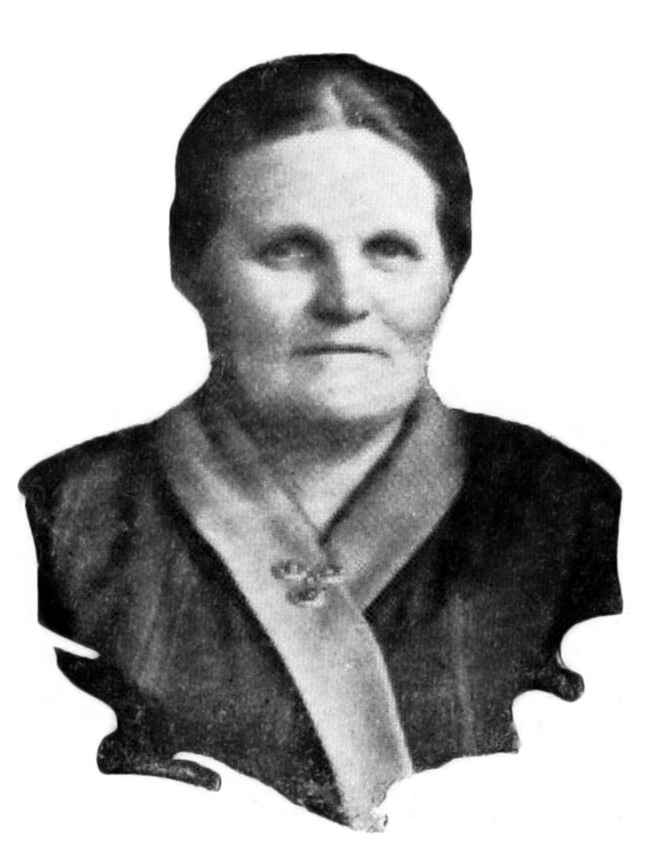
Gitta Jønsson

- 5 July – Holger Sinding-Larsen, architect (died 1938)
- 31 July – Johannes Irgens, diplomat, politician and Minister (died 1939)
- 23 August – Rasmus Olai Mortensen, politician and Minister (died 1934)
- 13 September – Kristen Holbø, painter and illustrator (died 1953)
- 17 September – Christian Lous Lange, historian, teacher and political scientist, shared the Nobel Peace Prize in 1921 (died 1938)
- 29 September – Harald Sohlberg, painter (died 1935)
- 5 October – Gitta Jønsson, politician and proponent for women's rights (died 1950).
- 11 October – Johan Aschehoug Kiær, paleontologist and geologist (died 1931)

== Deaths ==
- 6 March – Niels Nielsen Vogt, priest and politician (born 1798)
- 28 October – Gustav Peter Blom, politician (born 1785)

=== Full date unknown ===
- Melchior Schjelderup Olsson Fuhr, politician (born 1790)
- Jon Eriksson Helland II, Hardanger fiddle maker (born 1849)
- Bernt Sverdrup Maschmann, priest and politician (born 1805)
- Christopher Simonsen Fougner, politician (born 1795)
