= 1870 in Norway =

- Centuries: 17th; 18th; 19th; 20th; 21st
- Decades: 1850s; 1860s; 1870s; 1880s; 1890s
- See also: 1870 in Sweden; List of years in Norway

Events in the year 1870 in Norway.

== Incumbents ==
- Monarch: Charles IV.
- First Minister: Frederik Stang

== Events ==
- Augustus Halvorsen Hilton, migrated from Norway to San Antonio, New Mexico, establishing the American branch of the Hilton family.
- Britannia Hotel in Trondheim was established.
- The 1870 Norwegian parliamentary election.

== Births ==
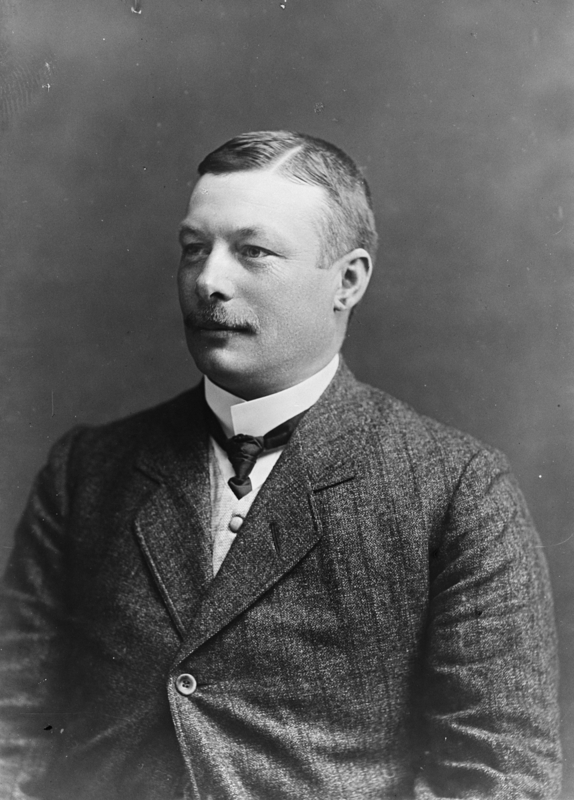
Einar Borch

- 23 January – Ole Sæther, Olympic rifle shooter (died 1946)
- 17 April – Haaken Hasberg Gran, botanist (died 1955)
- 19 May – Nils Nilsen Ronning, Norwegian-American author and editor (died 1962)
- 4 July – Barbra Ring, writer (died 1955).
- 11 September – Nils Kjær, writer (died 1924).
- 14 September – Einar Borch, landowner and politician (died 1952).
- 22 October – Johan Ludwig Mowinckel, three-times Prime Minister of Norway (died 1943)
- 26 November – Elise Sem, barrister (died 1950)
- 29 November – Eivind Heiberg, engineer and railway director (died 1939)
- 7 December – Worm Hirsch Darre-Jenssen, engineer and politician (died 1945)

=== Full date unknown ===
- Theodor Bull, businessperson and genealogist (died 1958)
- Helmer Hanssen, polar explorer (died 1956)
- Severin Andreas Heyerdahl, physician (died 1940)
- Ivar Lykke Falch Lind, jurist and politician
- Christian Pierre Mathiesen, politician and Minister (died 1953)
- Birger Stuevold-Hansen, politician and Minister (died 1933)
- Jens Thiis, art historian, conservator and museum director (died 1942)

== Deaths ==
- 9 January – Ole Gabriel Gabrielsen Ueland, politician (born 1799)
- 30 July – Aasmund Olavsson Vinje, poet, journalist and writer (born 1818).
- 4 November – Otto Vincent Lange, politician and Minister (born 1797)
- 5 December – Herman Severin Løvenskiold, composer (born 1815)
