= 1795 in Norway =

- Centuries: 16th; 17th; 18th; 19th; 20th
- Decades: 1770s; 1780s; 1790s; 1800s; 1810s
- See also: 1795 in Denmark; List of years in Norway

Events in the year 1795 in Norway.

== Incumbents ==
- Monarch: Christian VII.

== Events ==
- 28 January - The town of Farsund is founded.

== Arts and literature ==
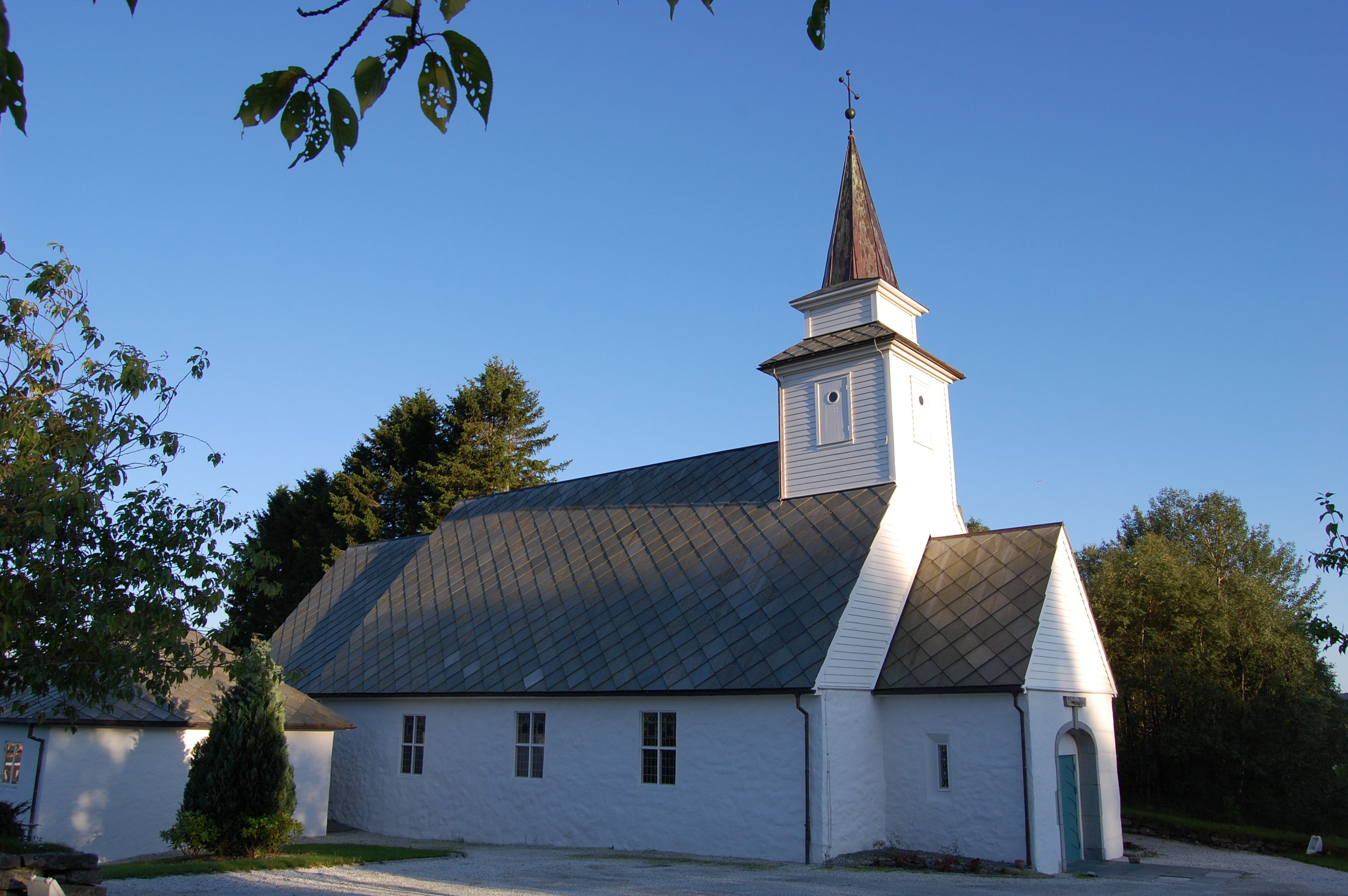
Old Åsane Church

- Old Åsane Church was built.

== Births ==
- 23 March - Bernt Michael Holmboe, mathematician (d.1850)
- 7 November - Hans Riddervold, bishop and politician (d.1876)
- 2 December - Hans Nicolai Lange, priest and politician (d.1848)

=== Full date unknown ===
- Nicolai Benjamin Cappelen, jurist and politician (d.1866)
- Mensen Ernst, road runner and ultramarathoner (d.1843)
- Christopher Simonsen Fougner, politician (d.1869)
- Hans Andersen Kiær, businessperson and politician (d.1867)
