= Henry Larsen =

Henry Larsen may refer to:

- Henry Larsen (explorer) (1899–1964), Canadian Arctic explorer
  - CCGS Henry Larsen, Canadian Coast Guard icebreaker
- Henry Larsen (Norwegian rower) (1891–?), Norwegian rower at the 1912 and 1920 Summer Olympics
- Henry Larsen (Danish rower) (1916–2002), Danish rower at the 1948 Summer Olympics
- Henry Kristian Larsen (1914–1986), Danish field hockey player
- Henry Louis Larsen (1890–1962), United States Marine Corps General and Governor of Guam

== See also ==
- Harry Larsen (1915–1974), Danish rower at the 1936 Summer Olympics
- Henry Larssen (1871–?), Norwegian judge
