= 1868 in Norway =

- Centuries: 17th; 18th; 19th; 20th; 21st
- Decades: 1840s; 1850s; 1860s; 1870s; 1880s
- See also: 1868 in Sweden; List of years in Norway

Events in the year 1868 in Norway.

== Incumbents ==
- Monarch: Charles IV.
- First Minister: Frederik Stang

== Events ==
- 21 January – Norwegian Trekking Association is founded.
- 12 October- The final stretch of the railway line Randsfjordbanen between Drammen and Hønefoss makes Norway's fifth railway complete.

== Arts and literature ==
- The local newspaper Bergens Tidende was established.

== Births ==
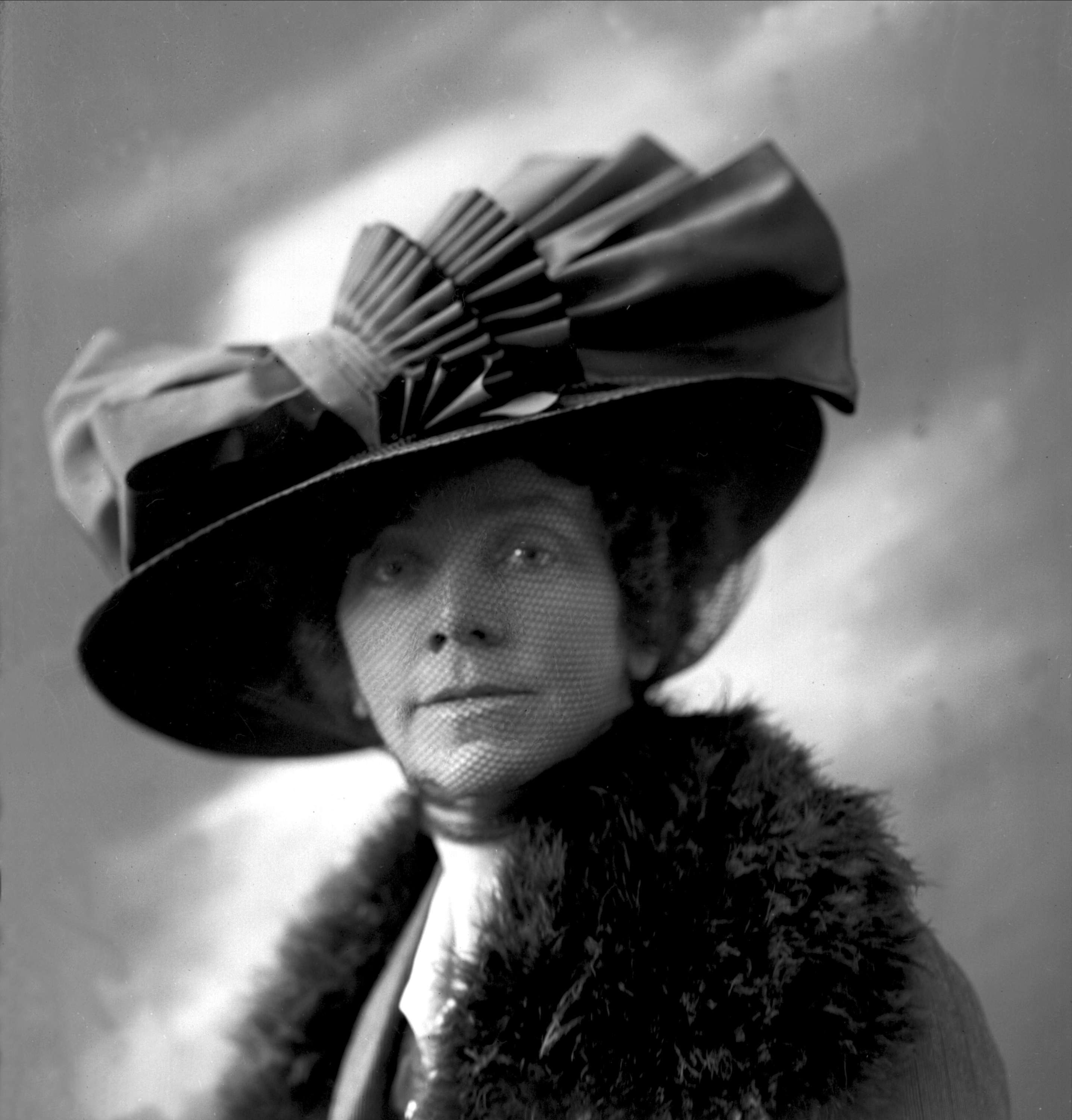
Kitty Wentzel

- 7 February – Johan Throne Holst, industrialist and politician (died 1946)
- February – Adolf Østbye, revue artist, made the first Norwegian gramophone record (died 1907)
- 24 March – Sigvald Hasund, researcher of agriculture, politician and Minister (died 1959)
- 29 April – Nils Yngvar Ustvedt, medical doctor and politician (died 1938)
- 28 July – Thomas Krag, writer (died 1913).
- 9 August – Kitty Wentzel, writer and journalist (died 1961).
- 15 August – Andreas Nilsen Rygg, Norwegian-American newspaper editor and author (died 1951)
- 24 August – Egil Eide, actor and director (died 1946)
- 25 September – Kristian Birch-Reichenwald Aars, academic (died 1917)

=== Full date unknown ===
- Adam Egede-Nissen, politician (died 1952)
- Katti Anker Møller, feminist, children's rights advocate and pioneer of reproductive rights (died 1945)
- Peter Andreas Amundsen Morell, politician and Minister (died 1948)
- Rudolf Elias Peersen, politician and Minister (died 1949)
- Torjus Værland, politician and Minister (died 1954)

== Deaths ==
- 23 May – Hans Holmboe, educator and politician (born 1798)
- 11 August – Halfdan Kjerulf, composer (born 1815)

=== Full date unknown ===
- Erik Jonsson Helland, Hardanger fiddle maker (born 1816)
- Johan Henrik Rye, jurist and politician (born 1787)
