= 1873 in Norway =

- Centuries: 17th; 18th; 19th; 20th; 21st
- Decades: 1850s; 1860s; 1870s; 1880s; 1890s
- See also: 1873 in Sweden; List of years in Norway

Events in the year 1873 in Norway.

== Incumbents ==
- Monarch: Oscar II .
- Prime Minister: Frederik Stang

== Events ==
- The office of Governor-general of Norway is abolished.
- 21 July - The post of Prime Minister for Norway was instituted, and Frederik Stang was the first appointed.

== Births ==
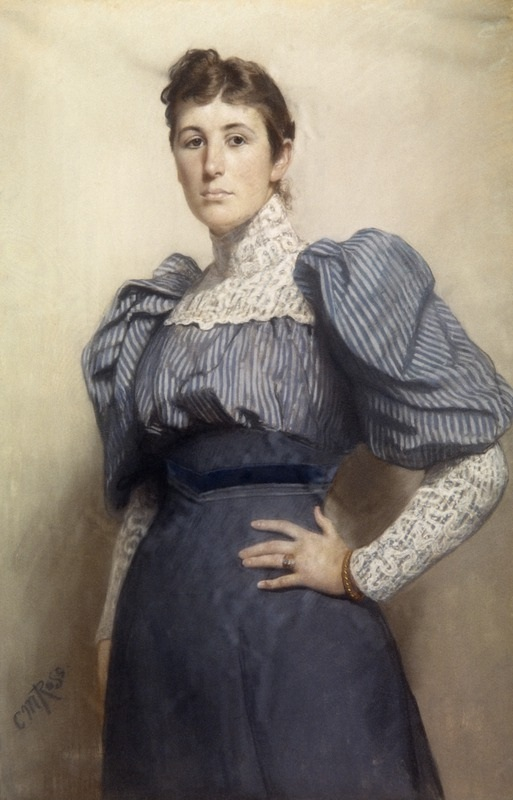
Nini Roll Anker

- 5 March – Olav Bjaaland, ski champion and polar explorer (died 1961)
- 9 March – Yngvar Sonnichsen, Norwegian-American artist and painter (died 1938)
- 11 March – Arnold Holmboe, politician and Minister (died 1956)
- 3 May – Nini Roll Anker, novelist and playwright (died 1942).
- 23 May – Ragnhild Kåta, first deafblind person in Norway to receive proper schooling (died 1947)
- 26 May – Olaf Gulbransson, artist, painter and designer (died 1958)
- 7 July – Halvdan Koht, historian, biographer, politician and Minister (died 1965)
- 28 July – Martinus Lørdahl, businessperson, multi sports competitor and sports administrator (died 1933).
- 11 September – Hanna Resvoll-Holmsen, botanist (died 1943)
- 10 October – Johan Martin Jakobsen Strand, farmer and politician (died 1935)
- 16 October – Einar Liberg, rifle shooter and Olympic gold medallist (died 1955)
- 12 December – Halfdan Christensen, actor and theatre director (died 1950).

=== Full date unknown ===
- Axel Aubert, businessperson (died 1943)
- Paal Olav Berg, politician and Minister (died 1968)
- Gerdt Henrik Meyer Bruun, politician and Minister (died 1945)
- Rasmus Olsen Langeland, politician and Minister (died 1954)
- Haagen Krog Steffens, historian, archivist and genealogist (died 1917)

== Deaths ==
- 11 April – Christopher Hansteen, astronomer and physicist (born 1784)
- 5 June – Peder Carl Lasson, jurist and politician (born 1798)
- 16 October – Frederik Due, politician (born 1796)
- 21 October – Johan Sebastian Welhaven, poet and critic (born 1807)

=== Full date unknown ===
- Christian Ludvig Diriks, politician and Minister (born 1802)
- Ole Larsen Hammerstad, politician (born 1817)
