= 1794 in Norway =

- Centuries: 16th; 17th; 18th; 19th; 20th
- Decades: 1770s; 1780s; 1790s; 1800s; 1810s
- See also: 1794 in Denmark; List of years in Norway

Events in the year 1794 in Norway.

== Incumbents ==
- Monarch: Christian VII.

== Events ==
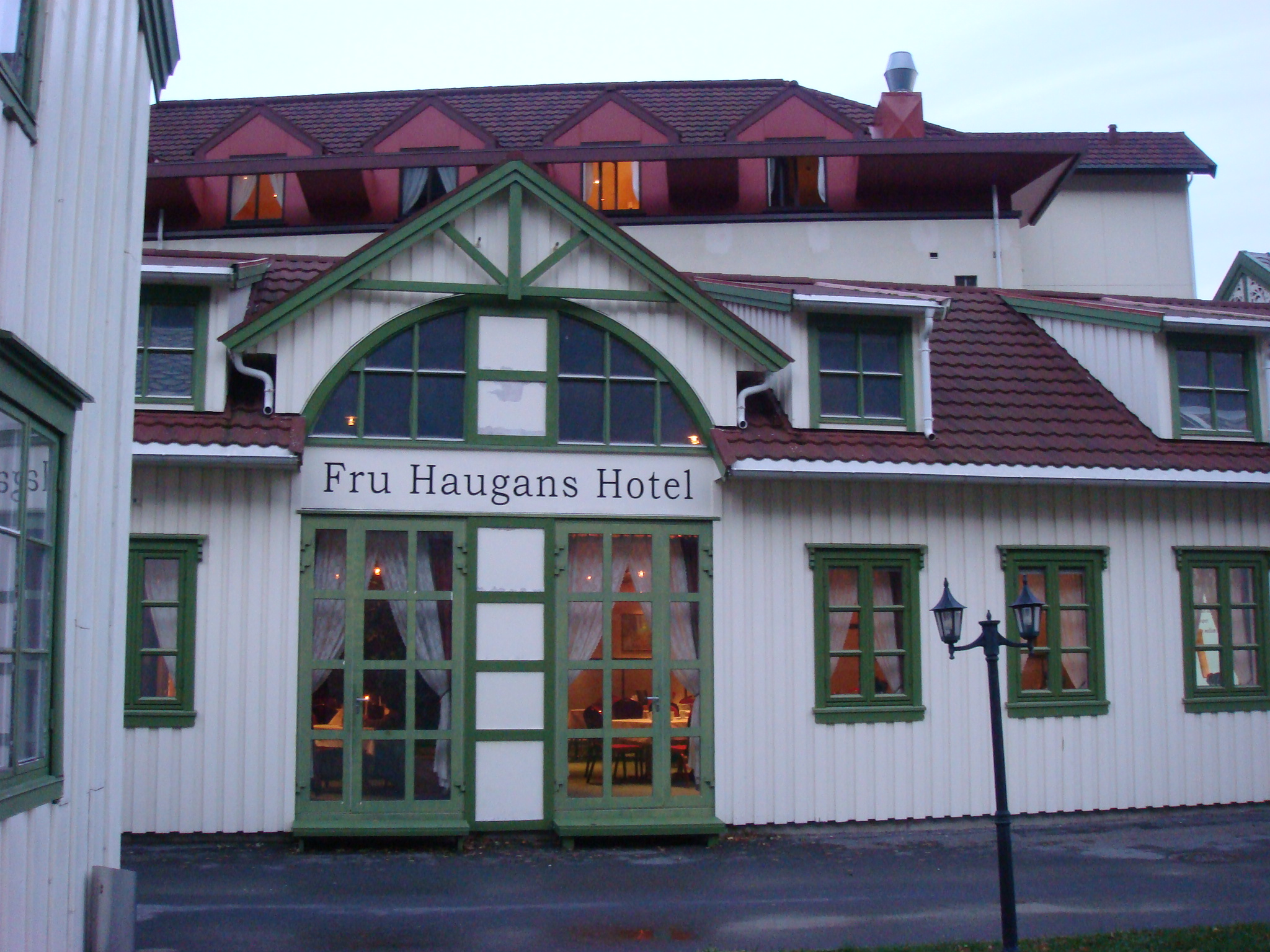
Fru Haugans Hotel

- Tromsø was issued its city charter.
- Fru Haugans Hotel in Mosjøen is founded (Northern Norway's oldest hotel in continuous operation).

== Arts and literature ==
- Det Dramatiske Selskab in Bergen is founded.

== Births ==
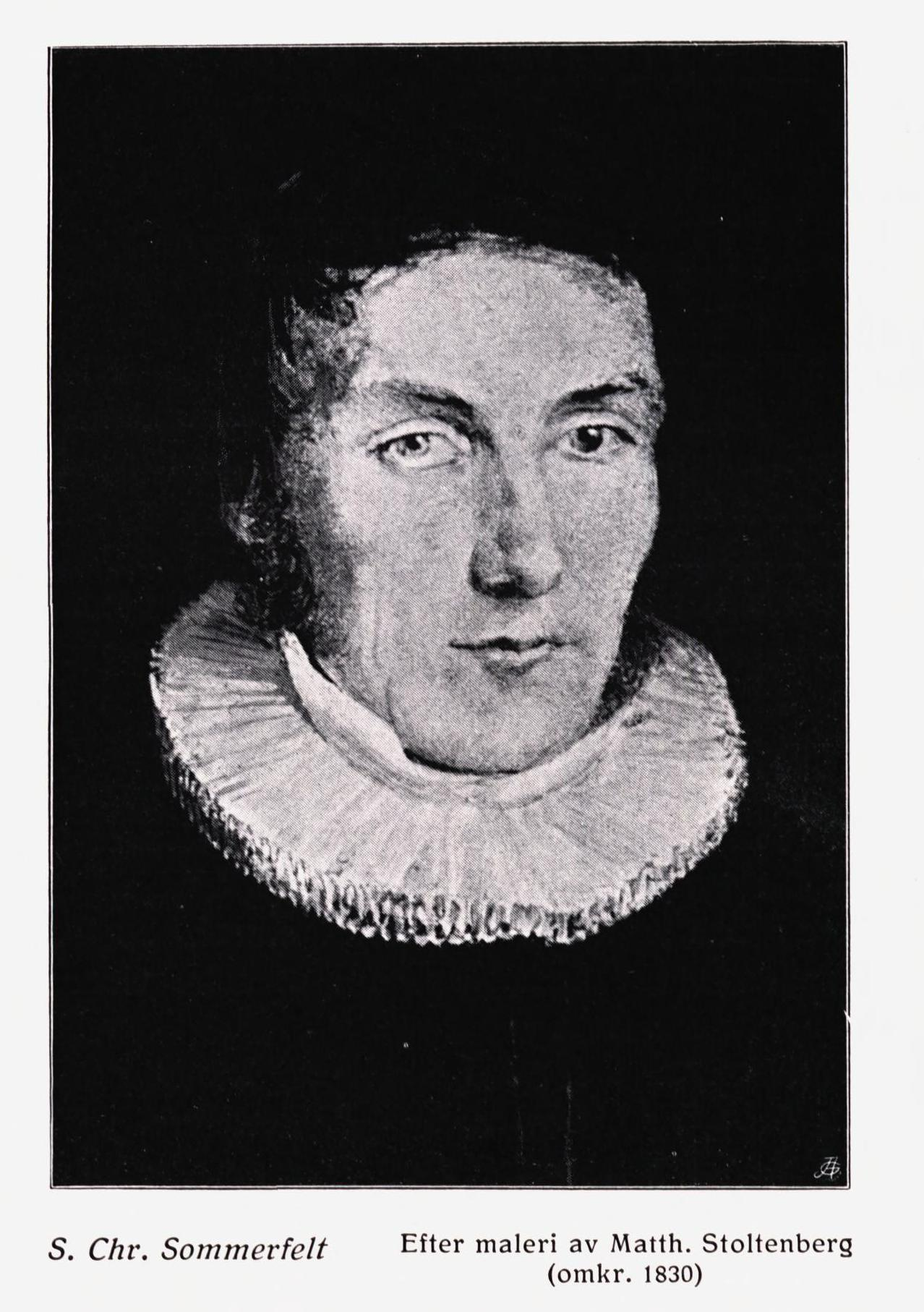
Søren Christian Sommerfelt

- 9 April – Søren Christian Sommerfelt, priest and botanist (d. 1838).
- 5 July - Maurits Hansen, writer (d.1842)
- 22 July - Peter Hersleb Harboe Castberg, priest and politician (d.1858)

=== Full date unknown ===
- Johan Peder Basberg, politician
- Jo Gjende, outdoorsman and freethinker (d.1884)

== Deaths ==
- 4 February - Salve Johannessøn Kallevig, merchant (b.1732)
- 29 September - Edvard Storm, poet (b.1749)
