= 1793 in Norway =

- Centuries: 16th; 17th; 18th; 19th; 20th
- Decades: 1770s; 1780s; 1790s; 1800s; 1810s
- See also: 1793 in Denmark; List of years in Norway

Events in the year 1793 in Norway.

== Incumbents ==
- Monarch: Christian VII.

== Events ==
- The first Sula Lighthouse was built.

== Arts and literature ==
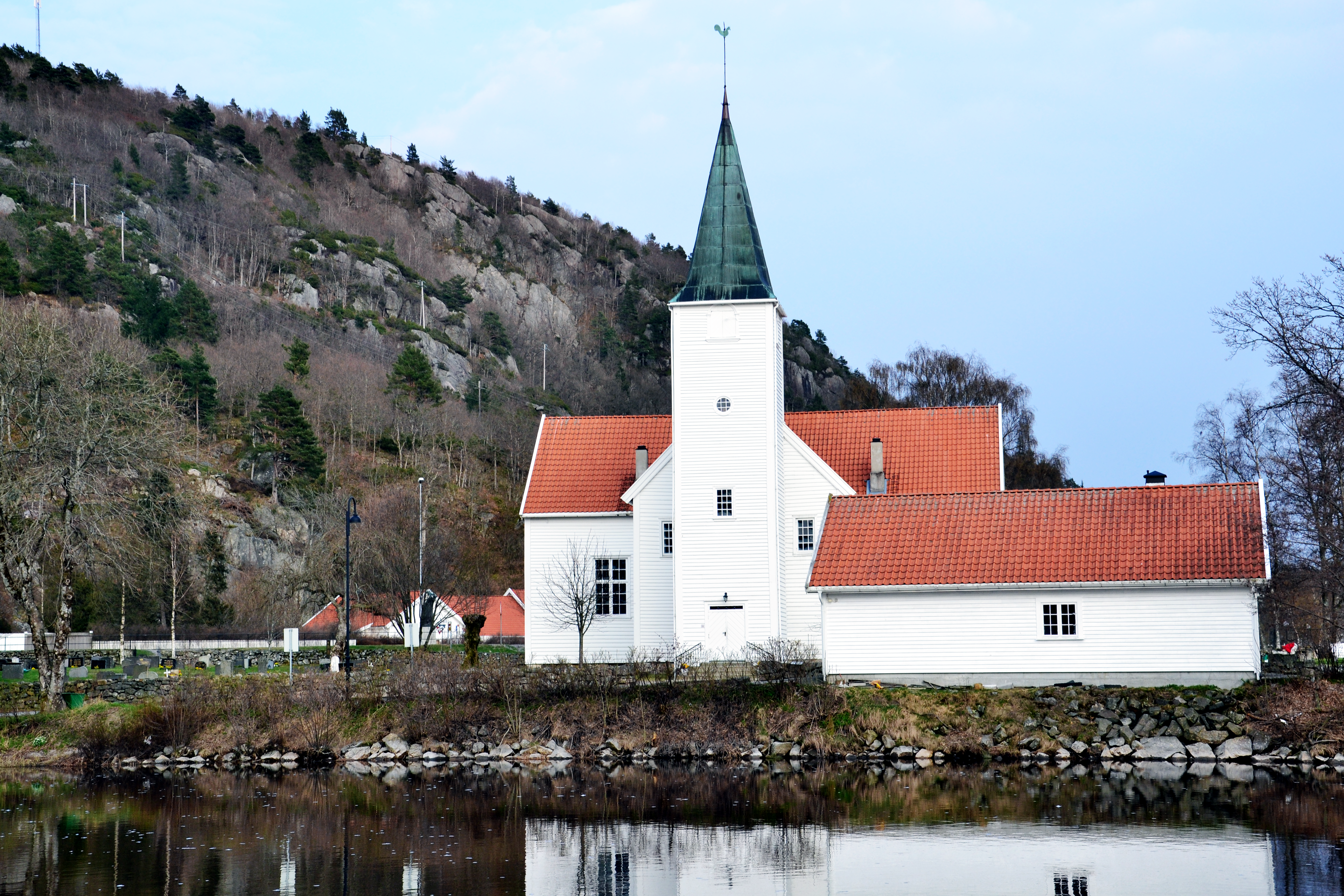
Valle Church

- Valle Church was built.

== Births ==
- 2 May - David Vogt, politician (d.1861)

=== Full date unknown ===
- Jens Lauritz Arup, politician (d.1874)
- Ole Wilhelm Erichsen, politician and Minister (d.1860)
- Ahlert Hysing, politician
- Niels Andreas Thrap, politician (d.1856)
