= 1796 in Norway =

- Centuries: 16th; 17th; 18th; 19th; 20th
- Decades: 1770s; 1780s; 1790s; 1800s; 1810s
- See also: 1796 in Denmark; List of years in Norway

Events in the year 1796 in Norway.

== Incumbents ==
- Monarch: Christian VII.

== Events ==
- 14 April - Hans Nielsen Hauge received his "spiritual baptism" in a field near his farm at Rolvsøy.

== Arts and literature ==
- Det Dramatiske Selskab in Arendal is founded.
- Gamlebyen Church was built.

== Births ==
- 19 March - Christopher Andreas Holmboe, philologist (d.1882)
- 14 April - Frederik Due, politician (d.1873)
- 10 October - Thomas Konow, naval officer and politician (d.1881)
