= 1802 in Norway =

- Centuries: 17th; 18th; 19th; 20th; 21st
- Decades: 1780s; 1790s; 1800s; 1810s; 1820s
- See also: 1802 in Denmark; List of years in Norway

Events in the year 1802 in Norway.

== Incumbents ==
- Monarch: Christian VII.

== Events ==
- 9 July - The Lærdal Rebellion ends.
- Lærdalske lette infanterikompani was formed.
- Kongsberg received city rights.

== Arts and literature ==
- Det Dramatiske Selskab in Trondheim was founded.
- The dictionary Norsk Ordsamling (Norwegian Vocabulary). by Laurents Hallager, is published for the first time. Today, this is considered the first Norwegian dialect dictionary.

== Births ==
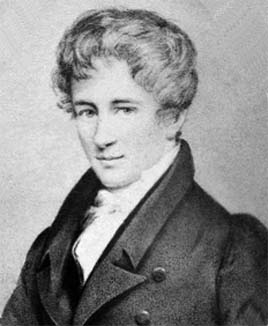
Niels Henrik Abel

- 28 July – Hans Conrad Thoresen, priest and politician (d.1858)
- 5 August – Niels Henrik Abel, mathematician (d.1829).
- 7 October – Magnus Brostrup Landstad, minister, psalmist and poet (d.1880)
- 10 October – Leonhard Christian Borchgrevink Holmboe, priest and politician (d.1887)
- 10 November – Karelius August Arntzen, politician (d.1876)
- 27 December – Thomas Fearnley, painter (died 1842).

=== Full date unknown ===
- Søren Jørgensen Aandahl, politician (d.1886)
- Christian Ludvig Diriks, politician and Minister (d.1873)
- Johan Widing Heiberg Landmark, jurist and politician (d.1878)

== Deaths ==
- 1 January - Peder Harboe Hertzberg, potato priest (b.1728)
- 13 February - Jakob Edvard Colbjørnsen, chief justice (b.1744)
