= 1790 in Norway =

- Centuries: 16th; 17th; 18th; 19th; 20th
- Decades: 1770s; 1780s; 1790s; 1800s; 1810s
- See also: 1790 in Denmark; List of years in Norway

Events in the year 1790 in Norway.

== Incumbents ==
- Monarch: Christian VII.

== Events ==
- March – Norwegian merchants meet Gustaf Mauritz Armfelt, as representative of King Gustav III of Sweden, to discuss military hjelp from Sweden to end the Danish-Norwegian union, at Eda, Sweden.

== Arts and literature ==
- The song «Udsikter fra Ulriken» is written by Johan Nordahl Brun.
- Klæbu Church was built,

== Births ==
- 1 November - Dominicus Nagell Lemvig Brun, military officer and politician (d.1874)
- 26 December - Andreas Martin Seip, military officer and politician (d.1850)

=== Full date unknown ===
- Melchior Schjelderup Olsson Fuhr, politician (d.1869)
- Jon Eriksson Helland, Hardanger fiddle maker (d.1862)
- Even Hansen, civil servant and politician (d.1840)

== Deaths ==
- 4 November - Ove Gjerløw Meyer, jurist and government official (born c. 1742)
