= 1801 in Norway =

- Centuries: 17th; 18th; 19th; 20th; 21st
- Decades: 1780s; 1790s; 1800s; 1810s; 1820s
- See also: 1801 in Denmark; List of years in Norway

Events in the year 1801 in Norway.

== Incumbents ==
- Monarch: Christian VII.

== Events ==
- 1 February – The first complete and reliable census was held in Norway: 883,603 inhabitants in Norway.
- 2 April – War of the Second Coalition – First Battle of Copenhagen: The British Royal Navy, under Admiral Sir Hyde Parker, forces the Royal Dano-Norwegian Navy to accept an armistice. Vice-Admiral Horatio Nelson leads the main attack, deliberately disregarding his commander's signal to withdraw. He is created a Viscount on 19 May; Denmark-Norway is forced to withdraw from the Second League of Armed Neutrality.

== Arts and literature ==
- Det Dramatiske Selskab in Drammen was founded.

== Births ==
- 4 February – Lauritz Dorenfeldt Jenssen, businessperson (d.1859)

=== Full date unknown ===
- Hother Erich Werner Bøttger, politician (d.1857)
- Olea Crøger, folk music collector (d.1855)
- Jan Henrik Nitter Hansen, businessman and politician (d.1879)
- Johan Frederik Thorne, businessperson and politician (d.1854)

== Deaths ==
- 23 May - Jacob Nicolai Wilse, priest and meteorologist (born 1736)
- 21 July - Mathia Collett, merchant and businessperson (born 1737)
