= 1803 in Norway =

- Centuries: 17th; 18th; 19th; 20th; 21st
- Decades: 1780s; 1790s; 1800s; 1810s; 1820s
- See also: 1803 in Denmark; List of years in Norway

Events in the year 1803 in Norway.

== Incumbents ==
- Monarch: Christian VII.

== Events ==
- 1 January – Denmark–Norway abolishes transatlantic slave trade.
- June – Anders Olson Lysne is executed for lèse-majesté. He is the last person executed for lèse-majesté in Norway.

== Arts and literature ==
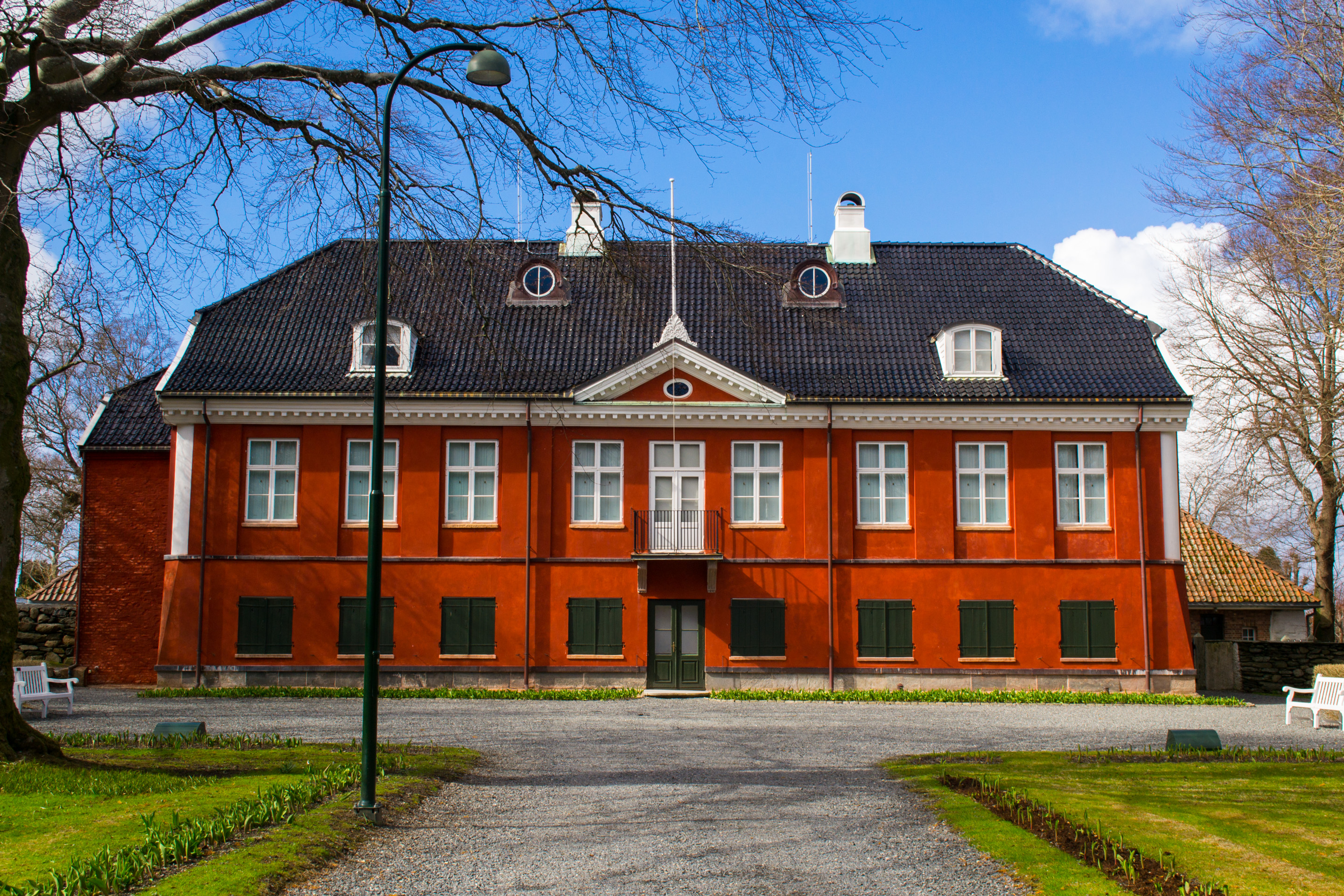
Ledaal

- The construction of Ledaal is finished.
- Sokndal Church was built.

== Births ==
- 27 September – Hans Jørgen Darre, clergyman (died 1874)

=== Full date unknown ===
- 1 September – Georg Pettersen, politician (died 1879)
- Per Ivarson Undi, early homesteader in Wisconsin Territory (died 1860)

== Deaths ==
- 15 March – Johann Friedrich von und zu Mansbach, military officer (born 1744)
- 14 April – Johan Christian Schønheyder, bishop (born 1742)
- 22 May – Frederik Otto Scheel, military officer and civil servant (born 1748).
- June – Anders Olson Lysne, leader of a farmer rebellion (born 1764)
- 15 October – Ole Irgens, bishop (born 1724)
- 18 November – Ditlevine Feddersen, culture personality (born 1727)
- 24 November – Reier Gjellebøl, priest and writer (born 1737).
