= Christen Andersen Vallesværd =

Norwegian politician

Christen Andersen Vallesværd (1797–1842) was a Norwegian politician.

He was elected to the Norwegian Parliament in 1833, representing the constituency of Nedenes og Robygdelagets Amt. He worked as a farmer there. He served only one term.
