= Peder Rasmus Lyng =

Norwegian politician

Peder Rasmus Lyng (23 November 1799 – 26 February 1863) was a Norwegian politician.

He was elected to the Norwegian Parliament in 1842, representing the rural constituency of Nordre Trondhjems Amt (today named Nord-Trøndelag). He worked as a farmer. He served only one term.
