= Ivar Lykke Falch Lind =

Norwegian jurist and politician

Ivar Lykke Falch Lind (27 February 1870 – 2 July 1951) was a Norwegian jurist and politician for the Conservative Party.

He was elected to the Parliament of Norway in 1903, and served one term. From 1920 to 1912 he served as a deputy representative. Lind was mayor of Kinn Municipality from 1923 to 1928, and from 1926 to 1928 he was temporary County Governor of Sogn og Fjordane after the County Governor Ingolf Elster Christensen was appointed to the cabinet Lykke.

Outside politics he was a bailiff in Kinn Municipality and Vevring Municipality from 1893, and police chief in Fjordane from 1921 to 1940.
