= Christian Bjelland I =

Norwegian businessman

Christian Bjelland (30 May 1858 – 9 May 1927) was the founder of Chr. Bjelland & Co A/S, Norway's largest canned goods producer and amongst the largest in Scandinavia. He became one of the great industrialists of his time and in 1908 was made a Knight, 1st Class of the Royal Norwegian Order of St. Olav for his contribution to building the Norwegian canning industry.

== Background ==
Christian Bjelland was born on the farm Åreskjold at Høyland Municipality in Rogaland, Norway. His parents were farmers who raised a family of six. In 1868, the family moved to Stavanger where Bjelland attended school in the neighborhood of Bjergsted. His formal education ended after fifth grade.

== Chr. Bjelland & Co A/S ==
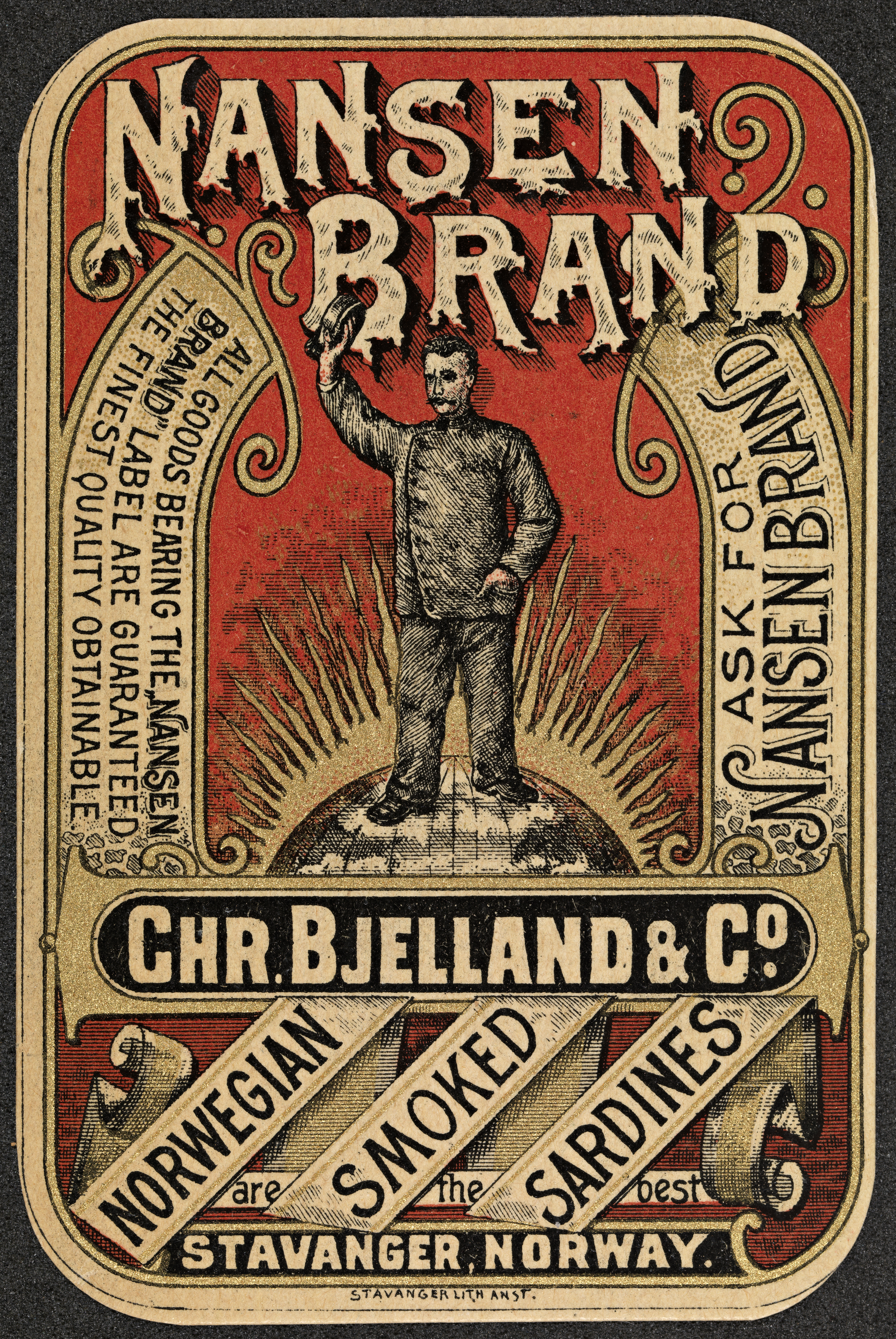
Nansen Brand. 1896. Nasjonalbiblioteket

After several years as a trading officer and inspector in various manufacturing shops, he became engaged in foreign trade, especially consignment shipments of fish to England. During 1882, Bjelland founded an export business. The initial focus of the business was established in fresh salmon, trout and halibut. In 1889 Chr. Bjelland started processing anchovies in a tin can. In 1893 he picked up the production of sardines packed with a hermetic seal.

The company became most famous for its sardines on tins featuring the images of notable Norwegians including explorer, Fridtjof Nansen. Particularly successful was the King Oscar brand for which Christian Bjelland received royal permission to use the image of Oscar II of Sweden. The King Oscar brand became well known worldwide and is still popular in the U.S.A. as well as Australia.

Bjelland sardines have been an important part of Norwegian culture throughout the 19th and 20th century. The company slogans and advertising are still remembered by many Norwegians to this day. These include the company logo known as "The Man with the Fish" painted by Theodor Kittelsen, and the slogan Ikke noe snikk-snakk, Bjellands hermetikk, takk, which translates into "No chit-chat, Bjellands canned goods, thanks".

The company was led by Christian Bjelland's son Ragnvald Bjelland (1886–1955), then by his sons Christian Wilhelm Bjelland (1913–1984) and Frithjof Ragnvald Bjelland (1914–1992). The company remained involved in the canning industry until 1983 when Christian Bjelland's great-grandson Christian Bjelland (born 1954) sold this section of the company to Norway Foods Ltd. (now Rieber & Søn).
