= 1792 in Norway =

- Centuries: 16th; 17th; 18th; 19th; 20th
- Decades: 1770s; 1780s; 1790s; 1800s; 1810s
- See also: 1792 in Denmark; List of years in Norway

Events in the year 1792 in Norway.

== Incumbents ==
- Monarch: Christian VII.

== Events ==
- Denmark-Norway declares transatlantic slave trade will be illegal after 1803 (though slavery continues to 1848 in Denmark)
- The trading and shipping company Salve Kallevig & Søn was founded in Arendal.

== Arts and literature ==
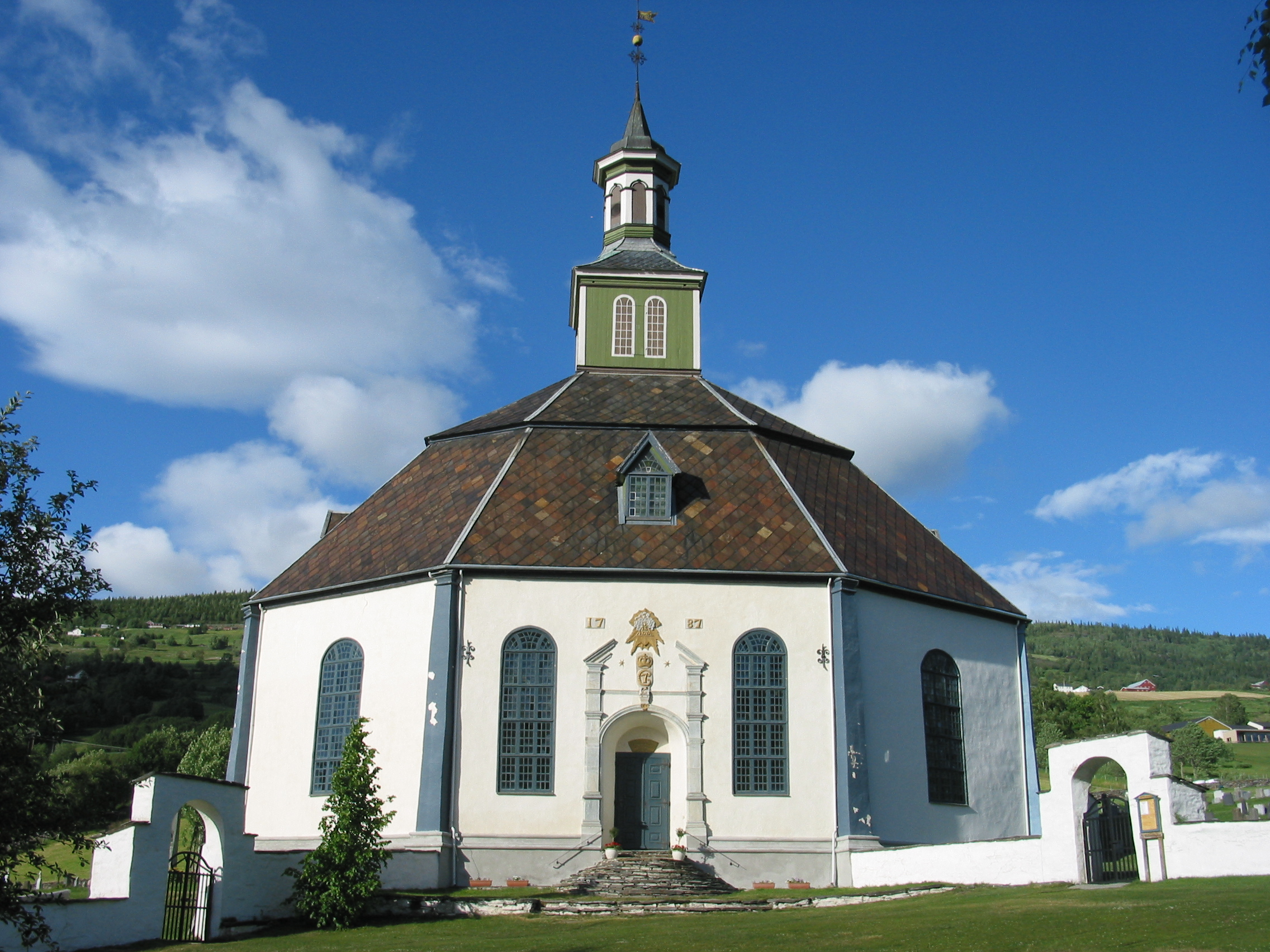
Sør-Fron Church

- Sør-Fron Church was built.
- Sandar Church was built.

== Births ==
- 1 January – Henrik Anker Bjerregaard, poet, dramatist and judge (died 1842)
- 18 November – Even Hammer Holmboe, politician (died 1859)
- 13 December – Christian Schou, brewer and merchant (died 1874).

=== Full date unknown ===
- Diderik Bøgvad, politician (died 1857)
- Jørgen Flood, merchant and politician (died 1867)
- Nils Christensen Ringnæs, politician
- Erike Kirstine Kolstad, the first professional native stage actress in Norway (d.1830)

== Deaths ==
- 14 December - Ole Nilsen Weierholt, wood carver (born 1718)
