= Sofie Johannesdotter =

Executed Swedish-Norwegian serial killer

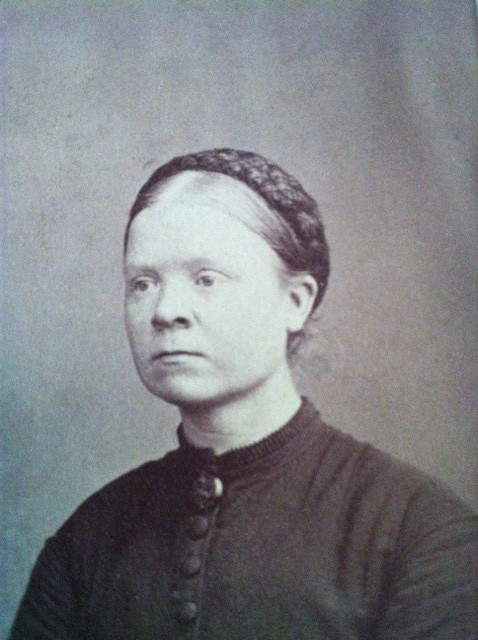
- 1875 photograph of Johannesdotter
- Born: 24 August 1839; Ärtemark, Sweden
- Died: 18 February 1876 (aged 36); Fredrikshald, Norway
- Cause of death: Execution by beheading
- Conviction: Murder x3
- Penalty: Death

Details
- Victims: 3+
- Span of crimes: 1869–1874
- Country: Norway
- State: Østfold
- Date apprehended: 24 March 1875

Sofie Johannesdotter (24 August 1839 – 18 February 1876) was a Swedish-Norwegian serial killer who poisoned at least three people in Fredrikshald (present-day Halden) from 1869 to 1874. Johannesdotter would later be convicted of these killings and executed, the last woman to be executed in Norway and the penultimate execution overall.

== Early life ==
Sofie Johannesdotter was born on 24 August 1839 in the small village of Ärtemark in Sweden. She came from a family of poor, uneducated peasants who had five other children, two of which died in infancy. Growing up in the impoverished countryside, Johannesdotter was illiterate and was reportedly abused by her parents. At the age of 15, she was sent to school to learn reading and writing, with which she struggled.

In 1867, she emigrated to Norway in search of employment, settling in Fredrikshald and working at a cotton mill for some time. The following year, she found herself a job as the maid of 70-year-old Niels Anker Stang, a local merchant.

== Crimes ==
Shortly after her arrival, the other servants began complaining of Johannesdotter's quarrelsome and antagonistic attitude, as a result of which several of them left. Unbeknownst to her employer, she would also frequently steal when she was left unsupervised.

On 16 October 1869, one of the Stangs' maids, Maren Johannesdatter, died suddenly. While her cause of death was initially believed to be from cholera, it would later become known that she had been poisoned with arsenic trioxide, which Johannesdotter had been given as a gift from her sister and had secretly put in Johannesdatter's cup of tea. The reason for the murder was never revealed, but it is suspected that Sofie killed her after the two got into an argument, and thought she would get rid of her as Maren had just resigned in order to get married.

On 12 October 1872, Stang's wife, 63-year-old Catharina Elisabeth Foyn Wiel, fell ill with a mysterious illness, from which she succumbed four days later. Johannesdotter had poisoned her with arsenic as well, as Wiel had repeatedly attempted to have her fired, only for her husband to intervene. According to some of the other maids, Sofie had told them in private that someone should kill Mrs. Stang.

On 10 October 1874, Stang finally discovered that Johannesdotter had been stealing from him, and ordered that she be fired. In response, he was then poisoned with arsenic put in his barley soup and died the same evening.

On 17 January 1875, Johannesdotter attempted to poison 16-year-old Mathilde Wiel, a relative of the deceased Mrs. Stang, with arsenic, but the girl managed to survive. According to her confessions, Johannesdotter had been put in charge of nursing the girl back to health after she had caught the flu, but had grown tired and wanted to get rid of her. While she survived, Wiel was left with permanent damage from the poisoning. She later married a Swedish-American Methodist priest, and wrote several Christian songs until her death in 1903, the most well-known of which is "Si allting til Jesus".

On 10 February 1875, Johannesdotter gathered her belongings and set the Stang household on fire. While the house was burned to the ground, nobody was injured.

== Arrest and investigation ==
Ever since the mysterious fire, rumours had spread around the Fredrikshald area that Sofie Johannesdotter was responsible for it. Based on these rumours, on 23 March 1875, the bodies of Mr. and Mrs. Stang were exhumed and brought to Ebenezer Hospital for an autopsy, which revealed that both showed copious amounts of arsenic. While nothing at this time pointed towards Sofie, she was made the prime suspect when authorities discovered letters to her sister in Sweden, in which she asked for arsenic to treat a reported skin condition. As a result, Johannesdotter was located and brought to the hospital the next day, and when she was shown the bodies, she confessed to killing both spouses.

Several days after her arrest, she also confessed to killing Maren Johannesdatter and poisoning Mathilde Wiel, as well as numerous arsons and stealing numerous small items from her employer. Authorities also investigated her for the deaths of a gardener and her own father, as well as the attempted poisoning of an elderly woman, but Johannesdotter vehemently denied any involvement and her guilt was never proven in these cases.

== Trial, imprisonment and execution ==
On 19 July 1875, Sofie Johannesdotter was found guilty of trifold murder and sentenced to death. In November of that year, her sentence was both upheld by the Supreme Court and approved by King Oscar II, a staunch opponent of capital punishment. While in prison, Johannesdotter was frequently visited by a priest, and became devoutly religious.

On 18 February 1876, Sofie Johannesdotter was beheaded at the Borgermesterløkken in Fredrikshald by executioner Theodor Larsen. Right before her execution, she read aloud the Swedish hymn "Källan", and as she was about to be beheaded, she held the hand of her priest and reportedly said that "Now, [she] will go home to Jesus!".

== See also ==
- List of serial killers by country

== Bibliography ==
- Per Hohle (1 January 1980). De endte på skafottet: Om mord og udåd, drapsmenn og dommer i gammel tid [They ended up on the scaffold: about murder and outrage, murderers and executioners in ancient times] (in Norwegian). Grøndahl. ISBN 8250404025.
- Frank Kiel Jacobsen (2008). Giftmordersken i Fredrikshald : historien om Sophie Johannesdatter [The poisoner of Fredrikshald: the story of Sofie Johannesdotter] (in Norwegian). H. Anderson Books.
