= Einar Hanssen =

Norwegian judge

- Born: 24 August 1874; Nesodden, Norway
- Occupation: Judge

Einar Hanssen (24 August 1874 – 1952) was a Norwegian judge.

He was born in Nesodden to Carl Julius Hanssen and Marie Elisabeth Giverholt. He graduated as cand.jur. in 1898, and was named as a Supreme Court Justice from 1922 to 1946. He was decorated as Commander of the Swedish Order of the Polar Star, and Commander of the Danish Order of the Dannebrog.
