= Anna Sethne =

Norwegian educator and trade unionist

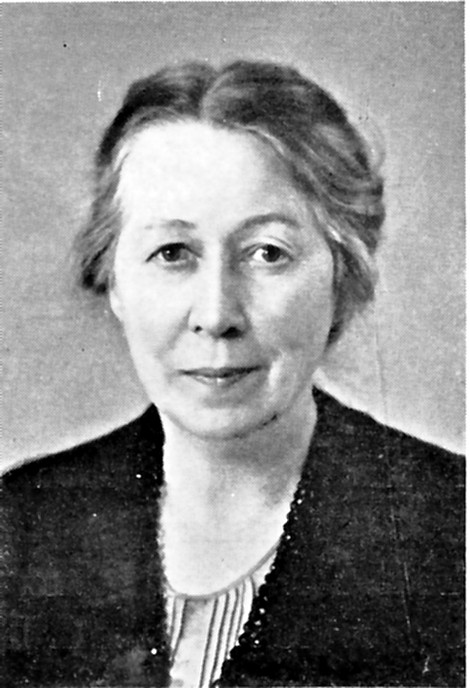
- Born: 25 September 1872; Drammen, Norway
- Died: 26 April 1961 (aged 88); Oslo
- Occupations: Educator; Trade unionist
- Awards: Order of St. Olav (1932); Medal of St. Hallvard (1956)

Anna Cathrine Sethne (25 September 1872 – 26 April 1961) was a Norwegian educator and trade unionist. Working as a schoolteacher and eventually headmaster, she co-founded and chaired a trade union for female teachers and edited the union's magazine. She contributed to the development of public education in Norway, both by her books and by participation in governmental committees.

== Early years ==
She was born in Drammen to Thomas Johannesen and Maren Helene Ødeskog, and was married to teacher and inspector Johan Sethne.

== Career ==
After graduating as a teacher in 1891, Sethne worked as a teacher in Drammen for six years, and from 1897 in Kristiania. She served as headmaster at Sagene skole in Oslo from 1919 to 1938. She edited the magazine Vår skole from 1911 to 1941 and was a co-founder of the trade union Norges Lærerinneforbund in 1912, which she chaired from 1919 to 1938. Her books include the six-volume series of readers for primary school, Lesebok for folkeskolen (1923–1926, in cooperation with Christian Killengreen), as well as the teachers' guidebook Hjemstedslære from 1928. She was a member of several governmental committees, including Skoleplankomiteen (1935–38) and Normalplankomiteen (1936–39).

== Honors ==
Sethne was decorated as a Knight, First Class of the Order of St. Olav in 1932, for her contributions to the development of public school in Norway. A bronze bust of Sethne, sculpted by Emil Lie, was unveiled at Sagene in 1952. She was awarded the Medal of St. Hallvard in 1956.

Sethne died in Oslo on 26 April 1961. In 1976, a street at Torshov in the borough of Sagene in Oslo was named after her.
