= Jon Skeie =

Norwegian jurist (1871–1951)

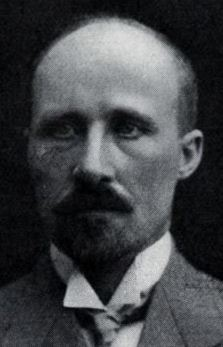
- Born: 22 July 1871; Vinje, Norway
- Died: 17 September 1951 (aged 80); Oslo, Norway
- Occupation: Jurist

Jon Skeie (22 July 1871 – 17 September 1951) was a Norwegian jurist.

He was born at Vinje Municipality in Telemark, Norway. He was the son of farmer and teacher Aslak Eivindsson Skeie and Jorunn Jonsdotter Vå. He was a cand.jur. in 1900. He was appointed professor at the University in Kristiania from 1907 to 1941. From 1909 to 1939 he served as exceptional judge at the Supreme Court of Norway, and he was a member of several legislative committees.
