= Wilhelm Faye =

Norwegian military officer

- Born: 3 January 1881; Fet, Norway
- Died: 22 December 1967 (aged 86)
- Military career
- Allegiance: Norway
- Branch: Norwegian Army
- Service years: 1901–
- Rank: Colonel
- Awards: Order of St. Olav; Order of the Sword; Order of the White Rose of Finland; Order of Orange-Nassau

Wilhelm Nicolay Faye (3 January 1881 – 22 December 1967) was a Norwegian military officer, lecturer, war historian and local politician.

== Career ==
Faye was born in Fet on 3 January 1881 to Gabriel Antonio Faye and Fernanda Augusta Landmark. He achieved his Examen artium student qualifications in 1898, and graduated as military officer from the Norwegian Military Academy in 1901, becoming a first lieutenant in the Kristiansandske Brigade in 1901. He then graduated from the Norwegian Military College in 1909. In August 1909 he married Laura Parr. He lectured at the Norwegian Military Academy from 1916, and headed the Norwegian Military Academy from 1927 to 1929. He was promoted major in 1930 and colonel in 1932. During the Second World War he was in command of the Norwegian 7th Brigade. As a local politician, he was elected member of the municipal council of Aker.

== Honours ==
Faye was decorated Knight, First Class of the Order of St. Olav in 1924, was a Commander of the Swedish Order of the Sword, a Knight of the Order of the White Rose of Finland, and Officer of the Dutch Order of Orange-Nassau. He died on 22 December 1967 at the age of 86.

== Selected works ==
- Lærebok i taktikk for befalskolene. 1932.
- Krigen i Norge 1940. Operasjonene i Østfold. 1963.
