= Ragnvald Hvoslef =

Norwegian politician

Ragnvald Hvoslef (19 September 1872 in Oslo – 8 August 1944) was a Norwegian Nazi politician and collaborator during the Second World War. He was a co-founder of the Norwegian Nazi party Nasjonal Samling in 1933. In 1940 he was named by Vidkun Quisling as Minister of Defence in Quisling's attempted and ultimately unsuccessful coup government, but declined the position. From 1941 he held several roles in Quisling's collaborator regime, including as Police President in Kirkenes 1941–1942, as head of Nasjonal Samling's effort to fight "sabotage" and as head of Quisling's personal intelligence organisation within Nasjonal Samling from 1943 until his death.

Hvoslef was a volunteer in the Winter War on the Finnish side. He was the brother of Olympic sailor Einar Hvoslef.
