= Sigurd Halvorsen Johannessen =

Norwegian politician

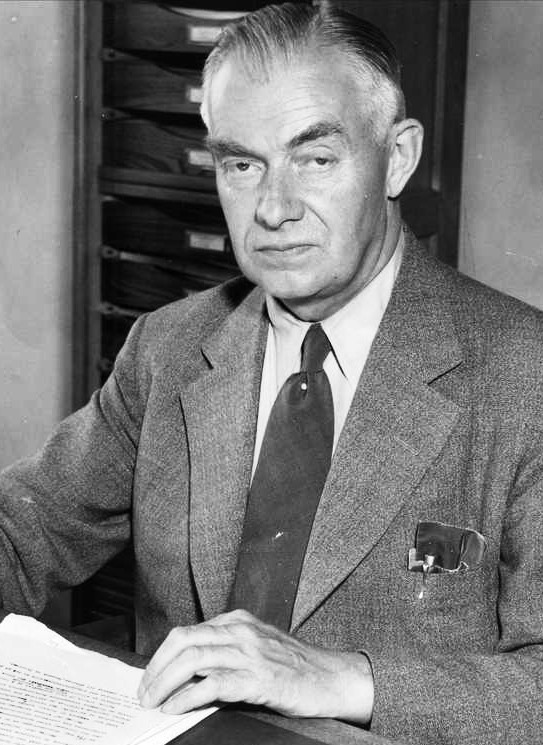
Sigurd Halvorsen Johannessen, c. 1930

Sigurd Halvorsen Johannessen (28 July 1881 – 6 May 1964) was a Norwegian acting councillor of state in the NS government of Vidkun Quisling 1940–1941, and a minister 1941–1942.
