= Ole Christensen Walstad =

Norwegian politician

Ole Christensen Walstad (11 August 1799 – 22 July 1877) was a Norwegian politician.

He was elected to the Norwegian Parliament in 1836, 1842, 1845, 1848, 1851, 1854, 1857, 1859, 1862, 1865 and 1868, representing the rural constituency of Akershus Amt (today named Akershus). He worked as a farmer.
