= Henny Astrup =

Norwegian actress (1876–1961)

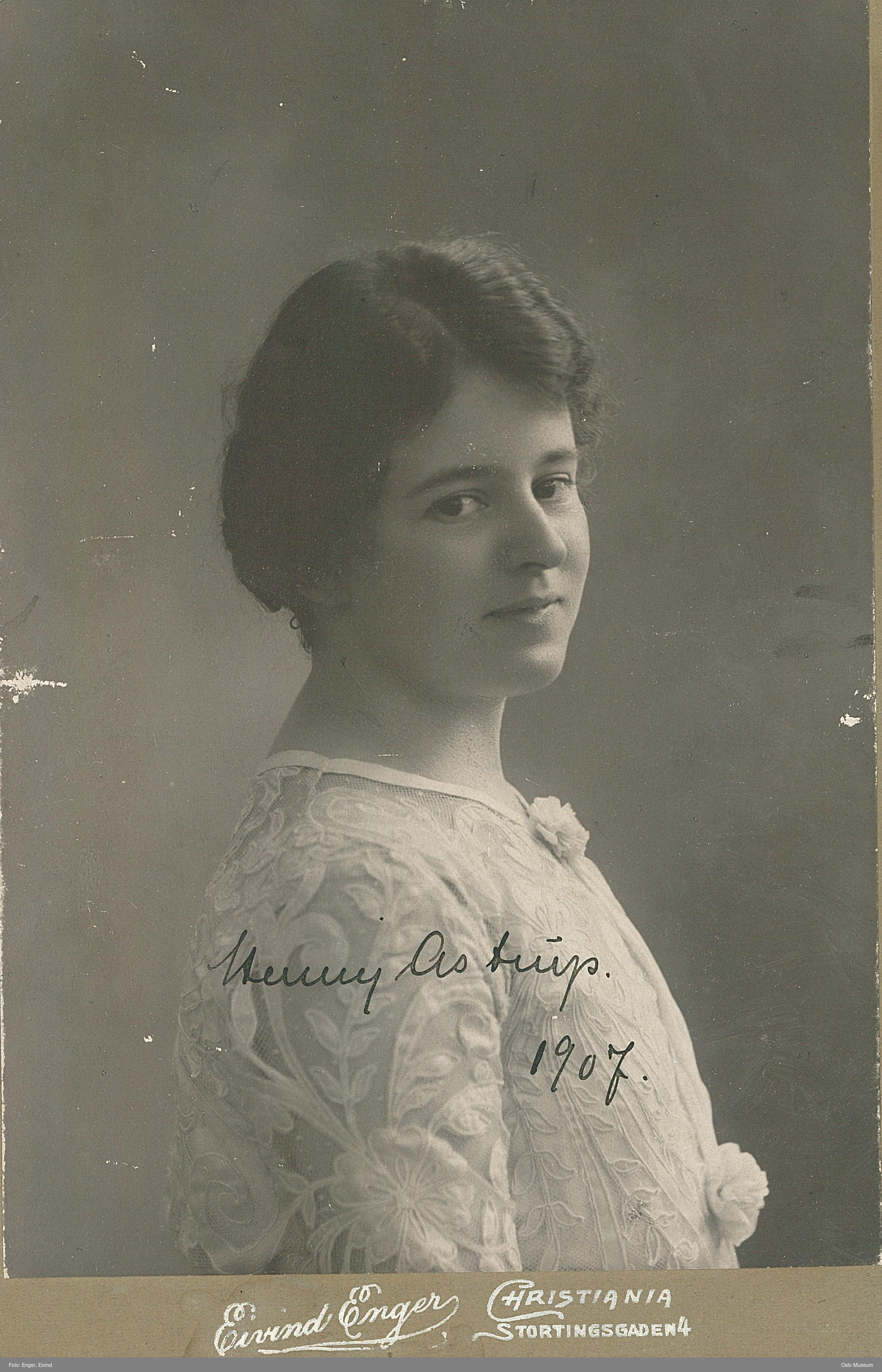
- Henny Astrup in 1907
- Born: Henninge Münster; 17 August 1876; Bergen, Norway
- Died: 3 March 1961 (aged 84); Klampenborg, Gentofte, Denmark
- Spouse: Nils Astrup (m. 1897)

Henninge "Henny" Münster Astrup (17 August 1876 – 3 March 1961) was a Norwegian actress.

== Early and personal life ==
Henny Astrup was born on 17 August 1876 in Bergen to theologian Hans Petter Bay Glatved and Nanna Münster Prahl. On 25 May 1897, she married Nils Astrup (1860–1912). Their marriage was dissolved before the turn of the century.

== Career ==
Astrup made her debut on 28 August 1904 at Den Nationale Scene in Bergen as Helga in Geografi og Kjærlighed. Her so-called second debut took place on 2 October 1904, in the role of Lydia Longuish in Medbeilerne.

On 31 October 1905, Astrup portrayed Cyprienne in Las os Skilles at the National Theatre in Oslo. Her performance was lauded, she was described as being "possessed, like Cyprienne, an astonishing certainty both in line and in the field, and was also not without a certain mischievous mood". Despite the positive reception she received, Astrup did not land any further employment at the theatre.

From Autumn 1907, Astrup joined Ludovica Levy's National Tour as an actress, secretary and business manager. During the tour, she portrayed Nora in the Henrik Ibsen play A Doll's House. After a performance of it in Fredrikshald, it was said she "was made for the role, both in appearance and in nature". When the tour's season ended in 1910, Astrup performed in Tromsø in the musical Dramatisk og deklamatorisk musikalsk Soiré alongside Levy and pianist Gyda Foss. In continuation of this, Levy and Astrup performed Erasmus Montanus and Det lykkelige Skibbrudd, sharing the role between them.

In 1911, Astrup received praise for her role in a production of Paul Gavauli's four-act farce Chocoladepigen. It was written that Astrup was "a very sweet chocolate girl, who, by virtue of her beauty, her exuberant zest for life and her millions, was a danger to her surroundings. Chocoladepigen is one of the best Henny Astrup has done".

== Later life ==
When Ludovica Levy settled in Denmark in 1922, Astrup joined her. Regarding the relationship between Levy and Astrup, actress Ranka Knudsen stated that Astrup "was like a foster daughter to Mrs. Levy whom she carefully took care of until the last moment. It was Mrs. Levy who made Henny the great actress she was".

Astrup died on 3 March 1961, at the age of 84 in Klampenborg, Denmark.
