= Harald Kolbeinson Guddal =

Norwegian politician

Harald Kolbeinson Guddal (1798–1887) was a Norwegian politician.

He was elected to the Norwegian Parliament in 1842, representing the rural constituency of Nordre Bergenhus Amt. He worked as a farmer. He served only one term.

He hailed from Oppstryn, and was the first deputy mayor of Stryn Municipality in 1843.
