= Leif Georg Ferdinand Bang =

Norwegian politician (1881–1963)

Leif Georg Ferdinand Bang (11 October 1881 - 3 September 1963) was a Norwegian politician for the Labour Party.

He served as a deputy representative to the Norwegian Parliament during the term 1922–1924, representing the Market towns of Møre og Romsdal county.

Born in Bergen, he was a typographer until 1910, when he became a police officer in Kristiansund. He was a member of Kristiansund city council from 1907 to 1928, serving as both deputy mayor and mayor for short periods. He was then burgomaster for three months in 1938. He returned as a council member in 1945.

As a police officer, he was a member of the national board of the trade union Norsk Politiforbund from 1914 to 1922. From 1922 he worked in the public assistance in his city.
