= Eyvind Andersen =

Norwegian judge (1874–1939)

- Born: 7 July 1874; Halden, Norway
- Died: 2 January 1939 (aged 64)
- Occupation: Judge

Eyvind J. Andersen (7 July 1874 – 2 January 1939) was a Norwegian judge.

He was born in Halden to Victor Christian Andersen and Theodora Caroline Jacobine Frølich. He graduated as cand.jur. in 1899, and was named as a Supreme Court Justice from 1921.

Andersen died on 2 January 1939, at the age of 64.
