= Aslak Reiersson Midhassel =

Norwegian politician

Aslak Reiersson Midhassel (July 17, 1798 – January 15, 1882) was a Norwegian politician.

He was elected to the Norwegian Parliament in 1842, representing the rural constituency of Lister og Mandals Amt (today named Vest-Agder). He served only one term.
