= Johan Arndt =

Norwegian politician

Johan Arndt (9 May 1876 – 1933) was a Norwegian politician for the Conservative Party.

He served as a deputy representative to the Norwegian Parliament during the term 1913–1915, representing the constituency of Østerrisør.

Born in Skien, he took an education as a pharmacist in 1900 and worked in Risør from 1902. He was a member of Risør city council, and was also director of the local savings bank from 1910 to 1912.

He married Thora Holta; the couple had two children and adopted a third.
