= Mikal Angell Jacobus Landmark =

Norwegian politician

Mikal Angell Jacobus Landmark (27 July 1867 - 27 June 1939) was a Norwegian politician for the Liberal Party.

He was elected to the Norwegian Parliament in 1916, representing the constituency Nordre Nordmør. He served only one term.

Born in Ålesund, he was a great-grandson of a Jens Landmark (1772–1811), brother of Andreas (1769–1839) and Nils Landmark (1775–1859) and uncle of Jens Landmark (1811–1880).

Mikal Landmark mainly worked as a local police sergeant, in Aure Municipality, following in his father's footsteps. He was a member of the municipal council of Aure Municipality for some time.
