= Barthold Hansteen Cranner =

Norwegian botanist

Barthold Hansteen Cranner (6 March 1867 – 2 February 1925) was a Norwegian botanist.

Born in Oslo, he worked as a professor at the Norwegian College of Agriculture. He especially worked with phosphoric, lipidic matter in plant cells.
