= Christian Hansen Wollnick =

Norwegian politician

Personal details
- Born: October 8, 1867
- Died: March 27, 1936 (aged 68)
- Party: Labour Party
- Occupation: Newspaper editor, jurist, politician

Christian Hansen Wollnick (8 October 1867 – 27 March 1936) was a Norwegian newspaper editor, jurist and politician for the Labour Party.

He was born in Tjølling Municipality as the son of a shipmaster. He took his secondary education in Skien in 1885 and worked one year as a school teacher in Larvik. He then embarked on several parallel careers; he enrolled in the military, studied law parallel and pursued a journalistic career. As a military officer he reached the ranks of Premier Lieutenant in 1894 and Captain in 1903. He had started early as a journalist, and edited the newspaper Ørebladet from 1891 to 1892. In 1895, he graduated with the cand.jur. degree. He spent the years 1896 and 1897 as a law clerk in Trondhjem, before moving to Kristiansund N. Here, he was a solicitor from 1899 to 1904, and also edited the local newspaper Møre Tidende. He was also a deputy member of the city council for a short period.

He then worked as a solicitor in Kristiania, before moving to Kristiansand S in 1909. Parallel to working as a solicitor there, he edited Sørlandets Socialdemokrat. In 1921, he was hired as police attorney. From 1929 to 1936, he served as town clerk. He was also director of the municipal cinema company, chaired the school board and the local Riksmål association. A member of the city council from 1919 to 1925, the last term in the executive committee, he was also elected to the Norwegian Parliament in 1919. He served one term, representing the Labour Party.
