= Axel Theodor Næss =

Norwegian judge

- Born: 19 December 1874; Mandal, Norway
- Died: 4 December 1945 (aged 70)
- Occupation: Judge

Axel Theodor Næss (19 December 1874 – 4 December 1945) was a Norwegian judge.

He was born in Mandal to printer and editor Anton August Næss and Angelica Thekla Schleusz. He graduated as cand.jur. in 1896, and was named as a Supreme Court Justice from 1927. He was a member of the supervisory council for Botsfengselet from 1920.
