= Brita Bjørgum =

Norwegian writer, teacher and women's rights activist (1858–1906)

- Born: Brita Josefdotter Bjørgum; 11 March 1858; Voss Municipality, Vestland, Norway
- Died: 16 January 1906 (aged 47); Voss Municipality, Vestland, Norway
- Occupations: Writer; Teacher; Women's rights activist
- Writing career
- Pen name: Brita

Brita Josefsdotter Bjørgum (11 March 1858 – 16 January 1906) was a Norwegian writer, teacher and women's rights activist. She was one of the first feminist writers to write in Nynorsk.

== Early life ==
Brita Bjørgum was born on 11 March 1858 in Voss Municipality to farmer and freeholder Josef Tollefson and Brita Larsdotter. She was the sister of painter Nils Bjørgum. She never married.

== Career ==
In 1879, Bjørgum took the lower teacher test at the teacher training school at Ølve in Sunnhordland. She then worked as a substitute teacher in Voss Municipality.

Bjørgum wrote poems and short fiction in publications such as the Unge Skud/Unglyden and Den 17de Mai, often just under the name Brita. In the latter magazine she published a serial, which was published as a book in 1895, titled Kari Lidi. The book is considered to be the first longer story written by a woman in Nynorsk.

Bjørgum was an active member of the Noregs Ungdomslag. She was an active feminist who was fought for women's suffrage and the right for women to smoke, and she is considered a pioneer among female Nynorsk writers. She also advocated for a republic as a form of government.

Despite her political work, Bjørgum was concerned with tradition and held a Christian outlook on life. She also interested in bunad clothing and she sought out old patterns and sewing techniques. In 1892, she was the first to contribute money to the charitable orphanage in Voss.

== Later life ==
Bjørgum died on 16 January 1906, at the age of 47.

== Bibliography ==
- 1895: Kari Lidi
