= Nils Gregoriussen Skilbred =

Norwegian politician

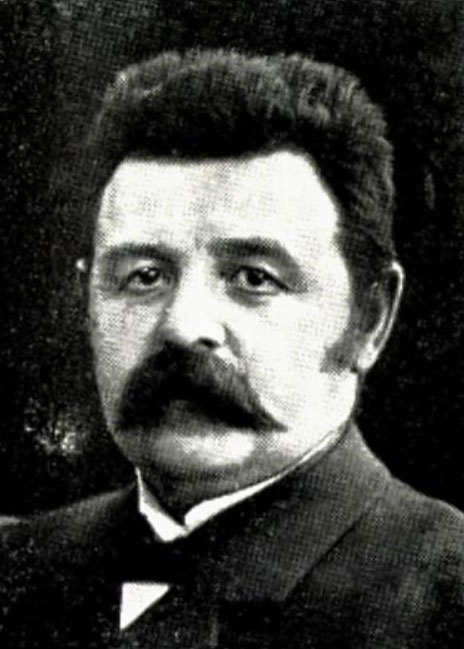
Portrait of Nils Gregoriussen Skilbred

Nils Gregoriussen Skilbred (20 August 1860 – 2 May 1943) was a Norwegian politician for the Liberal Party.

Born in Gjerpen Municipality, he worked as a farmer and carpenter. He became involved in the local workers' societies, and joined the Liberal Party. He was a member of the local party board from 1897. In 1898 he was elected to the municipal council of Gjerpen Municipality; he served in the executive committee until 1919, except for the years 1907 to 1910 when he was deputy mayor.

In 1898 he was also elected to the Norwegian Parliament for his constituency Bratsberg Amt. He was re-elected in 1900, 1904 and 1910. He then served as a deputy representative during the terms 1913–1915, 1916–1918 and 1919–1921.

Skilbred was a deputy member of the board of the Norwegian Water Resources and Energy Directorate from its foundation to 1926. He was also a board member of the local savings bank, as well as several municipal committees.
