= Marta Marie Nielsen =

Norwegian schoolteacher and politician

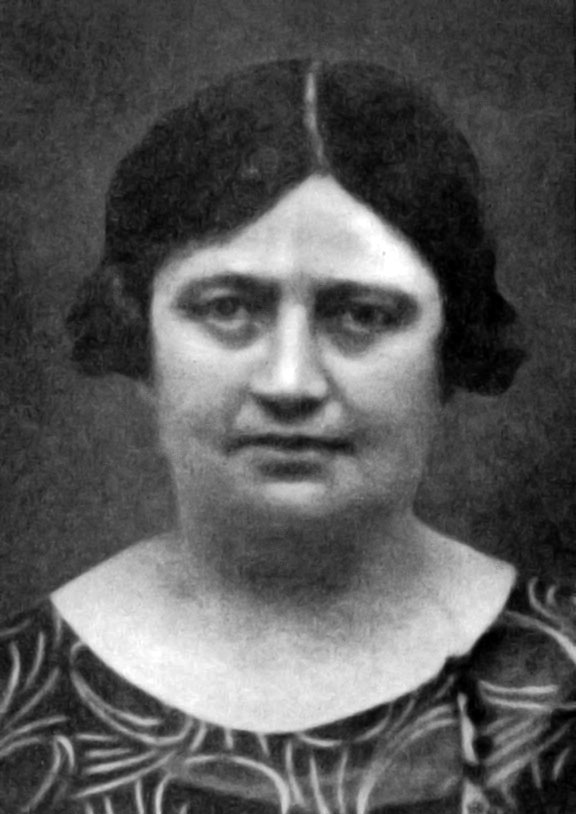
- Born: 26 March 1881; Christiania, Norway
- Died: 15 June 1948 (aged 67)
- Occupations: Schoolteacher; Politician

Marta Marie Nielsen (26 March 1881 – 15 June 1948 ) was a Norwegian schoolteacher and MP (Labour Party).

== Biography ==
Nielsen was born in Christiania to Christian Nielsen and Anne Bønsnæs. She was an educated teacher and worked as a schoolteacher.

She was a member of the Labour Party elected representative to the Storting for the period 1937–1945, for Akershus. She was the only woman in the Storting during her tenure.

As MP, she focused health issues and her campaign in favor of health stations. She was met little success at first, but after an intense campaign, she finally managed to acquire public funding for her idea in 1938. When Norway was invaded by Nazi Germany, she belonged to those MP's that followed the government to Hamar and Elverum on 9 April 1940. She belonged to those who voted down the Riksrådet-suggestion.
