= Diderik Bøgvad =

Norwegian politician (1792–1857)

Diderik Kornelius Mortensen Bøgvad (4 March 1792 – 31 December 1857) was a Norwegian politician.

He was elected to the Norwegian Parliament in 1842, representing the rural constituency of Lister og Mandals Amt. He sat through only one term.

Residing at Øye in Kvinesdal, he had been a shipmaster. He died in 1857.
