= Nils Isachsen Kulstad =

Norwegian politician

Nils Isachsen Kulstad (1798 - 1876) was a Norwegian politician.

He was elected to the Norwegian Parliament in 1839 and 1842, representing the rural constituency of Nordlands Amt (today named Nordland). He worked as a farmer and fisher.
