= Hother Erich Werner Bøttger =

Norwegian architect

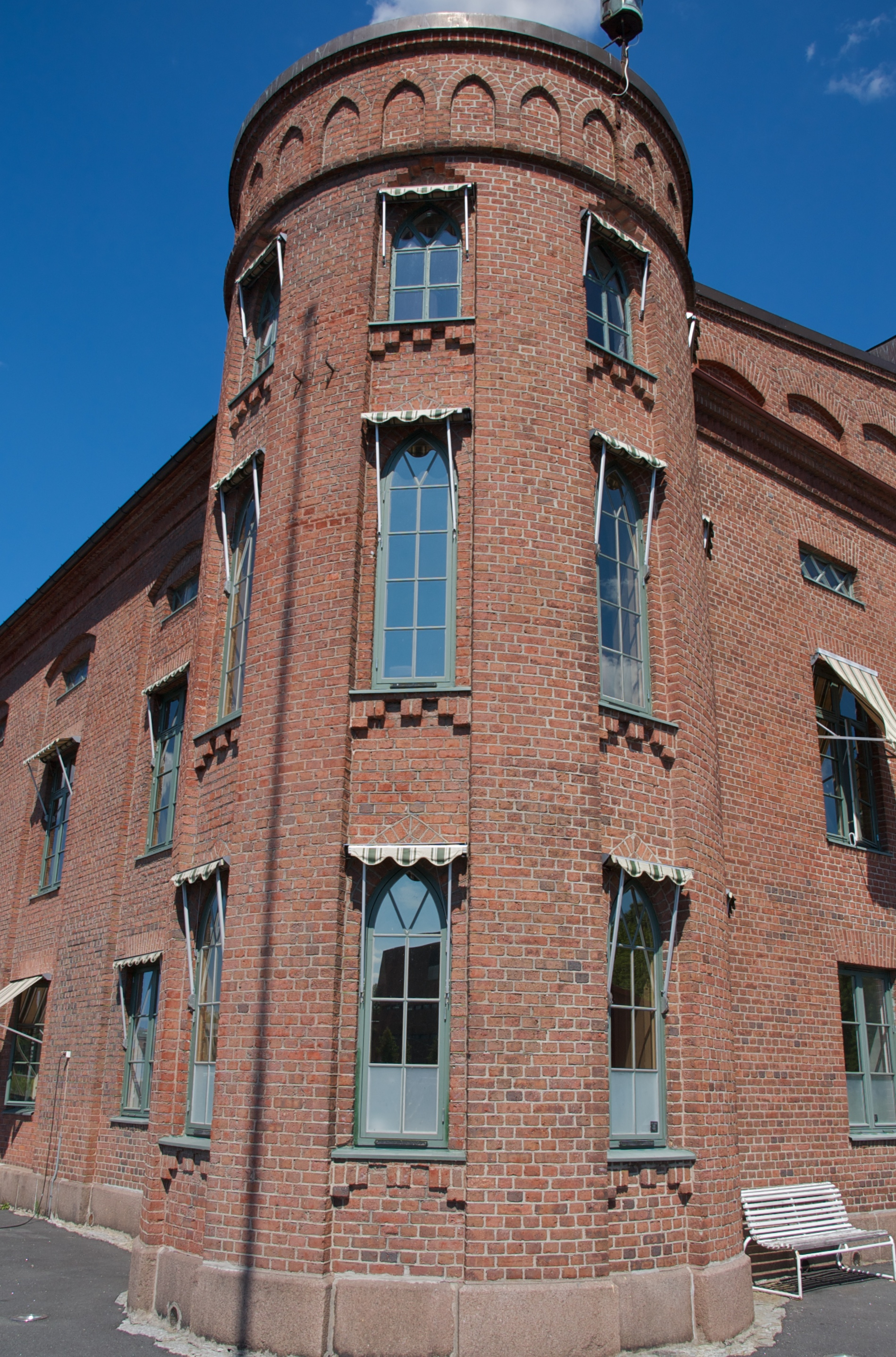
Tollboden - Skien

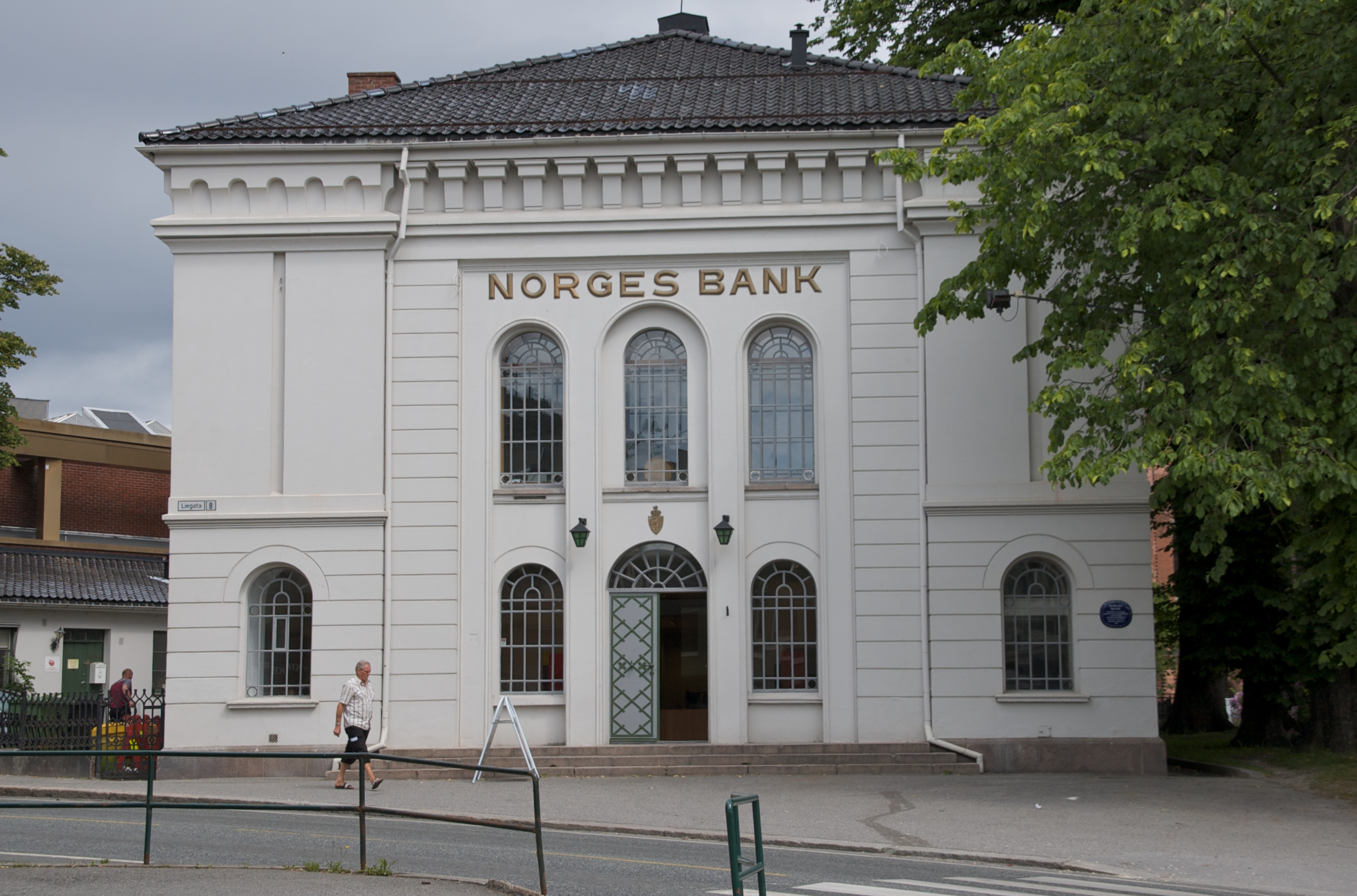
Norges Bank – Skien

Hother Erich Werner Bøttger (18 May 1801 – 28 October 1857) was a Norwegian architect.

He was born at Skien in Telemark, Norway. His father, Johannes Bøttger, had immigrated from Denmark and was the local church organist. Bottger was trained as a master carpenter and later as an architect at the Royal Danish Academy of Fine Arts in Copenhagen. He worked as a merchant in Lillehammer for a while before returning to Skien by approximately 1830. He was eventually appointed chief architect in the city.

Bottger was associated with a number of local projects, including improvements to the old Skien Church. The main building at Holden Manor (Holden hovedgård) at Ulefoss was rebuilt and expanded for Diderik von Cappelen (1795–1866), owner of Ulefos Jernværk in the 1850s. He also completed the drawings for the Norges Bank building in Skien.

He was first elected to the Skien city council in 1839. He served as mayor of Skien from 1842 to 1843. He was elected to the Norwegian Parliament in 1845 and 1857, representing the constituency of Skien. He died right after the end of his second term.
