= Henry Larssen =

Norwegian judge

- Born: 24 May 1871; Drammen, Norway
- Died: 7 January 1956 (aged 84)
- Occupation: Judge

Henry Larssen (24 May 1871 – 7 January 1956) was a Norwegian judge.

He was born in Drammen to Hans Larssen and Caroline Caspersen. He graduated as cand.jur. in 1893, and was named as a Supreme Court Justice from 1922 to 1947.
