= Christopher Simonsen Fougner =

Norwegian politician

Christopher Simonsen Fougner (1795–1869) was a Norwegian politician.

He was elected to the Parliament of Norway in 1836, 1839, 1842, 1845 and 1851, representing the rural constituency Buskeruds Amt). He was the mayor of Hole from 1840 to 1848. He owned the farm Stein at Ringerike, and worked as a farmer in Hole.
