= Ole Ingebrigtsen Soelberg =

Norwegian politician

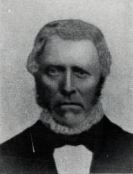

Ole Ingebrigtsen Soelberg (11 October 1798 – 2 January 1874) was a Norwegian politician.

He was elected to the Norwegian Parliament in 1833, 1836, 1842, 1845, 1851 and 1854. He represented the rural constituency of Søndre Trondhjems Amt (today the southern part of Trøndelag county), except for 1842 when he represented Nordre Trondhjems Amt (today the northern part of Trøndelag county). He worked as a farmer, and supported farmer-friendly policies.

He was born in Soknedal, but moved to Strinda in 1835. Local government was introduced in Norway in 1837, and Soelberg served as mayor of Strinda Municipality for a total of 14 years, divided between three periods between 1839 and 1862. He had moved to Gløshaugen in 1860, and lived there for the rest of his life.
