= 1825 in Norway =

- Centuries: 17th; 18th; 19th; 20th; 21st
- Decades: 1800s; 1810s; 1820s; 1830s; 1840s
- See also: 1825 in Sweden; List of years in Norway

Events in the year 1825 in Norway.

== Incumbents ==
- Monarch: Charles III John.
- First Minister: Jonas Collett

== Events ==
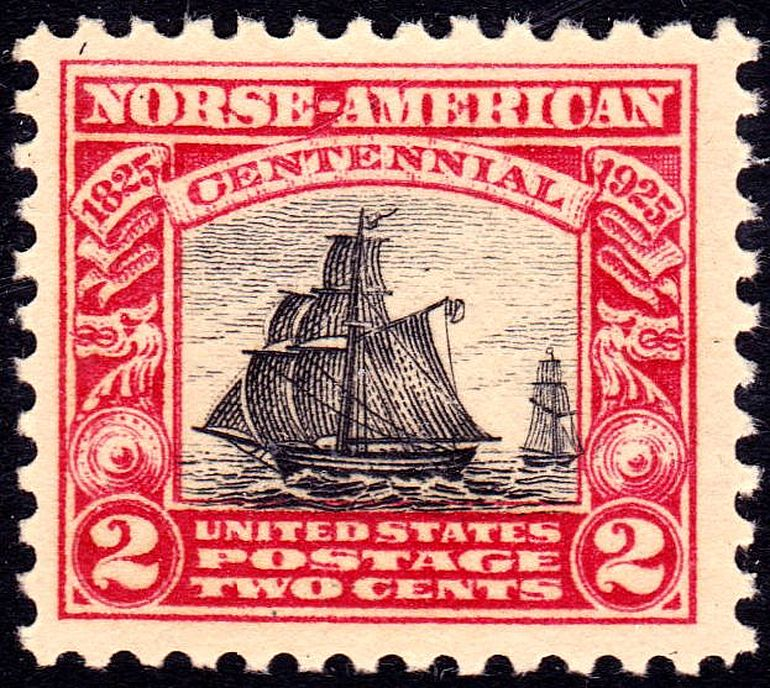
U.S. postage stamp featuring the ship Restauration issued in honor of the 100th anniversary of Norwegian immigration

- 4 July – The sloop Restauration set sail from Stavanger to New York City. It is considered the first organized emigration from Norway to the United States.
- 27 November – Population Census: Norway had 1,051,318 inhabitants.

== Arts and literature ==
- Det Dramatiske Selskab in Egersund is founded.

== Births ==
- 13 March – Hans Gude, painter (d.1903)
- 30 March – Theodor Kjerulf, geologist and poet (d.1888)
- 28 April – Lorenz Juhl Vogt, politician (d.1901)
- 1 June – Jacob Aall Ottesen, Norwegian American minister, theologian and church leader (died 1904)
- 10 June – Sondre Norheim, skier and pioneer of modern skiing (d.1897)
- 16 June – Herman Amberg Preus, Norwegian American Lutheran clergyman and church leader (died 1894)
- 9 October – Oluf Andreas Aabel, priest and writer (d.1895)
- 24 October – Carl Anton Bjerknes, mathematician and physicist (d.1903)
- 17 November – Jacob Kielland, naval officer and politician (d.1889)

=== Full date unknown ===
- Carl Johan Severin Steen, politician (d.1874)

== Deaths ==
- 2 February – Laurents Hallager, physician and lexicographer (born 1777)
- 18 March – Henriette Mathiesen, culture personality (born 1762)
- 12 August – Magdalene Sophie Buchholm, poet (born 1758)
