= 1777 in Norway =

- Centuries: 17th; 18th; 19th; 20th
- Decades: 1750s; 1760s; 1770s; 1780s; 1790s
- See also: 1777 in Denmark; List of years in Norway

Events in the year 1777 in Norway.

== Incumbents ==
- Monarch: Christian VII.

== Events ==
- Danish India is turned over to the government by the Danish Asiatic Company and becomes a Danish–Norwegian crown colony.

== Arts and literature ==
- Old Nordre Osen Church was built.

== Births ==
- 7 February - Severin Løvenskiold, nobleman and politician (died 1856)
- 18 February - Andreas Arntzen, politician (died 1837)
- 12 April - Caspar Peter Hagerup, civil servant (died 1840)
- 20 April - Hans Jørgen Reutz Synnestvedt, military officer and politician (died 1841)
- 5 June - Oluf Borch de Schouboe, politician and Minister (died 1844)
- 3 August - Peter Motzfeldt, politician and Minister (died 1854)
- 12 September - Hans Jacob Arnold Jensen, military officer and politician (died 1853)
- 12 November - Laurents Hallager, physician and lexicographer (died 1825)

=== Full date unknown ===
- Christian Krohg, politician and Minister (died 1828)
- Peder Tollefsen Ilsaas, politician
- Nicolai Niels Nielsen, priest and politician (died 1854)
- Jacob Andreas Wille, priest and politician (died 1850)

== Deaths ==
- 22 May – Nicolaus Christian Friis, priest and writer (born 1714).
