= 1826 in Norway =

- Centuries: 17th; 18th; 19th; 20th; 21st
- Decades: 1800s; 1810s; 1820s; 1830s; 1840s
- See also: 1826 in Sweden; List of years in Norway

Events in the year 1826 in Norway.

== Incumbents ==
- Monarch: Charles III John.
- First Minister: Jonas Collett

== Events ==
- May - The agreement from 1825 between Norway and Russia, making Paatsjoki (Pasvikelva) and Jakobselva border between the two countries, is ratified
- December – The paddle steamer SS Constitutionen, the first steam ship of Norway, arrives. The ship was built in England for the State of Norway.

== Births ==
- 2 May – Wincentz Thurmann Ihlen, engineer and industrialist (d. 1892)
- 12 October – Kathinka Kraft, memoirist (d. 1895).

=== Full date unknown ===
- Christen Christensen, military officer and politician (d. 1900)
- Fritz Trampe Flood, merchant (d. 1913)

== Deaths ==
=== Full date unknown ===
- Jens Erichstrup, politician (b. 1775)
