= 1781 in Norway =

- Centuries: 16th; 17th; 18th; 19th; 20th
- Decades: 1760s; 1770s; 1780s; 1790s; 1800s
- See also: 1781 in Denmark; List of years in Norway

Events in the year 1781 in Norway.

== Incumbents ==
- Monarch: Christian VII.

== Events ==
- 23 February - Hans Eilersen Hagerup was ennobled, and given the noble family name Gyldenpalm.
- 11 April - Oplandenes amt was split into two, with the western part becoming Kristians amt and the eastern part becoming Hedemarkens amt.

== Arts and literature ==
- Edvard Storm writes Zinklars vise ("Ballad of Sinclair").

== Births ==
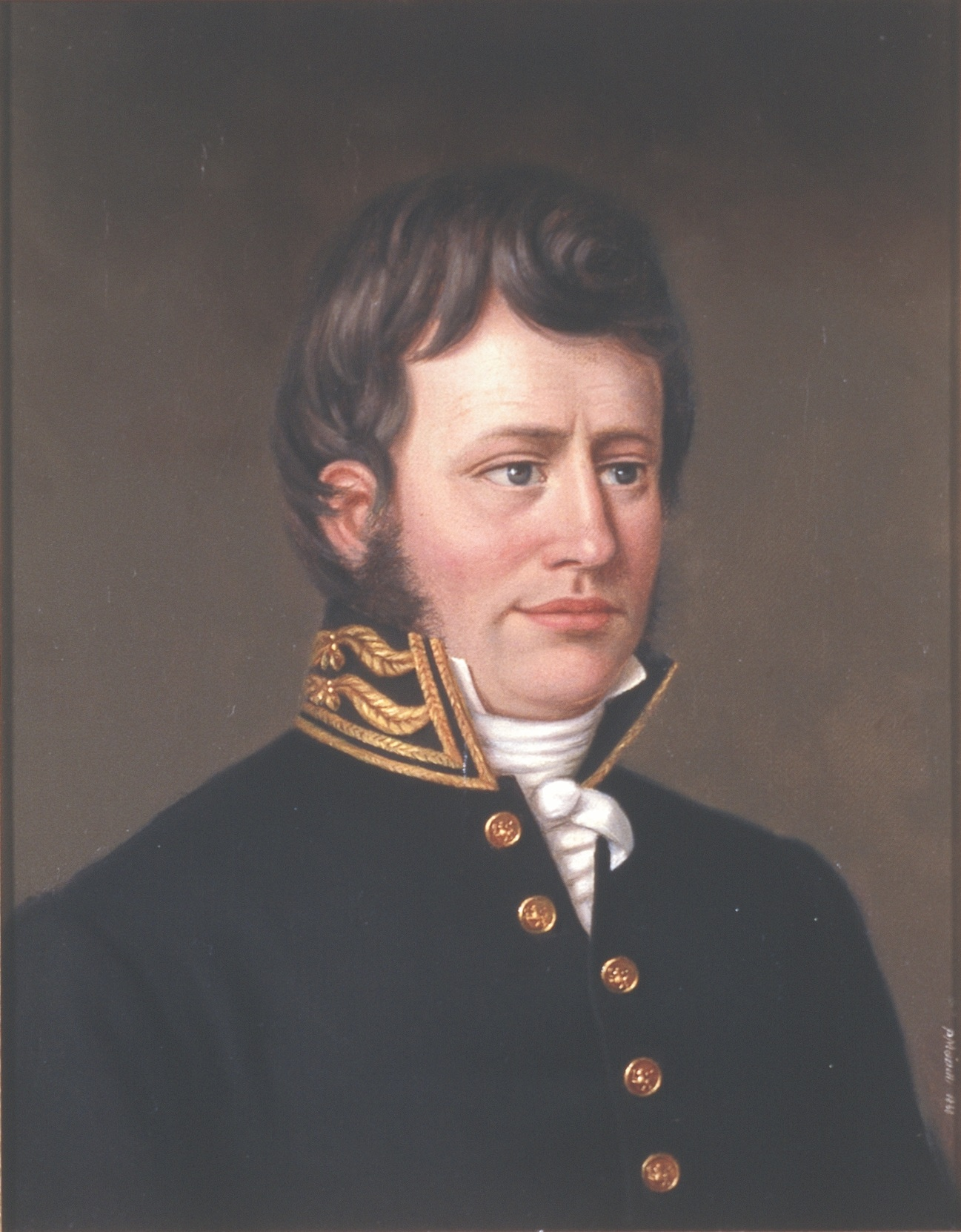
Christian Hersleb Horneman

- 19 May – Lars Andreas Oftedahl, priest and politician (died 1843)
- 1 December – Ferdinand Carl Maria Wedel-Jarlsberg, commanding general of the Norwegian Army (died 1857)
- 10 December – Christian Hersleb Horneman, jurist and politician (died 1860).

=== Full date unknown ===
- Palle Rømer Fleischer, politician and Minister (died 1851)
- Edvard Hagerup, solicitor and politician (died 1853)
- Jørgen Young, merchant and politician (died 1837)
