= 1863 in Norway =

- Centuries: 17th; 18th; 19th; 20th; 21st
- Decades: 1840s; 1850s; 1860s; 1870s; 1880s
- See also: 1863 in Sweden; List of years in Norway

Events in the year 1863 in Norway.

== Incumbents ==
- Monarch: Charles IV.
- First Minister: Frederik Stang

== Events ==
- 10 August – The murder of Knut Grøte in Christiania.

== Births ==
=== January to June ===
- 21 January – Agnes Steineger, painter (died 1965).
- 12 February – Vilhelm Dybwad, barrister and writer (died 1950).
- 19 February – Axel Thue, mathematician (died 1922)
- 28 February – Lars Jonson Haukaness, Norwegian American impressionist artist (died 1929)
- 21 May – Gunnar Berg, painter (died 1893)
- 23 June – Christian Fredrik Michelet, politician and Minister (died 1927)
- 26 June – Martin Løken, politician

=== July to December ===
- 15 August – Even Ulving, painter (died 1952).
- 3 September – Hans Aanrud, author, poet and playwright (died 1953)
- 30 October – Torger Holtsmark, farmer and politician (died 1926)
- 18 November – Frederik Macody Lund, historian (died 1943)
- 20 November – Jonas Schanche Kielland, jurist and politician (died 1925)
- 24 November – Alfred Larsen, sailor and Olympic gold medallist (died 1950)
- 28 November – Johan Henrik Rye Holmboe, businessperson, politician and Minister (died 1933)
- 12 December – Edvard Munch, painter and printmaker (died 1944)
- 31 December – Christian Albrecht Jakhelln, businessperson and politician (died 1945)

=== Full date unknown ===
- Adolf Agthe, architect (died 1941)
- Sigval Bergesen, ship-owner and politician (died 1956)
- Christian Theodor Holtfodt, politician (died 1930)
- Nils Riddervold Jensen, politician and Minister (died 1935)
- Elias C. Kiær, businessperson (died 1939)
- Paul Benjamin Vogt, politician and Minister (died 1947)

== Deaths ==
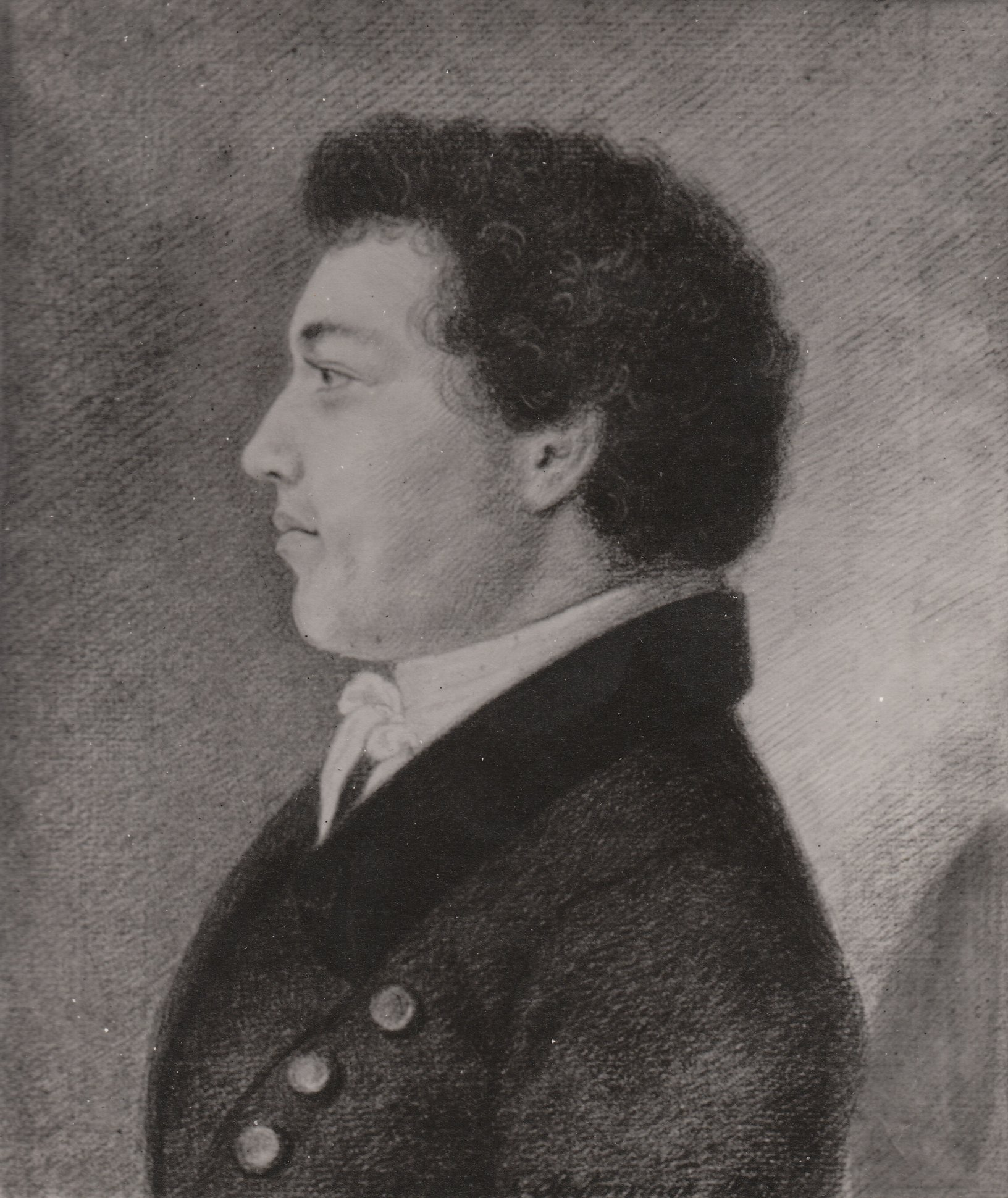
Jens Kaurin

- 17 February – Peter Severin Steenstrup, naval officer and businessperson (born 1807)
- 19 March – Christian Garup Meidell, military officer and politician (born 1780)
- 25 April – Paul Hansen Birch, military officer (born 1788)
- 25 May – Peter Andreas Munch, historian
- 6 July – Jens Matthias Pram Kaurin, professor of theology, biblical translator, and Lutheran priest (b. 1804).
- 5 August – Peter Feilberg, newspaper editor and politician (born 1800)
- 6 August – Jacob Kielland, businessperson, consul and politician (born 1788)
- 19 September – Hans Christian Heg, colonel and brigade commander in the Union Army during the American Civil War (born 1829)
- 18 December - Ulrik Frederik Anton de Schouboe, civil servant and politician (born 1782)

=== Full date unknown ===
- Gunleik Jonsson Helland, Hardanger fiddle maker (born 1828)
- Poul Christian Holst, politician and Minister (born 1776)
- Jacob Worm Skjelderup, politician and Minister (born 1804)
