= 1829 in Norway =

- Centuries: 17th; 18th; 19th; 20th; 21st
- Decades: 1800s; 1810s; 1820s; 1830s; 1840s
- See also: 1829 in Sweden; List of years in Norway

Events in the year 1829 in Norway.

== Incumbents ==
- Monarch: Charles III John.
- First Minister: Jonas Collett

== Events ==
- 17 May – Henrik Wergeland became a symbol of the fight for celebration of the constitution at May 17, which was later to become the Norwegian National Day. He became a public hero after the infamous "Battle of the Square" in Christiania.
- The present Kvitsøy Lighthouse was built.

== Births ==
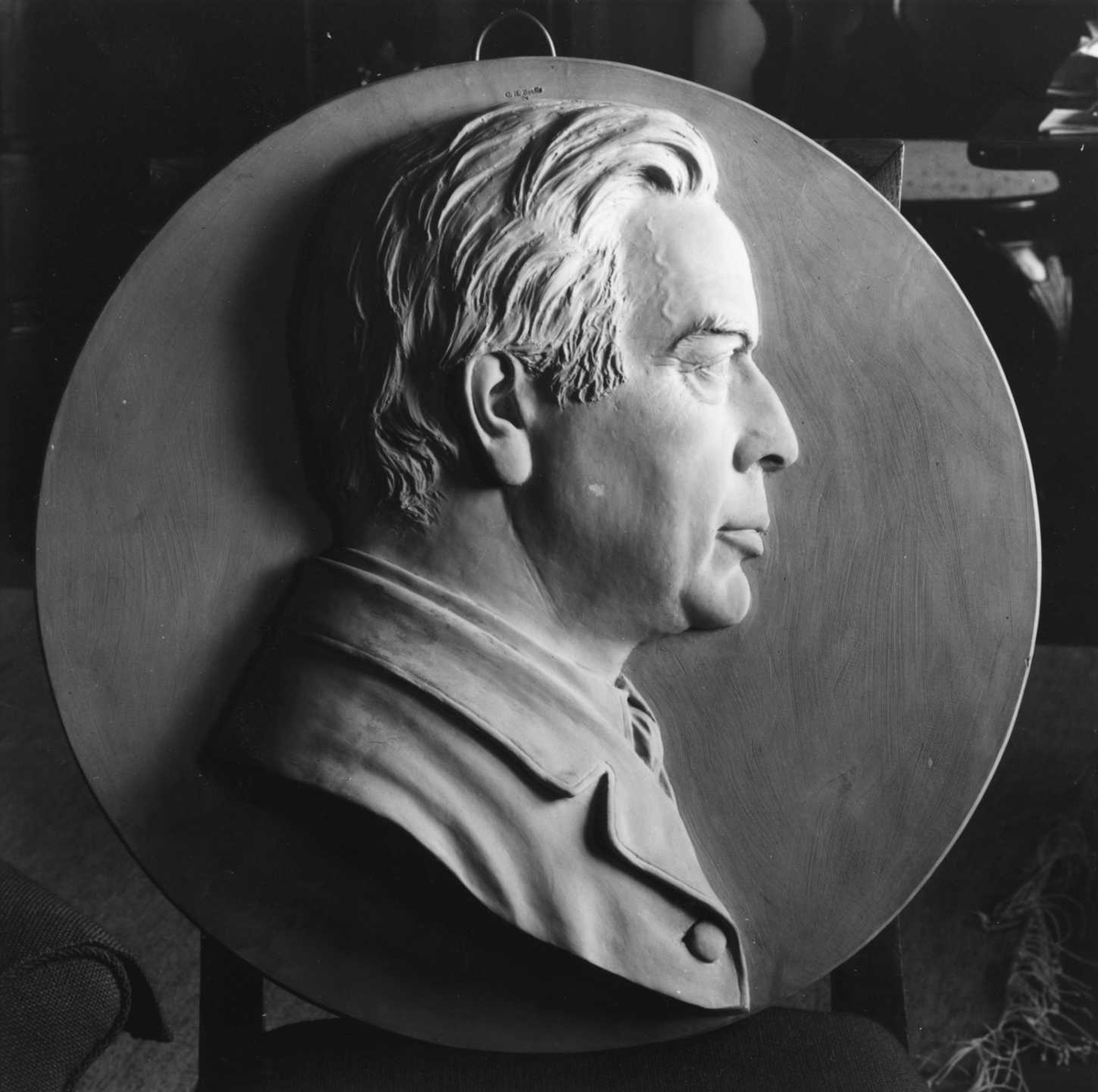
Georg Andreas Bull

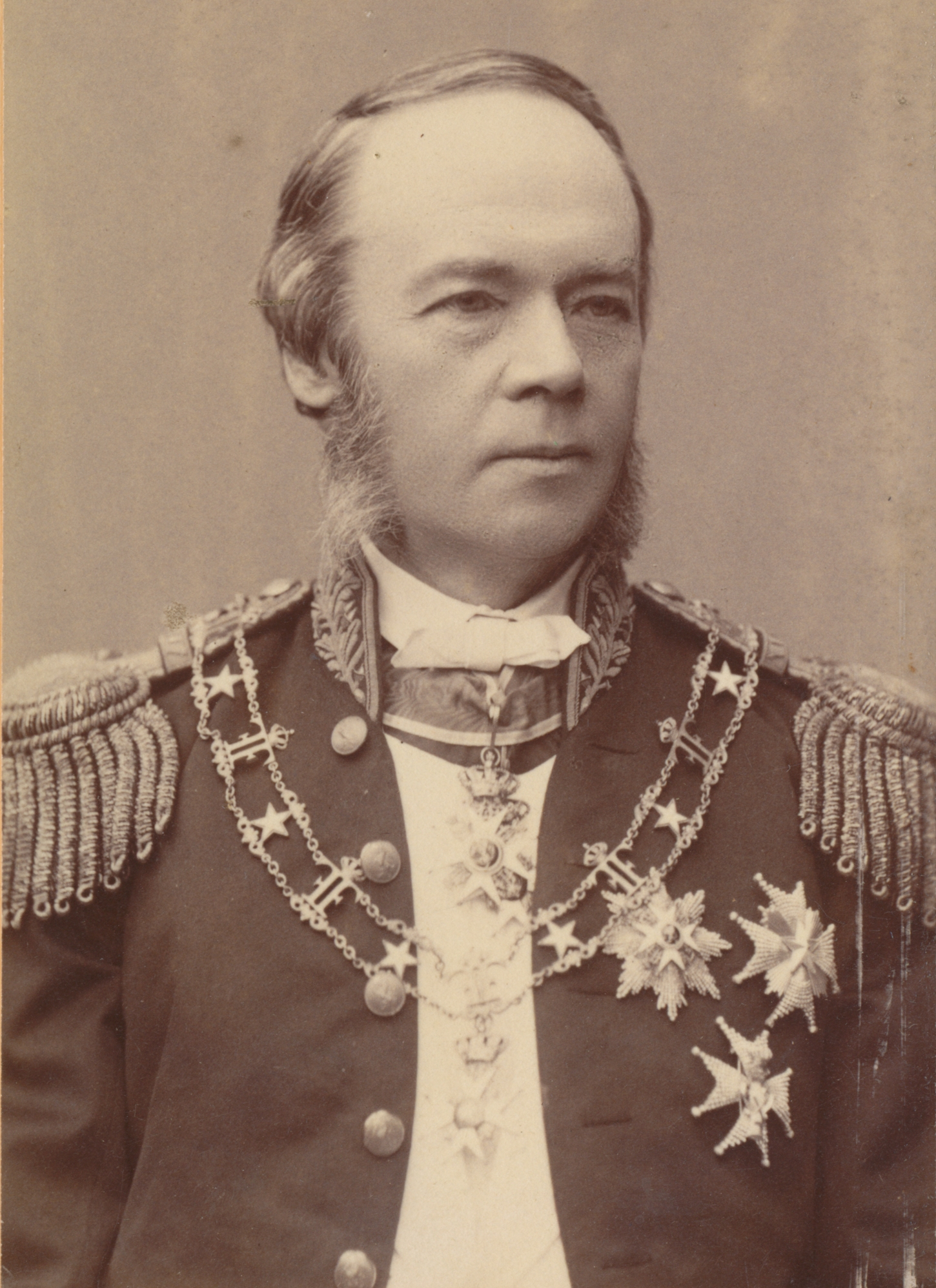
Ole Richter

- 9 January – Hans Christian Harboe Grønn, barrister and politician (d. 1902).
- 26 March – Georg Andreas Bull, architect and chief building inspector (d.1917)
- 6 April – Ole Irgens, politician (d.1906)
- 19 May – Julius Nicolai Jacobsen, businessperson and politician (d.1894)
- 15 June – Ulrik Frederik Christian Arneberg, politician (d.1911)
- 28 July – Josephine Sparre, courtier and royal mistress
- 28 September – Erik Bodom, painter (d. c1879)
- 21 December – Hans Christian Heg, colonel and brigade commander in the Union Army during the American Civil War (d.1863)

=== Full date unknown ===
- Ludvig Daae, politician (d.1893)
- Hans Christian Hanssen-Fossnæs, politician
- Hans Hagerup Krag, engineer (d.1907)
- Niels Mathiesen, politician and merchant (d.1900)
- Ole Richter, lawyer, politician and Prime Minister of Norway (d.1888)
- Lorentz Henrik Müller Segelcke, politician and Minister (d.1910)

== Deaths ==
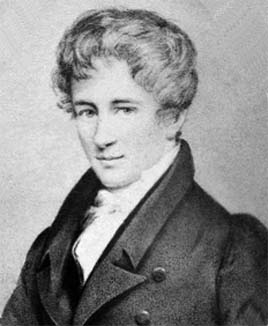
Niels Henrik Abel

- 6 April – Niels Henrik Abel, mathematician (b.1802)
- 6 December – Baltzar von Platen, Governor-general of Norway (b.1766)

=== Full date unknown ===
- Peder Jacobsen Bøgvald, politician (b.1762)
- Johan Randulf Bull, judge (b.1749)
- Ole Clausen Mørch, politician (b.1774)
- Lars Jakobson Thingnæsset, farmer and politician (b.1760)
