= 1830 in Norway =

- Centuries: 17th; 18th; 19th; 20th; 21st
- Decades: 1810s; 1820s; 1830s; 1840s; 1850s
- See also: 1830 in Sweden; List of years in Norway

Events in the year 1830 in Norway.

== Incumbents ==
- Monarch: Charles III John.
- First Minister: Jonas Collett

== Arts and literature ==
- Det Dramatiske Selskab in Kristiansund was founded.

== Births ==
- 6 February – Lars Hertervig, painter (d. 1902)
- 10 February – Andreas Leigh Aabel, physician and poet (d. 1901)
- 23 February – Magdalene Osenbroch, actress (d. 1854)
- 23 September – Jens Theodor Paludan Vogt, engineer (d. 1892)
- 26 September – Olaus Arvesen, educator and politician (d. 1917)

=== Full date unknown ===
- Ole Andreas Bachke, politician and Minister (d. 1890)
- Olav Jakobsen Høyem, teacher, telegrapher, supervisor of banknote printing and linguist (d. 1899)
- Hans Møller, politician, consul and businessperson (d. 1911)
- Hans Georg Jacob Stang, politician and Prime Minister (d. 1907)

== Deaths ==
- 13 January – Christian Magnus Falsen, statesman, jurist, and historian (b.1782)
- 14 April – Erike Kirstine Kolstad, the first professional native stage actress in Norway (b.1792)
- 22 April – Lars Johannes Irgens, jurist and politician (b.1775)
- 29 December – Hans Henrik Rode, military officer (b.1767)

=== Full date unknown ===
- Hans Hagerup Falbe, politician and Minister (b.1772)
