= 1856 in Norway =

- Centuries: 17th; 18th; 19th; 20th; 21st
- Decades: 1830s; 1840s; 1850s; 1860s; 1870s
- See also: 1856 in Sweden; List of years in Norway

Events in the year 1856 in Norway.

== Incumbents ==
- Monarch: Oscar I.
- First Minister: Jørgen Herman Vogt

== Events ==
- 12–18 July – The 7th Scandinavian Scientist Conference is held in Oslo.
- Christianssands Bryggeri is founded.

== Notable births ==
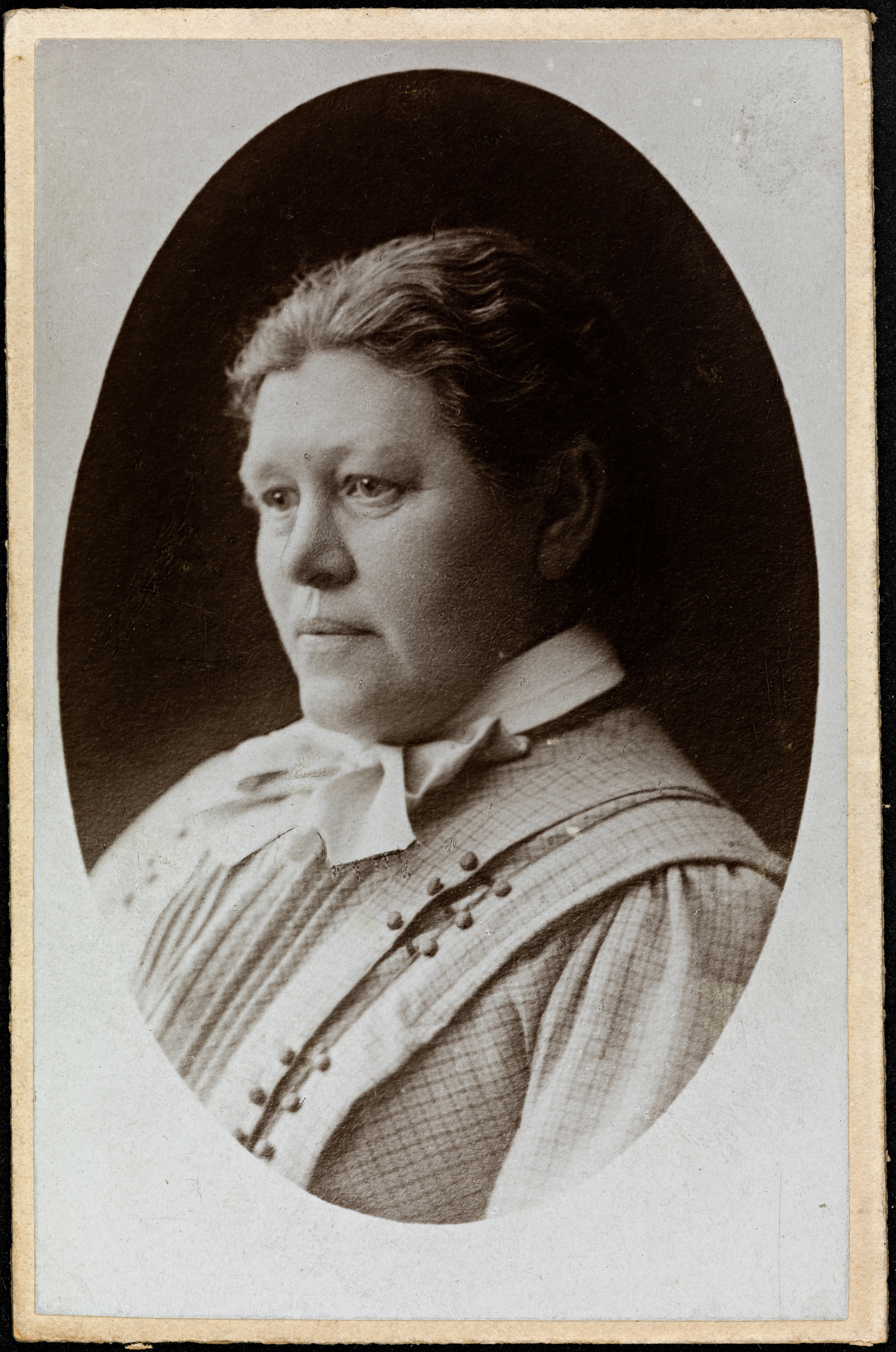
Anne Bolette Holsen

- 11 January – Christian Sinding, composer (died 1941)
- 17 January – Jens Bratlie, politician and Prime Minister of Norway (died 1939)
- 11 February – Torje Olsen Solberg, politician
- 13 March – Hans G. Jensen, tailor, trade unionist and politician (died 1922)
- 23 March – Johan Nordhagen, artist (died 1956)
- 13 April – Urania Marquard Olsen, Danish-born actress and theatre director (died 1932)
- 3 May – Inga Houge, actress (died 1926)
- 24 June – Haldor Johan Hanson, Norwegian-American hymn writer, publisher and author. (died 1929)
- 21 July – Anne Bolette Holsen, teacher and proponent for women's rights (died 1913).
- 6 August – Anton Johan Rønneberg, politician (died 1922)
- 18 August – John Grieg, printer, publisher and bookseller (died 1905).
- 11 September – Otto Jensen, bishop, politician and Minister (died 1918)
- 26 September – Anna Paaske, opera singer and music teacher (died 1935)
- 9 December – Gerhard Gran, literary historian, professor, magazine editor, essayist and biographer (died 1925)

=== Full date unknown ===
- Kristofer Kristofersson Hjeltnes, horticulturist and politician (died 1930)
- Jacob Marius Schøning, politician and Minister (died 1934)

== Notable deaths ==
- 26 February – Teis Lundegaard, farmer, shipowner, politician and representative at the Norwegian Constituent Assembly (born 1774)
- 1 July – Peder Jensen Fauchald, politician (born 1791)
- 15 September – Severin Løvenskiold, nobleman and politician (born 1777)

=== Full date unknown ===
- Andreas Aagaard Kiønig, judge and politician (born 1771)
- Nicolai Johan Lohmann Krog, politician and Minister (born 1787)
- Steinar Sulheim, mountain tourism pioneer (born 1815)
- Niels Andreas Thrap, politician (born 1793)
