= 1853 in Norway =

- Centuries: 17th; 18th; 19th; 20th; 21st
- Decades: 1830s; 1840s; 1850s; 1860s; 1870s
- See also: 1853 in Sweden; List of years in Norway

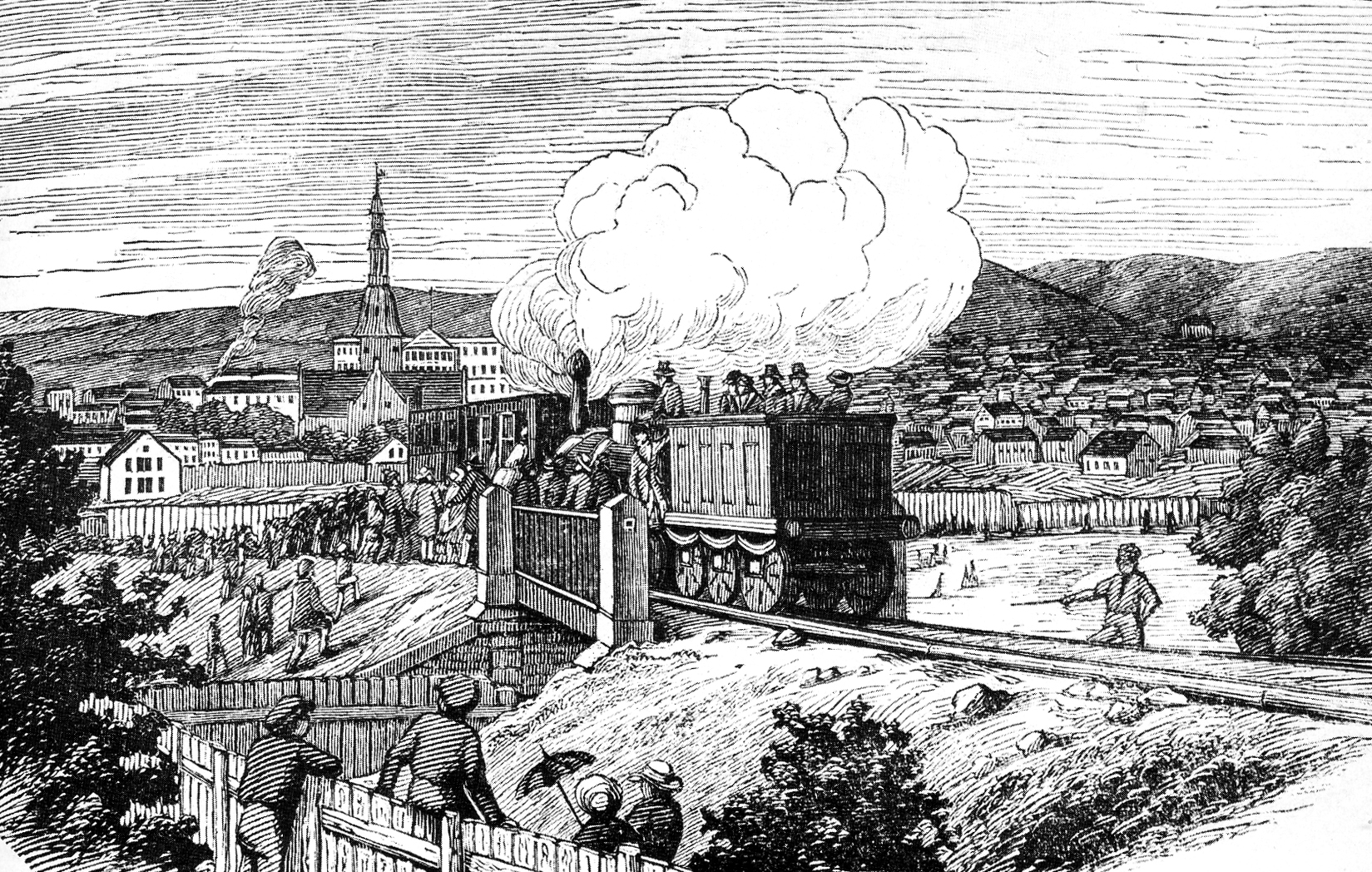
Hovedbanen's first trial run in 1853

Events in the year 1853 in Norway.

== Incumbents ==
- Monarch: Oscar I.
- First Minister: Nicolai Krog

== Events ==
- 24 August – The Royal Norwegian Navy Museum is founded.
- The present Lista Lighthouse was built.

== Notable births ==
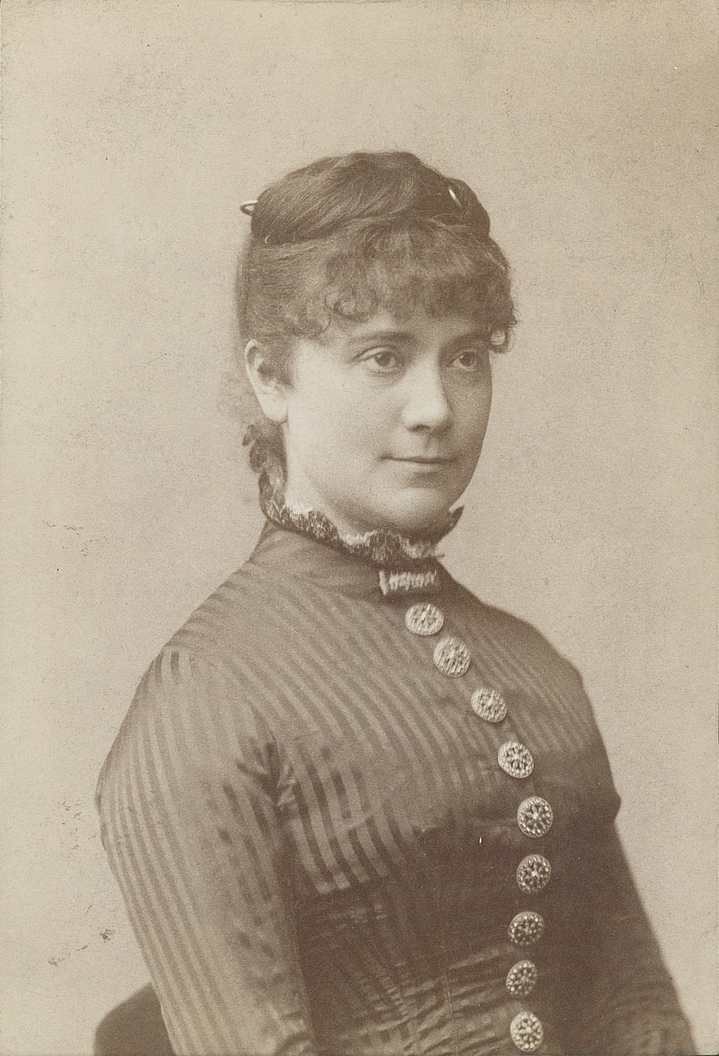
Sophie Reimers

- 22 January – Francis Hagerup, lawyer, diplomat, politician, and twice Prime Minister of Norway (died 1921)
- 28 March – Jacob Breda Bull, author (died 1930)
- 19 April – Sophie Reimers, actress (died 1932).
- 20 September – Dikken Zwilgmeyer, writer (died 1913).
- 14 October – Axel Christian Zetlitz Kielland, civil servant and diplomat (died 1924)
- 26 October – Kristian Vilhelm Koren Schjelderup, Sr., bishop (died 1913)
- 3 November – Hans Nilsen Hauge, priest, politician and Minister (died 1931)

=== Full date unknown ===
- Johan Magnus Halvorsen, politician (died 1922)
- Just Knud Qvigstad, politician and Minister (died 1957)

== Notable deaths ==
- 1 January – Valentin Christian Wilhelm Sibbern, government minister (born 1779).
- 23 June – Herman Garmann (born 1787), businessman and merchant.
- 3 July – Johan Gørbitz, painter (born 1782)
- 2 September – Andrine Christensen, actress and dancer (born 1814).
- 3 October – Hans Jacob Arnold Jensen, military officer and politician (born 1777)

=== Full date unknown ===
- Edvard Hagerup, solicitor and politician (born 1781)
- Peter Andreas Munch, historian (born 1810)
