= 1834 in Norway =

- Centuries: 17th; 18th; 19th; 20th; 21st
- Decades: 1810s; 1820s; 1830s; 1840s; 1850s
- See also: 1834 in Sweden; List of years in Norway

Events in the year 1834 in Norway.

== Incumbents ==
- Monarch: Charles III John.
- First Minister: Jonas Collett

== Events ==
- Aass Brewery is founded in Drammen. Norway's oldest brewery still active.

== Births ==
- 14 June – Emil Stang, jurist, politician and Prime Minister of Norway (d.1912)

=== Full date unknown ===
- Markus Nomil Iversen, ship-owner and politician
- Ole Anton Qvam, politician and Minister (d.1904)

== Deaths ==
- 20 September Johan Peter Strömberg, actor, dancer and theatre director, founder of the first public theatre of Norway (born 1773).

=== Full date unknown ===
- Jens Aars, priest and politician (b.1780)
