= 1772 in Norway =

- Centuries: 16th; 17th; 18th; 19th; 20th
- Decades: 1750s; 1760s; 1770s; 1780s; 1790s
- See also: 1772 in Denmark; List of years in Norway

Events in the year 1772 in Norway.

== Incumbents ==
- Monarch: Christian VII.

== Events ==
- 16 May - End of the Dano–Algerian War.
- September - Charles of Hesse was appointed commander-in-chief of the Norwegian army.
- German ceased to be the official language of command in the army, in favour of "Dano-Norwegian".

== Arts and literature ==
- February - The first public theatre in Norway, founded in Oslo by Martin Nürenbach, is dissolved.
- 30 April - The Norwegian Society (Det Norske Selskab), a literary society for Norwegian students in Copenhagen, is formed.
- September - The comedy-play Kierlighed uden Strømper, by Johan Herman Wessel, is first published.

== Births ==
- 3 January - Søren Georg Abel, priest and politician (died 1820)
- 1 February - Evert Andersen, navy officer (died 1809)
- 29 February - Hans Andersen Barlien, farmer and politician. (died 1842)
- 29 November - Peder Klykken, politician (died 1861)

=== Full date unknown ===
- Hans Hagerup Falbe, politician and Minister (died 1830)
- Morten Michael Kallevig, merchant (died 1827)
- Sveinung Svalastoga, rose painter (died 1809)

== Deaths ==
- 30 May – Peder von Todderud, Army general and landowner (b. 1691).
- 18 October – Gunder Gundersen Hammer, government official (b. 1725).
