= 1850 in Norway =

- Centuries: 17th; 18th; 19th; 20th; 21st
- Decades: 1830s; 1840s; 1850s; 1860s; 1870s
- See also: 1850 in Sweden; List of years in Norway

Events in the year 1850 in Norway.

== Incumbents ==
- Monarch: Oscar I.
- First Minister: Nicolai Krog

== Events ==
- May - The Labour Union delivered a petition to King Oscar I and the Norwegian Storting (parliament), which was signed by 13,000 members. The union asked for universal voting, the extension of mandatory military service to those with property, equality before the law, better schools, low or no border taxes on necessary goods, such as grains, and special support for poor farmers in the form of arable land on reasonable terms.
- June 19 – Princess Louise of the Netherlands marries Crown Prince Karl of Sweden-Norway.

== Arts and literature ==
- Henrik Ibsen's first play Catilina is written (but not performed until 1881)
- 26 September – Henrik Ibsen's second play, The Burial Mound, is performed at Christiania Theater

== Births ==
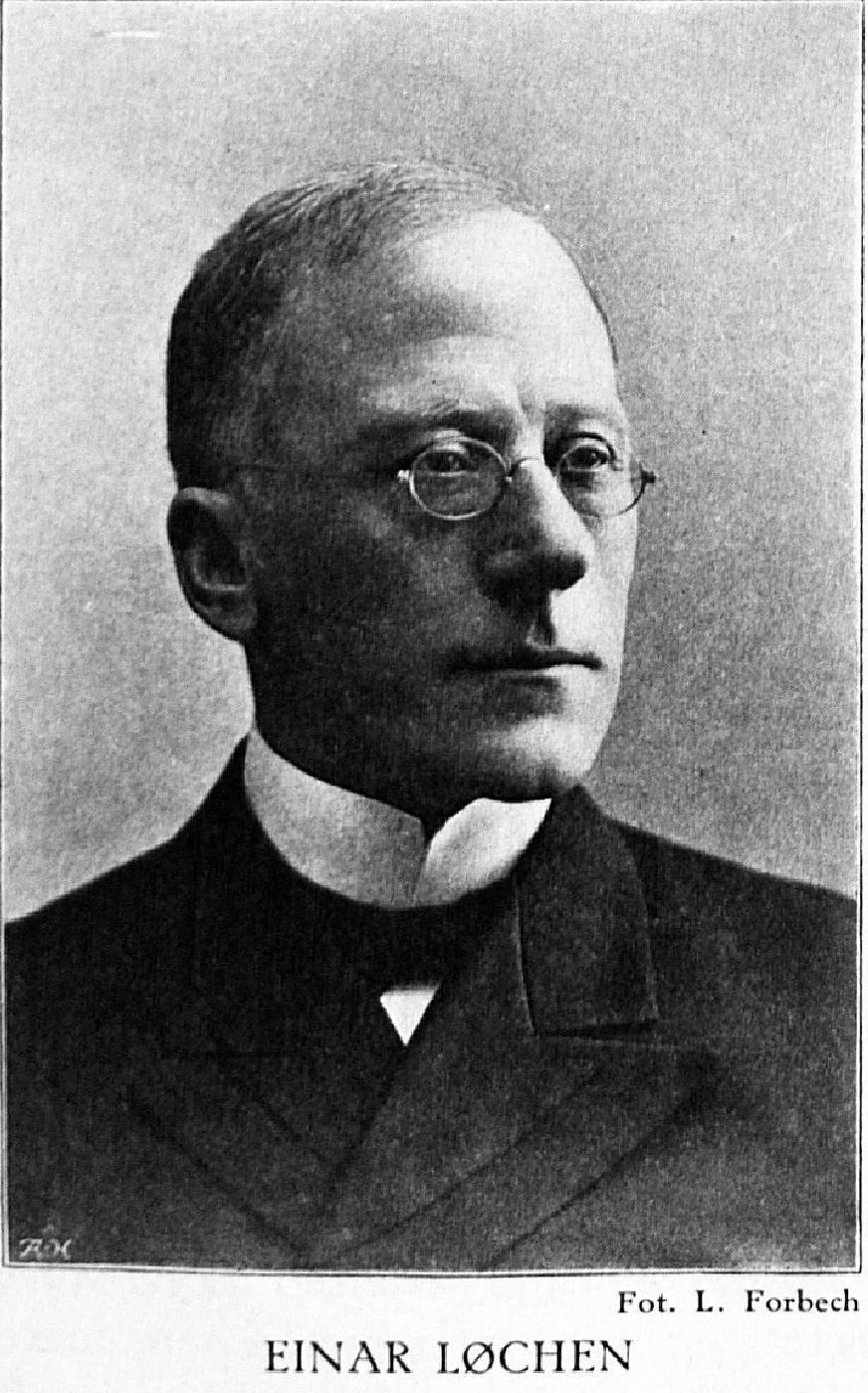
Einar Løchen

- 1 January – Oscar Jacobsen, engineer and politician (died 1902)
- 9 February – Hjalmar August Schiøtz, ophthalmologist (died 1927)
- 18 March – Olefine Moe, opera singer (died 1933)
- 4 July – Ole Olsen, organist, composer, conductor and military musician (died 1927)
- 6 October – Thomas Engelhart, jurist, politician and civil servant (died 1905).
- 8 October – Sven Aarrestad, writer, politician and leader in the Norwegian temperance movement (died 1942 in Norway)
- 17 October – Johannes Christiansen, politician (died 1913)
- 25 December – Elizabeth Fedde, Lutheran Deaconess who established the Norwegian Relief Society (died 1921)

=== Full date unknown ===
- Einar Løchen, jurist and politician (died 1908)
- Knut Eilevsson Steintjønndalen, Hardanger fiddle maker (died 1902)
- Karenus Kristofer Thinn, judge (died 1942)
- Ivar Peterson Tveiten, politician and Minister (died 1932)
- Erik V. Vullum, politician and author (died 1916)

== Deaths ==
- 28 March – Bernt Michael Holmboe, mathematician (born 1795).
- 10 September – Andreas Martin Seip, military officer and politician (born 1790)
- 8 December – Georg Sverdrup, philologist (born 1770)

=== Full date unknown ===
- Jens Gasmann, businessperson and politician (born 1776)
- Christian Ulrik Kastrup, jurist, military officer and politician (born 1784)
- Jacob Andreas Wille, priest and politician (born 1777)
