= 1773 in Norway =

- Centuries: 16th; 17th; 18th; 19th; 20th
- Decades: 1750s; 1760s; 1770s; 1780s; 1790s
- See also: 1773 in Denmark; List of years in Norway

Events in the year 1773 in Norway.

== Incumbents ==
- Monarch: Christian VII.

== Events ==
- 2 November - The Sunnmøre Practical Agricultural Society was founded.
- The Norwegian Mapping Authority, Norway's national mapping agency, was founded.

== Births ==
- 21 March - Nicolay Peter Drejer, military officer (died 1808)
- 2 May - Henrik Steffens, philosopher, scientist, and poet (died 1845)
- 27 July - Jacob Aall, historian and statesman (died 1844)
- 19 August - Johan Peter Strömberg, actor, dancer and theatre director, founder of the first public theatre of Norway (dead 1834).
- 4 October - Gabriel Lund, merchant and representative at the Norwegian Constituent Assembly (died 1832)

=== Full date unknown ===
- Johan Ernst Mejdell, jurist and politician

== Deaths ==
- 23 September - Johan Ernst Gunnerus, bishop and botanist (born 1718)

=== Full date unknown ===
- Jakob Klukstad, woodcarver (born 1705).
