= 1776 in Norway =

- Centuries: 16th; 17th; 18th; 19th; 20th
- Decades: 1750s; 1760s; 1770s; 1780s; 1790s
- See also: 1776 in Denmark; List of years in Norway

Events in the year 1776 in Norway.

== Incumbents ==
- Monarch: Christian VII.

== Events ==
- 15 January – A Danish-Norwegian Nationality Act reserves state offices for Norwegian, Danish and Holstein citizens.
- Blaafarveværket, a mining and industrial company in Modum, was established.
- The first Chief of police is hired in Christianssand.

== Arts and literature ==
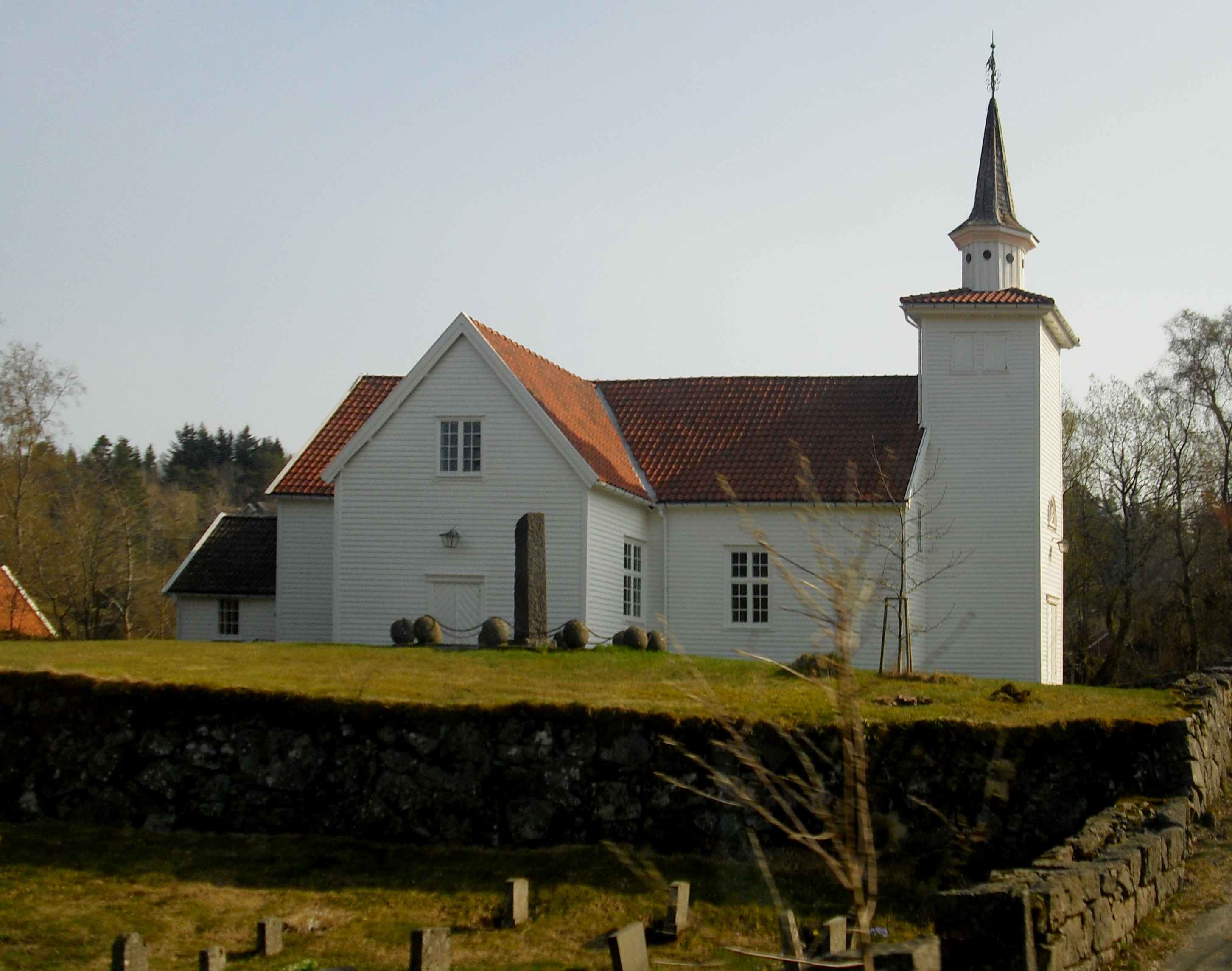
Spind Church

- Spind Church was built.

== Births ==
- 9 August - Jacob Munch, painter and military officer (died 1839)

=== Full date unknown ===
- Jens Gasmann, businessperson and politician (died 1850)
- Poul Christian Holst, politician and Minister (died 1863)
- Hilmar Meincke Krohg, politician (died 1851)

== Deaths ==
- Henrik Bech, woodcarver (born c.1718).
