= 1854 in Norway =

- Centuries: 17th; 18th; 19th; 20th; 21st
- Decades: 1830s; 1840s; 1850s; 1860s; 1870s
- See also: 1854 in Sweden; List of years in Norway

Events in the year 1854 in Norway.

== Incumbents ==
- Monarch: Oscar I.
- First Minister: Nicolai Krog

== Events ==
- 26 August – A new conscription law was sanctioned, under which all Norwegian men regardless of condition and position had an obligation to serve in the armed forces.
- 1 September – The first Norwegian railway, Hovedbanen between Oslo and Eidsvoll, is opened. This also constitutes the establishment of the now state owned Norwegian State Railways.

== Births ==
- 4 January – Henrik Jæger, literary historian (died 1895).
- 9 February – Ole Georg Gjøsteen, educator and politician (died 1936)
- 14 March – Ole Olsen Malm, physician, veterinarian, civil servant and politician (died 1917).
- 25 March – Tycho Kielland, jurist and journalist (died 1904)
- 16 June – Herbjørn Gausta, artist (died 1924)
- 2 September – Hans Jæger, writer, philosopher and anarchist political activist (died 1910).
- 2 October – Mathias Larsen Blilie, politician
- 5 October – Haakon Ditlev Lowzow, military officer, politician and Minister (died 1915)
- 16 October – Einar Sundt, businessman, writer and publisher (died 1917).
- 31 October – Otto Sverdrup, Arctic scientist and explorer (died 1930)

=== Full date unknown ===
- Bernhard Brænne, politician and Minister (died 1927)
- Knut Johannes Hougen, politician and Minister (died 1954)
- Nils Olaf Hovdenak, politician and Minister (died 1942)
- Ivar Kleiven, local historian and poet (died 1934)
- Fredrik Anton Martin Olsen Nalum, politician and Minister (died 1935)
- Christian Skredsvig, painter and writer (died 1924)
- Johan Turi, first Sami author to publish work (died 1936)

== Deaths ==
- 27 January – Andreas Samuelsen Vibstad, politician (born 1783)
- 11 February – Magdalene Osenbroch, actress (born 1830)
- 1 April – Peter Motzfeldt, politician and Minister (born 1777)
- 29 July - Jørgen von Cappelen Knudtzon, businessman and patron of the arts (born 1784)
- 14 October – Aslak Hætta, Sami leader, executed (born 1824)
- 12 December – Georg Jacob Bull, jurist and politician (born 1785)
- 21 December – Oluf Borch de Schouboe, politician and Minister (born 1777)

=== Full date unknown ===
- Samuel Mathiassen Føyn, ship-owner and politician (born 1786)
- Nicolai Niels Nielsen, priest and politician (born 1777)
- Johan Frederik Thorne, businessperson and politician (born 1801)
