= 1837 in Norway =

- Centuries: 17th; 18th; 19th; 20th; 21st
- Decades: 1810s; 1820s; 1830s; 1840s; 1850s
- See also: 1837 in Sweden; List of years in Norway

Events in the year 1837 in Norway.

== Incumbents ==
- Monarch: Charles III John.
- First Minister: Nicolai Krog

== Events ==
- 14 January – Formannskapsdistrikt was created in a bill approved by the Parliament of Norway and signed into law by King Carl Johan.

== Arts and literature ==
- Strömberg Theatre re-opened under the name Christiania Theatre.

== Births ==
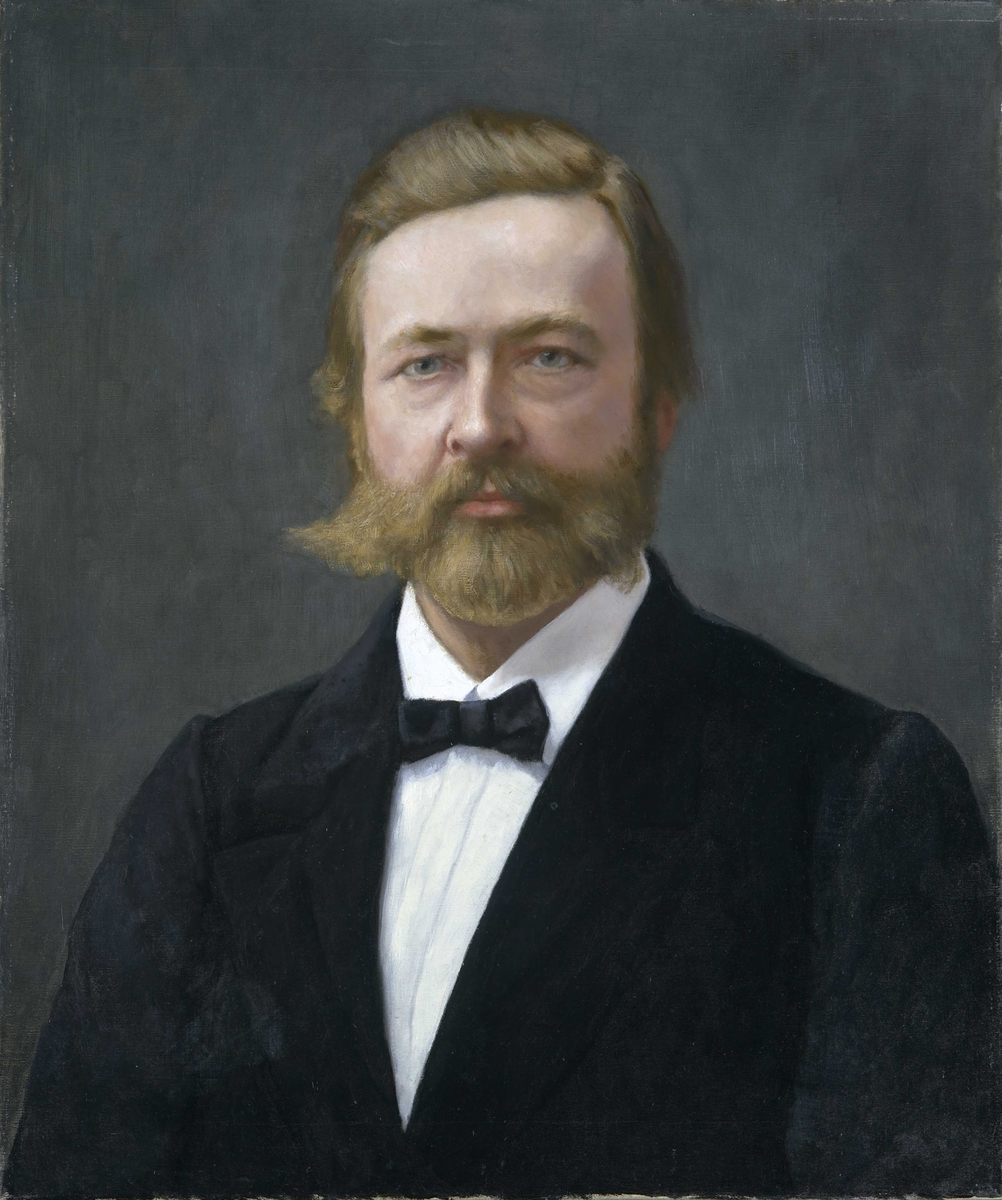
Johannes Bergh

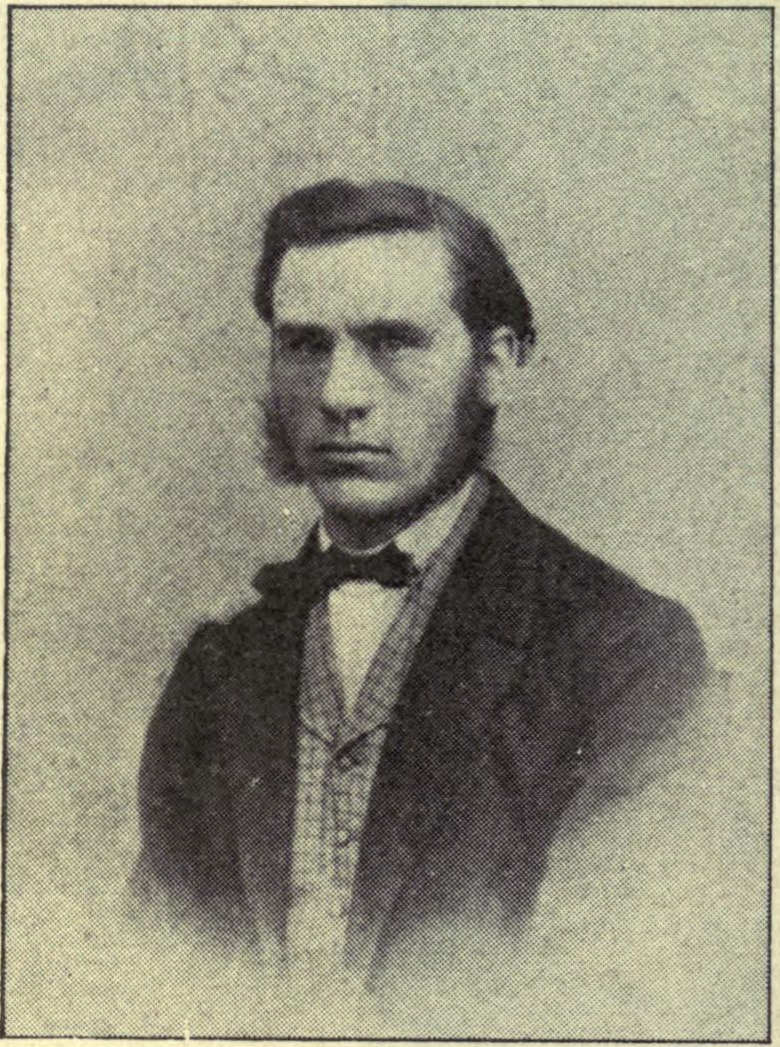
Johannes Skar

- 8 February – Elise Aubert, novelist, short-story writer, and non-fiction writer (d. 1909).
- 18 February – Johannes Bergh, barrister (d. 1906).
- 16 March – Hassa Horn Sr., civil servant (d. 1921)
- 25 March – Lauritz Jenssen, businessperson and politician (d.1899)
- 19 April – Fredrik Meltzer Wallem, journalist and writer (d. 1922)
- 20 April – Georg Ossian Sars, marine biologist (d.1927)
- 11 May – Lorentz Severin Skougaard, singer (d. 1885)
- 14 July – Hermann Hansen Aarsrud, politician (d. 1927).
- 27 July – Ole Vollan, educator, editor and politician (d.1907)
- 18 August – Marcus Pløen Ingstad, jurist and educator (d. 1918)
- 5 September – Vincent Stoltenberg Lerche, painter (d. 1892).
- 16 September – Rasmus Theisen, civil servant and politician (d. 1908)
- 26 September – Hjalmar Heiberg, physician and a professor (d. 1897).
- 8 October – Otto Winter-Hjelm, musician, conductor, writer, composer and music critic (d. 1931)
- 15 October – Carl Herman Halvorsen, jurist and politician (d. 1918)
- 18 November – Johannes Skar, educator and folklorist (d. 1914).
- 18 December – Paul Andreas Jetmundsen Aklestad, politician (d.1924)
- 20 December – Georg August Thilesen, politician and Minister (d. 1917).

=== Full date unknown ===
- Ole Herman Johannes Krag, gun designer (d.1916)
- Hans Mustad, businessperson (d.1918)
- Carl Ingwart Theodor Rynning, government official and politician (d. 1892)

== Deaths ==
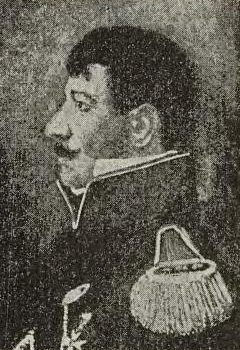
Eilert Ramm

- 8 February – Jens Johan Vangensten, politician (b.1766)
- 26 February – Jørgen Young, merchant and politician (b. 1781).
- 11 March – Peder von Cappelen, merchant and politician (b. 1763).
- 15 March – Eilert Waldemar Preben Ramm, military officer and politician (b. 1769).
- 27 April – Lorentz Johannsen, merchant and member of the Storting (b. 1769)
- 5 October – Ole Knudsen Tvedten, farmer and district sheriff (b. 1757/8)
- 14 December – Andreas Arntzen, politician (b.1777)

=== Full date unknown ===
- Christian Adolph Diriks, politician and minister (b.1775)
