= 1828 in Norway =

- Centuries: 17th; 18th; 19th; 20th; 21st
- Decades: 1800s; 1810s; 1820s; 1830s; 1840s
- See also: 1828 in Sweden; List of years in Norway

Events in the year 1828 in Norway.

== Incumbents ==
- Monarch: Charles III John.
- First Minister: Jonas Collett

== Events ==
- Celebrating the Norwegian Constitution Day was banned, but the ban was lifted the next year.

== Births ==
- 20 March – Henrik Ibsen, playwright (d.1906)
- 14 April – Johan Lauritz Sundt, industrialist (d.1889).
- 15 November – Johannes Skaar, bishop and hymnologist (died 1904).

=== Full date unknown ===
- Gunleik Jonsson Helland, Hardanger fiddle maker (d.1863)
- Bøicke Johan Rulffs Koren, politician and Minister (d.1909)

== Deaths ==
- 22 June – Lars Ingier, military officer, road manager, land owner and mill owner (b.1760).
- 15 August – Isaach Isaachsen, politician (b.1774)
- 2 September – Mathias Bonsak Krogh, bishop and politician (born 4. October 1754)

=== Full date unknown ===
- Johan Ernst Berg, politician (b.1768)
- Christian Krohg, politician and Minister (b.1777)
