= 1780 in Norway =

- Centuries: 17th; 18th; 19th; 20th
- Decades: 1760s; 1770s; 1780s; 1790s; 1800s
- See also: 1780 in Denmark; List of years in Norway

Events in the year 1780 in Norway.

== Incumbents ==
- Monarch: Christian VII.

== Events ==
- August – Denmark–Norway joins the First League of Armed Neutrality.

== Arts and literature ==
- Det Dramatiske Selskab in Oslo is founded.

== Births ==
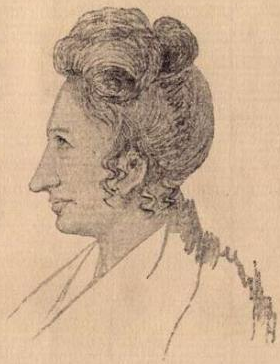
Conradine Birgitte Dunker

- 30 January – Christian Garup Meidell, military officer and politician (died 1863)
- 25 August – Conradine Birgitte Dunker, socialite and writer (died 1866)
- 9 November – Nicolai Wergeland, priest, writer and politician (died 1848).

=== Full date unknown ===
- Jens Aars, priest and politician (died 1834)
- Hans Eleonardus Møller, Sr., businessperson (died 1860)

== Deaths ==
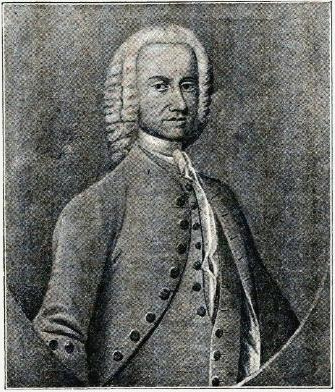
Carl Deichman

- 21 April – Carl Deichman, businessman, mine operator, book collector and philanthropist (born c.1705).
- 5 December – Jens Boalth, educator (born 1725).

=== Full date unknown ===
- Anders Porsanger, Sami linguist and priest (born 1735)
- Martin Nürenbach, theatre director
