= 1827 in Norway =

- Centuries: 17th; 18th; 19th; 20th; 21st
- Decades: 1800s; 1810s; 1820s; 1830s; 1840s
- See also: 1827 in Sweden; List of years in Norway

Events in the year 1827 in Norway.

== Incumbents ==
- Monarch: Charles III John.
- First Minister: Jonas Collett

== Events ==
- Count Baltzar von Platen is appointed Governor-general of Norway.

== Arts and literature ==
- Christiania Offentlige Theater is founded by Johan Peter Strömberg.

== Births ==
- 24 February – Haaken C. Mathiesen, landowner and businessperson (d.1913)
- 21 May – Axel Winge, politician (d.1893)
- 13 October – Johan Christian Tandberg Castberg, newspaper founder and editor and politician (d.1899)

=== Full date unknown ===
- Knud Bergslien, painter and teacher (d.1908)
- Nils Christian Egede Hertzberg, politician and Minister (d.1911)
- Dan Weggeland, artist (d.1918)

== Deaths ==
- 8 May – Morten Michael Kallevig, merchant (b.1772).
- 24 May – Anders Lysgaard, farmer, sheriff and representative at the Norwegian Constituent Assembly (b.1756).

=== Full date unknown ===
- Mathias Sommerhielm, politician (b.1764)
