= 1831 in Norway =

- Centuries: 17th; 18th; 19th; 20th; 21st
- Decades: 1810s; 1820s; 1830s; 1840s; 1850s
- See also: 1831 in Sweden; List of years in Norway

Events in the year 1831 in Norway.

== Incumbents ==
- Monarch: Charles III John.
- First Minister: Jonas Collett

== Arts and literature ==
- The first opera was performed in Norway, Deux mots by Nicolas Dalayrac, it was performed in Oslo, directed by August Schrumpf with Augusta Smith in the main part.
- Emilie da Fonseca is employed at Christiania Theatre.

== Births ==
- 5 January – Niels Stockfleth Darre Eckhoff, architect (d.1914)
- 18 June – Peter Nicolai Arbo, painter (d.1892)
- 21 August – Hans Lars Helgesen, Member of the Legislative Assembly of British Columbia
- 4 November – Peter Andreas Blix, architect and engineer (d.1901)

=== Full date unknown ===
- Hans Rasmus Astrup, politician (d.1898)
- Louise Brun, actor (d.1866)
- Svend Adolph Solberg, politician (d.1890)

== Deaths ==
- 22 January – Johan August Sandels, soldier and politician (b.1764)
- 28 January – Hans Hein Nysom, priest and politician (b.1767)
- Hilchen Sommerschild
