= 1774 in Norway =

- Centuries: 16th; 17th; 18th; 19th; 20th
- Decades: 1750s; 1760s; 1770s; 1780s; 1790s
- See also: 1774 in Denmark; List of years in Norway

Events in the year 1774 in Norway.

== Incumbents ==
- Monarch: Christian VII.

== Events ==
- 22 February - The town of Stathelle was founded.
- 11 October - Det nyttige Selskab, a non-profit organization, was founded in Bergen.

== Births ==
- 25 May - Isaach Isaachsen, politician (died 1828)
- 2 August - Ole Clausen Mørch, politician (died 1829)
- 8 October - Teis Lundegaard, farmer, shipowner, politician and representative at the Norwegian Constituent Assembly (died 1856)

== Deaths ==
- 25 February – Knud Leem, linguist (born 1697).
- 11 August – Frederik Nannestad, bishop (born 1693)
