= 1779 in Norway =

- Centuries: 16th; 17th; 18th; 19th; 20th
- Decades: 1750s; 1760s; 1770s; 1780s; 1790s
- See also: 1779 in Denmark; List of years in Norway

Events in the year 1779 in Norway.

== Incumbents ==
- Monarch: Christian VII.

== Events ==
- 23 November - Magnus Theiste was sentenced by the Supreme Court to be removed from his office as County Governor of Nordre Bergenhus amt, because of his involvement with corruption.
- Mandal is given town status as a ladested.

== Births ==
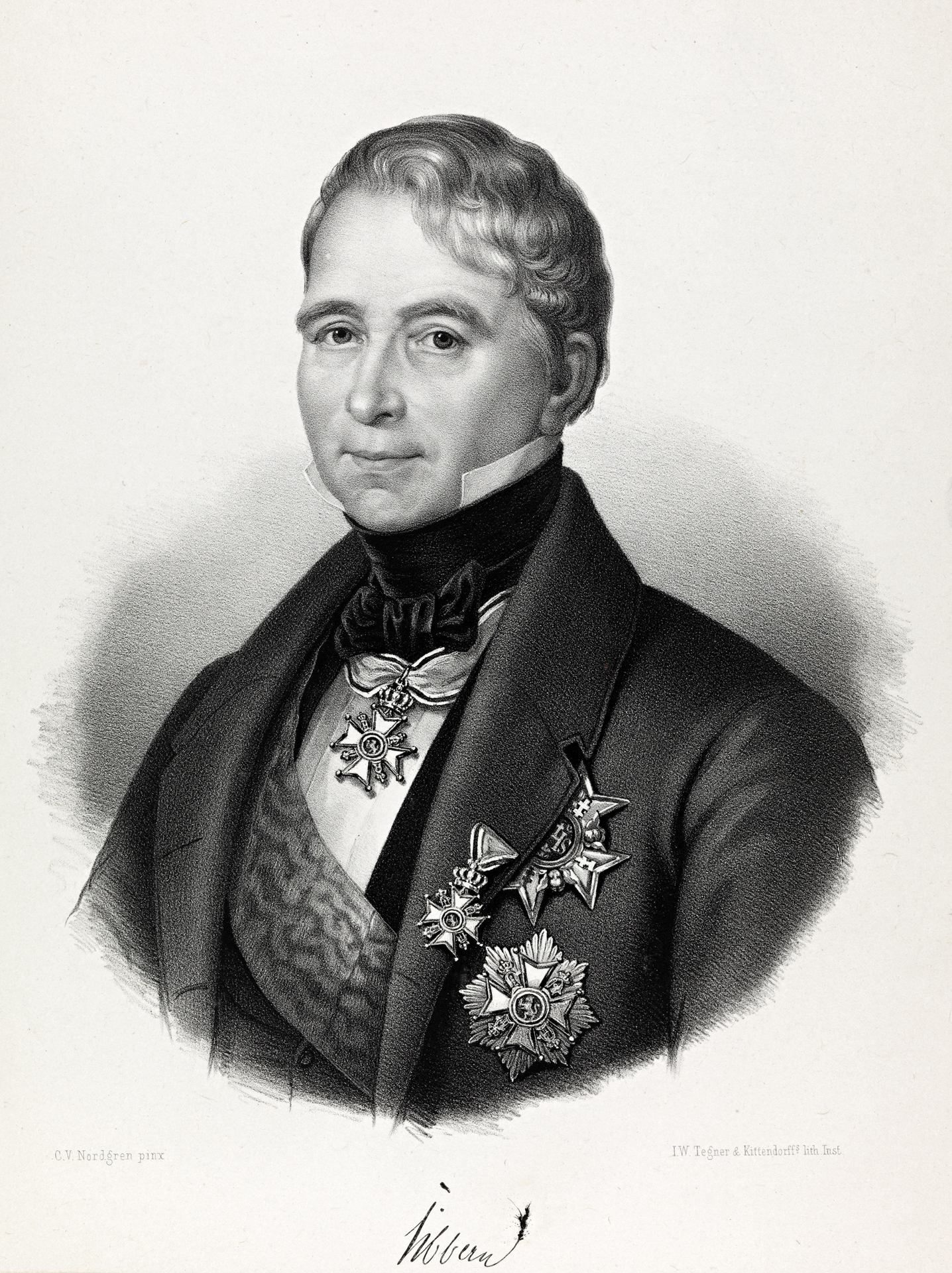
Valentin Sibbern

- 12 February – Jens Jensen Gram, jurist and politician (died 1824).
- 10 August – Carl Rønneberg, merchant and ship owner (died 1858).
- 27 August – Hovel Helseth, industrial pioneer (died 1865).
- 19 September – Valentin Christian Wilhelm Sibbern, government minister (died 1853).
- 21 September (in France) – Johan Caspar Herman Wedel-Jarlsberg, politician and nobleman (died 1840).
- 29 September – Fredrik Meltzer, businessman and politician (died 1855).
- 2 November – Frederik Motzfeldt, politician (died 1848).
- 8 November – Wollert Konow, merchant and vice consul (died 1839).

=== Full date unknown ===
- Peder Paulsen Balke, farmer and politician (died 1840).
- Anders Hansen Grønneberg, farmer and politician (died 1819).

== Deaths ==
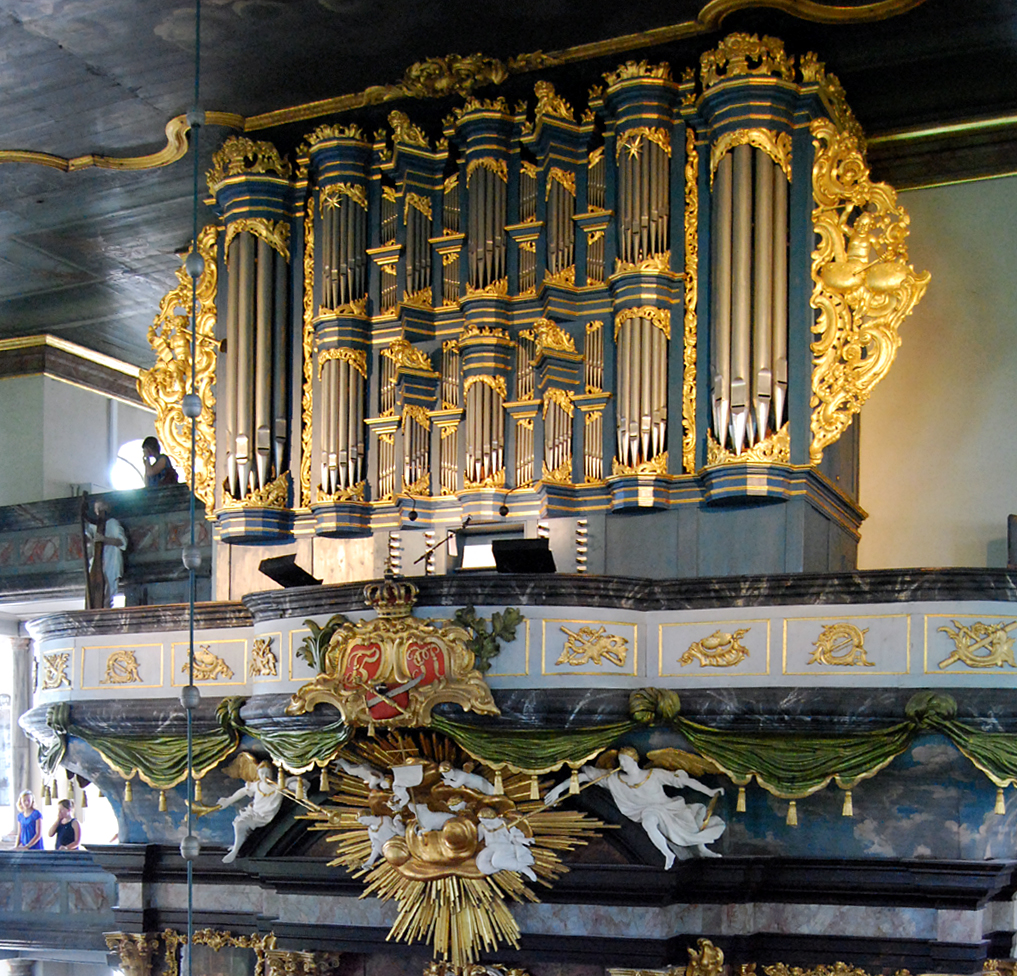
The organ in Kongsberg Church, built by Gottfried Heinrich Gloger

- 5 January – Niels Thaaning, painter (born c.1732).

=== Full date unknown ===
- Gottfried Heinrich Gloger, organ builder (born 1710).
