= 1824 in Norway =

- Centuries: 17th; 18th; 19th; 20th; 21st
- Decades: 1800s; 1810s; 1820s; 1830s; 1840s
- See also: 1824 in Sweden; List of years in Norway

Events in the year 1824 in Norway.

== Incumbents ==
- Monarch: Charles III John.
- First Minister: Jonas Collett

== Arts and literature ==
- 8 August – Bø Church was consecrated.
- Hadsel Church was consecrated.

== Births ==
- 24 January – Aslak Hætta, Sami leader, executed (d.1854)
- 24 August – Niels Mathias Rye, politician (d.1905)
- 4 October – Morten Diderik Emil Lambrechts, jurist and politician (d.1900)
- 10 December – Aasta Hansteen, painter, writer, and early feminist (d.1908)

=== Full date unknown ===
- Henrik Laurentius Helliesen, politician and Minister (d.1900)
- Johan Jørgen Schwartz, politician and businessperson (d.1898)

== Deaths ==
- 13 March – Carsten Anker, businessman, civil servant and politician (born 1747)
- 29 March – Hans Nielsen Hauge, revivalist lay preacher and writer (born 1771)
- 15 May – Johan Michael Lund, lawyer and Prime Minister of the Faroe Islands (born 1753)
- 8 October - Frants Philip Hopstock, priest (born 1746
- 2 November – Jens Jensen Gram, jurist and politician (born 1779).
- 10 December – Peder Anker, businessman and politician (born 1749)

=== Full date unknown ===
- Johan Andreas Altenburg, merchant and shipowner (born 1763)
- Just Henrik Ely, military officer (born 1759).
