= 1778 in Norway =

- Centuries: 16th; 17th; 18th; 19th; 20th
- Decades: 1750s; 1760s; 1770s; 1780s; 1790s
- See also: 1778 in Denmark; List of years in Norway

Events in the year 1778 in Norway.

== Incumbents ==
- Monarch: Christian VII.

== Events ==
- 14 January - The Anker family were ennobled.

== Arts and literature ==
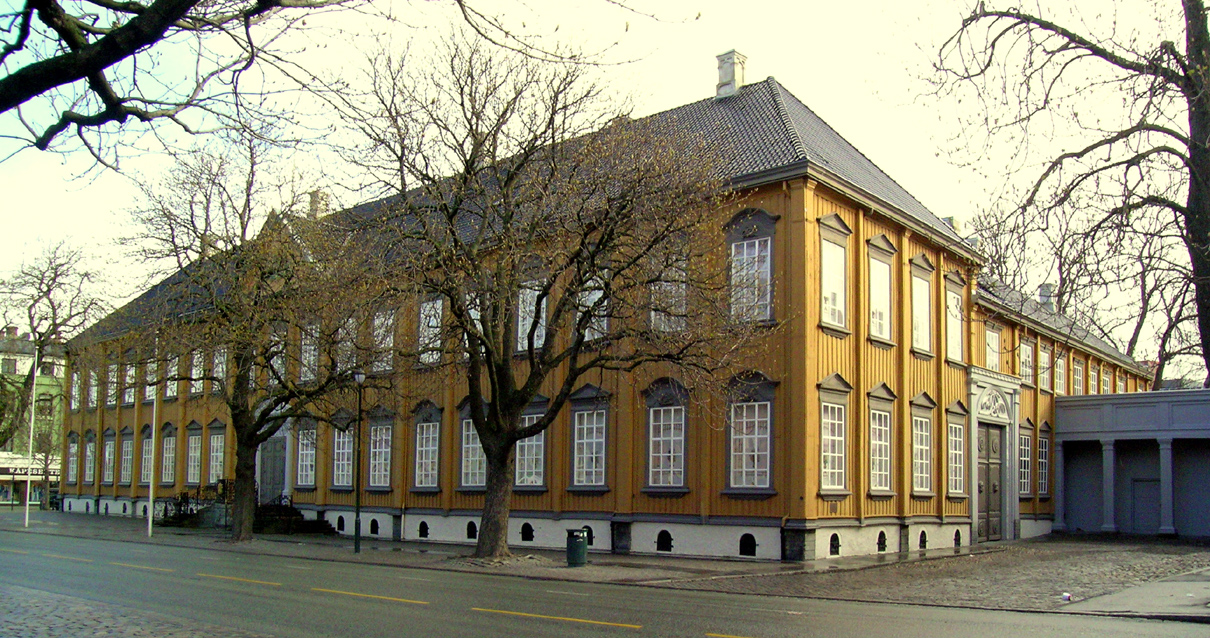
Stiftsgården.

- The construction of Stiftsgården was finished.
- Claus Fasting starts publishing the literary magazine Provinzialblade, in Bergen.

== Births ==
- 30 May - Jens Rynning, priest (died 1857)
- 11 November - Nils Astrup, politician (died 1835)
- 7 December - Wilhelm Frimann Koren Christie, a Norwegian constitutional father, known for being the constitutional assembly's writer (died 1849)
- 23 December - Johan Reinhardt, professor in zoology (died 1845)

=== Full date unknown ===
- Sara Oust, revivalist lay preacher (died 1822)
