= 1775 in Norway =

- Centuries: 16th; 17th; 18th; 19th; 20th
- Decades: 1750s; 1760s; 1770s; 1780s; 1790s
- See also: 1775 in Denmark; List of years in Norway

Events in the year 1775 in Norway.

== Incumbents ==
- Monarch: Christian VII.

== Arts and literature ==
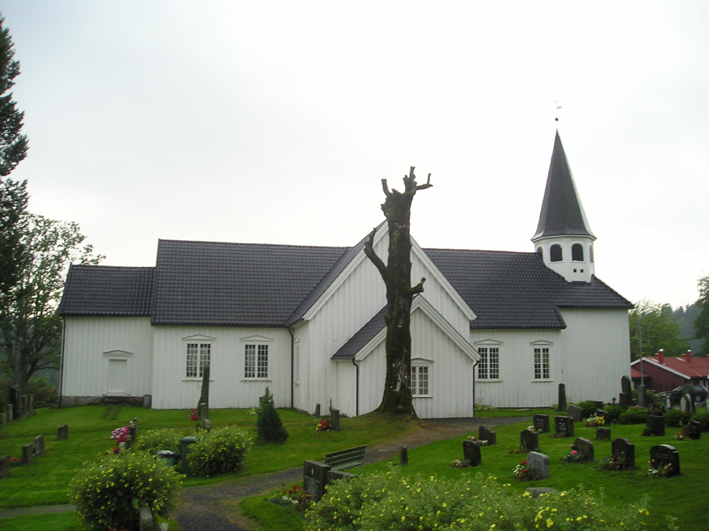
Drangedal Church

- Drangedal Church was built.

== Births ==
- 11 March - Nils Landmark, jurist, farmer and politician (died 1859)
- 15 May – Enevold Steenblock Høyum, Norwegian military officer, representative at the Norwegian Constitutional Assembly (died 1830)
- 9 October - Lars Johannes Irgens, jurist and politician (died 1830)
- 17 October - Ole Paulssøn Haagenstad, politician (died 1866)

=== Full date unknown ===
- Christian Adolph Diriks, politician and Minister (died 1837)
- Jens Erichstrup, politician (died 1826)
