= 1851 in Norway =

- Centuries: 17th; 18th; 19th; 20th; 21st
- Decades: 1830s; 1840s; 1850s; 1860s; 1870s
- See also: 1851 in Sweden; List of years in Norway

Events in the year 1851 in Norway.

== Incumbents ==
- Monarch: Oscar I.
- First Minister: Nicolai Krog

== Events ==
- Hattemakerfeiden, labour revolts in Ringerike.
- Norwegians starts to settle at the mouth of the Jakobselva river, and the area develops into the village of Grense Jakobselv.

== Arts and literature ==
- 10 January – The Norwegian Booksellers Association (Den Norske Bokhandlerforening) is founded.

== Births ==
=== January to June ===
- 2 January – Haldor Boen, teacher and politician in America (died 1912)
- 25 January – Arne Garborg, writer (died 1924)
- 28 January – Andreas Aubert, art historian (died 1913)
- 12 February – Randi Blehr, women’s rights activist (died 1928).
- 8 May – Ole Dehli, organizational leader (died 1924).
- 11 June – Oscar Borg, composer (died 1930)

=== July to December ===
- 23 July – Peder Severin Krøyer, painter (died 1909)
- 20 August – Abraham Berge, politician and Minister (died 1936)
- 23 September – Ola Thommessen, newspaper editor (died 1942)
- 29 September – Rasmus Flo, philologist, teacher and magazine editor (died 1905).
- 2 October – Elias Sunde, politician and Minister (died 1910).
- 30 October – Leonhard Hess Stejneger, zoologist (died 1943)
- 10 November – Waldemar Christofer Brøgger, geologist and mineralogist (died 1940)
- 16 November – Valborg Seeberg, writer (died 1929)
- 20 November – Gyda Gram, painter (died 1906)
- 25 November – Hans Andersen Foss, author, newspaper editor and temperance leader in America (died 1929)

=== Full date unknown ===
- Gunvald Aus, engineer (died 1950)
- Peter W. K. Bøckman, Sr., bishop and theologian (died 1926)
- Nicolai A. Grevstad, diplomat, politician and newspaper editor in America (died 1940)
- Knut Eriksson Helland, Hardanger fiddle maker (died 1880)
- Herman Jeremiassen, ship-owner and politician (died 1943)
- Carl Sofus Lumholtz, discoverer and ethnographer (died 1922)
- Olaj Olsen, jurist and politician (died 1920)
- August Geelmuyden Spørck, politician and Minister (died 1928)
- Oscar Sigvald Julius Strugstad, politician and Minister (died 1919)
- Aasmund Halvorsen Vinje, politician and Minister (died 1917)

== Deaths ==
- 5 July – Olaus Michael Schmidt, judge and politician (born 1784)

=== Full date unknown ===
- Palle Rømer Fleischer, politician and Minister (born 1781)
- Hilmar Meincke Krohg, politician (born 1776)
