= Henrik Bech =

18th century Danish-born wood carver

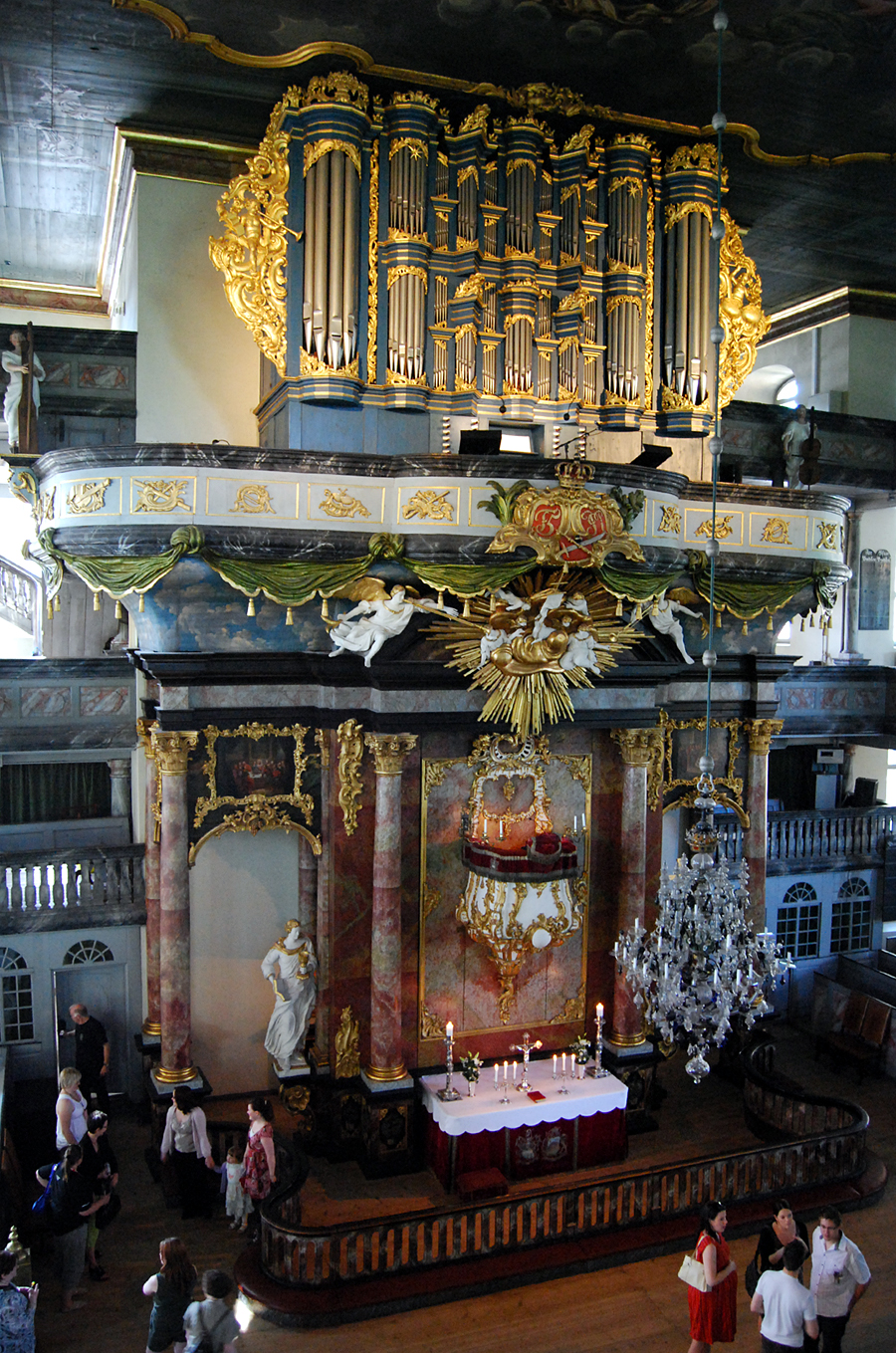
Interior from Kongsberg Church, partly sculptured by Bech.

Henrik Bech (c. 1718 – 1776) was a Danish-born wood carver who settled in Norway from around 1750. He was born in Copenhagen.

His first commission in Norway was to design oven plates for Moss Jernverk, and subsequently for several other ironworks. He also contributed to the decoration of churches, in particular Kongsberg Church, where he sculptured parts of the pulpit, altar, and the king's chair.
