= Gyldenpalm (noble family) =

- Nobility
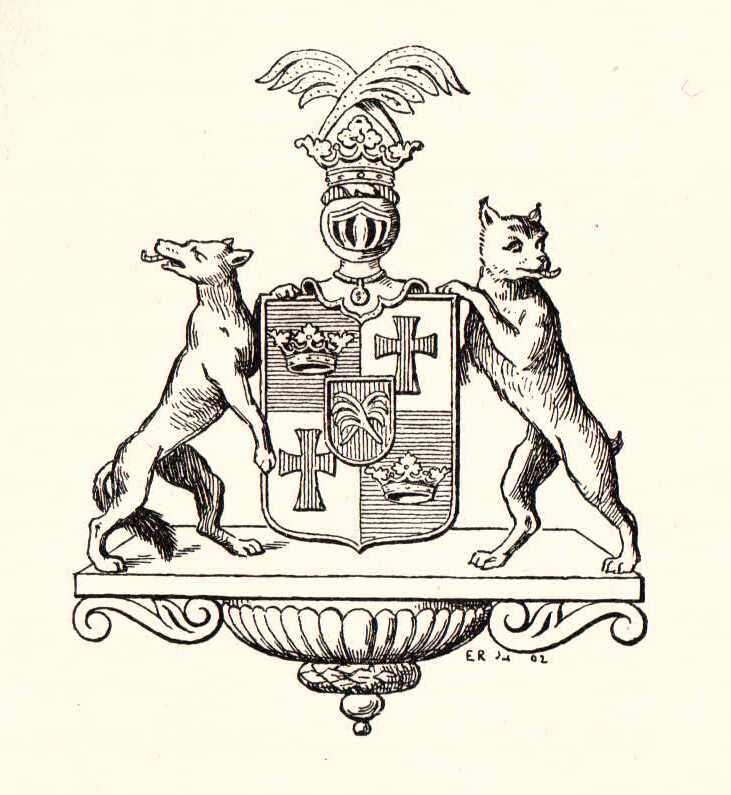
- Coat-of-arms approved for Hans Hagerup Gyldenpalm, 23 February 1781
- Country: Denmark; Norway
- Place of origin: Kalundborg
- Founded: 23 February 1781
- Founder: Hans Eilersen Hagerup
- Final head: Andreas Dedekam Hagerup Gyldenpalm
- Dissolution: 1832 (patrilineal)

The Gyldenpalm family was a Danish and Norwegian noble family.

== History ==
Hans Eilersen Hagerup was born 27 October 1717 in Kalundborg, Denmark and died 19 February 1781 at Kristiansand, Norway. He was the son of Eiler Hansen Hagerup (1685–1743) and Anna Catharina Barhow († 1737). His father was Bishop of the Diocese of Nidaros.

After a long career as an official, he became General Commissioner of War in Nordland in 1761. This automatically gave him personal noble status, belonging to the office nobility (Norwegian: embetsadel, rangadel). On the 23rd of February 1781, four days after his death, he was ennobled under the name Gyldenpalm (lit. Golden Palm). This made his children and grandchildren nobility.

His son Eiler Hagerup Gyldenpalm (1740–1817) became the first to use the surname Gyldenpalm. His grandson, Hans Hagerup Gyldenpalm (1774–1827) was a theologian and nobleman. The family became patrilineally extinct with the death of his grandson, diplomat Andreas Dedekam Hagerup Gyldenpalm (1777–1832).

== See also ==
- Danish nobility
- Norwegian nobility
