= Johan Ernst Mejdell =

Norwegian jurist and politician

Johan Ernst Mejdell (1773 - 5 November 1844) was a Norwegian jurist and politician.

He was elected to the Norwegian Parliament in 1818, representing the constituency of Christians Amt. He was later elected in 1824 from Fredriksstad. He worked as an attorney.
