= Anna Paaske =

Norwegian opera singer and teacher (1856–1935)

- Born: 26 September 1856; Sandsvær, Norway
- Died: 4 July 1935 (aged 78); Haugesund, Rogalund, Norway
- Other name: Anna Paaske von Gerthe-Axberg
- Occupations: Opera singer, music teacher

Anna Paaske (26 September 1856 – 4 July 1935) was a Norwegian opera singer and music teacher. She often performed in Wagner roles in concerts in Scandinavia and Northern Europe, and was especially popular in Germany. Her stage career ended after she injured her foot, from which she never fully recovered.

== Early life ==
Anna Paaske was born on 26 September 1856 in Sandsvær to mining engineer Carl Anthon Paaske and Caroline Louie Amalie Nielsen. She and her family moved to Karmøy after her father became the director of Viksnes mines. During an interview later in life, Paaske stated that her singing voice was a cradle gift. As a young girl she also studied with singer Thorvald Lammers.

== Career ==
She met Olefine Moe, who asked Paaske if she wanted to make her debut with Moe's opera company. Her debut took place on 20 April 1884 in Christiania, when she portrayed Gilda in the opera Rigoletto, after only having studied opera for half a year. She stayed in Södertälje in 1885 before making her debut on the lyrical stage in Stockholm, where she was engaged as a soloist at a concert by the King.

She made her Bergen debut at Den Nationale Scene in autumn 1888 as Betty in the operetta Schweitzerhytten. Paaske continued to be employed Den Nationale Scene until 31 October 1889 when she was released from her position, as they did not have the capacity to run an opera.

She had begun to make a name for herself with these roles, but it was only when she came to Germany that she reached new heights of stardom. Whilst there, she appeared as a guest on several opera stages, in popular works such as Lohengrin, Tannhäuser and Il Trovatore. Paaske also worked as a permanent employee at the Hoftheater in Lippe-Detmold, the Stadttheater in Kaiserslautern and in Lübeck. She achieved great success in Germany, but returned to Norway in 1905, intending to settle in Christiania.

From 1905 to 1914, Paaske was again living in Bergen, where she taught at the Bergens Musikkakademi. After one of her students performed a concert, Paaske slipped and damaged her foot, from which she never fully recovered, ending her stage career. From November 1915, she opened her own singing school in Haugesund. Paaske taught her students based directly on their speaking voice and believed that anyone could learn how to sing.

== Personal life and death ==
In 1913 in Bergen, she married Per Hugo Axberg and was sometimes known as Anna Paaske von Gerthen-Axberg.

Paaske died on 4 July 1935 in Haugesund, at the age of 78.
