= Hans Christian Hanssen-Fossnæs =

Norwegian farmer and politician

Hans Christian Hanssen-Fossnæs (9 October 1829 - 28 June 1890) was a Norwegian farmer and politician with the Conservative Party.

Hanssen-Fossnæs was born at Stokke in Vestfold, Norway. He grew up on the Kroken farm in Ske parish. He later acquired the Fossnes farm in Arnadal parish, which included a grain mill, sawmill and brickyard.

He was elected to the Norwegian Parliament in 1883, representing the constituency of Jarlsberg og Larviks amt (now Vestfold), serving one term.
