= Peder Tollefsen Ilsaas =

Norwegian farmer and politician

Peder Tollefsen Ilsaas (9 May 1777 – 17 February 1847) was a Norwegian farmer and politician.

He was born on the Ildsaas Nordre farm in the parish of Åmot in Hedmark county, Norway. He inherited the family farm from his father. He worked as a farmer and forest-owner.

He was elected to the Norwegian Parliament in 1815, representing the constituency of Hedemarkens Amt (now part of Innlandet). He served only one term.
