= Adolf Agthe =

Norwegian architect (1863–1941)

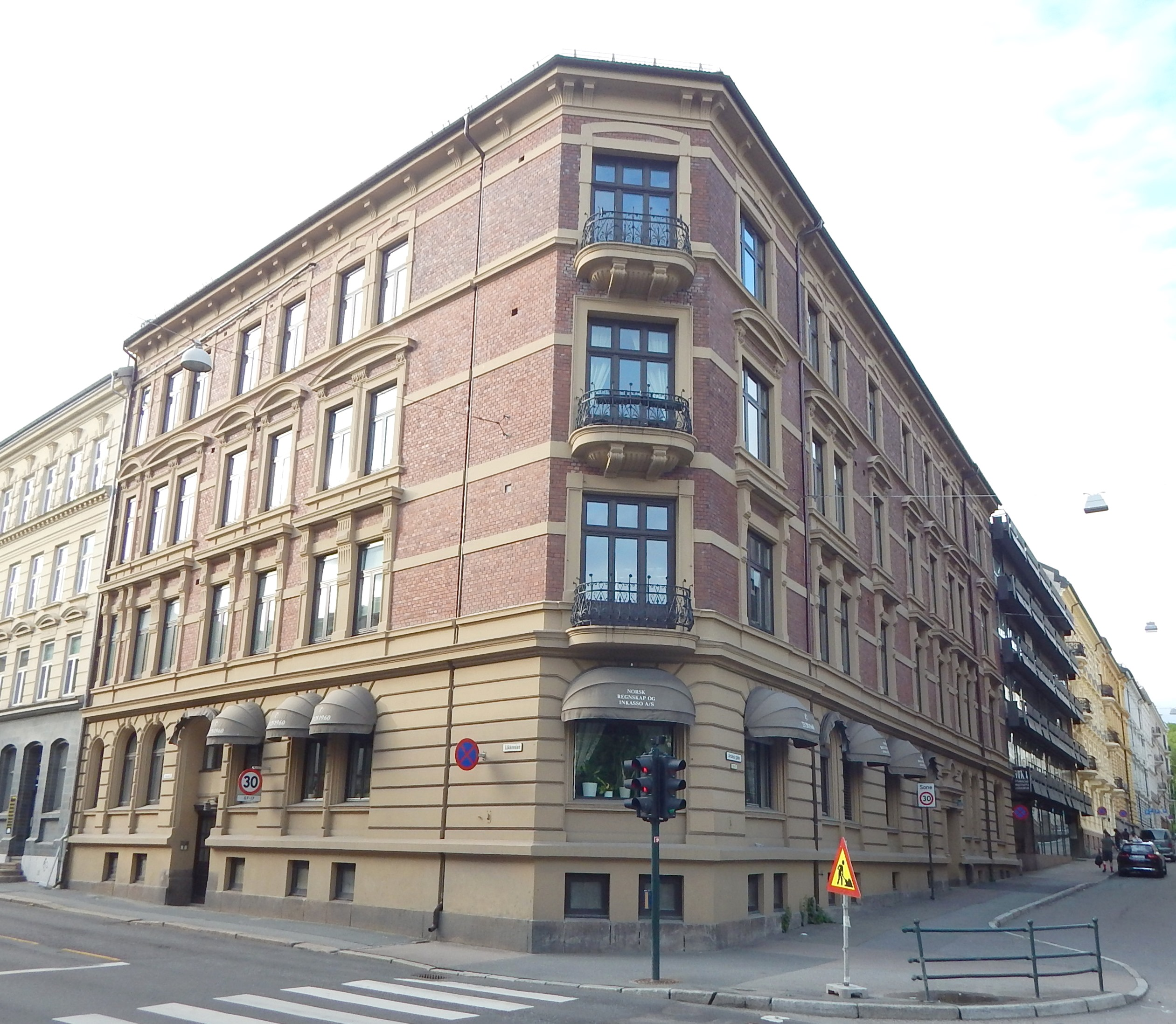
Arbins gate 13 (1894)

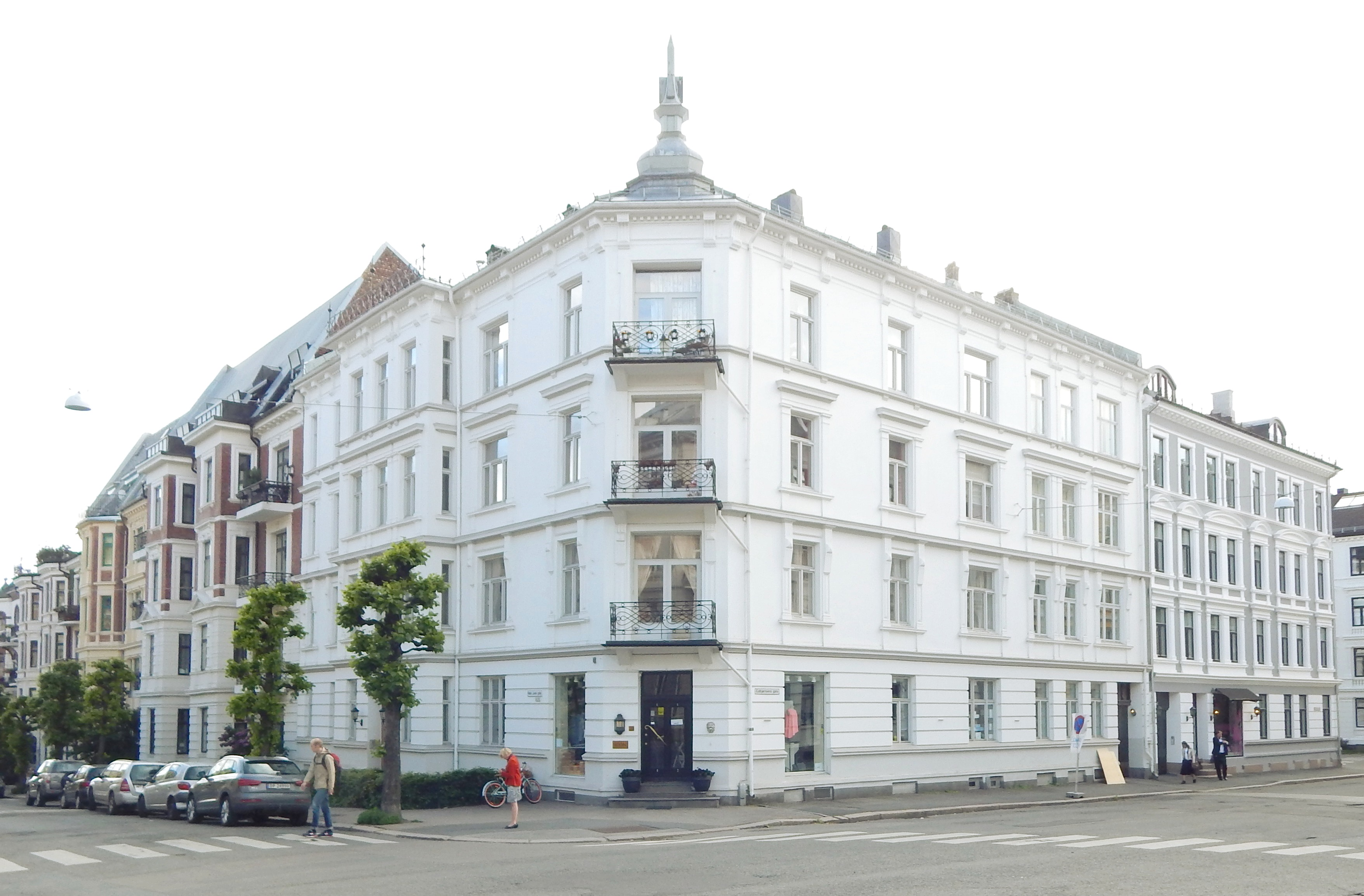
Niels Juels gate 50 (1896)

Adolf Wilhelm Wulf August Agthe (May 6, 1863 – January 31, 1941) was a Norwegian architect.

Adolf Agthe was born in Christiania (now Oslo), Norway. He was the son of Carl Agthe (1830–1899) and Wulfhilda Agthe (born 1839). His parents had immigrated to Norway from Prussia. He studied at Christiania Technical School (Christiania tekniske skole).

Adolf Agthe established an architectural office in Oslo in 1893. He designed a number of apartment building in Oslo. In 1900, he moved to Stockholm after the fire there. After 1900, he settled in Sandefjord in Vestfold county, Norway where he did a number of designs on various buildings.

== Notable works ==
- Herslebs gate 7 in the borough of Gamle Oslo in Oslo (1893)
- Arbins gate 13 in the Ruseløkka district of Oslo (1894)
- Niels Juels gate 50 in the Frogner district of Oslo (1896)
- Malmøgaten 1 in the Dælenenga district of Oslo (1898)
- Fællesslagteriet at Lørenveien 39 in Aker (1911)
