= Markus Nomil Iversen =

Norwegian shipowner and politician

Markus Nomil Iversen (born 1834, date of death unknown) was a Norwegian ship-owner and politician.

He was elected to the Parliament of Norway in 1877, representing the constituency of Sarpsborg. He worked as a timber merchant and ship-owner there. He served only one term.
