= Kathinka Kraft =

Norwegian memoirist (1826–1895)

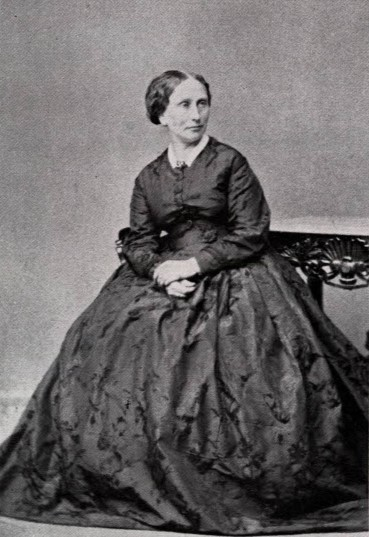
- Born: Kathinka Mørch; 12 October 1826; Christiania, Norway
- Died: 26 February 1895 (aged 68)
- Occupation: Memoirist
- Notable work: Et og andet fra min Tid. Erindringer
- Spouse: Isach Kraft (m. 1846)
- Children: 4

Kathinka Kraft (née Mørch; 12 October 1826 – 26 February 1895) was a Norwegian memoirist best known for her sole work Et og andet fra min Tid. Erindringer about her experiences growing up in Christiania and living in the countryside.

== Early life ==
Kathinka Mørch was born on 12 October 1826 in Christiania to Supreme Court assessor Claus Mørch (1801–1864) and Anna Lovise Meyer (1806–1876). She was one of six siblings. Her maternal side was a part of the merchant class in Christiania, while her father was descended from a Kristiansand patrician family. She received a comprehensive education and learned both Italian and French.

== Marriage and children ==
When she was 20, she married Isach Kraft, a diocesan Supreme Court protractor based in Christiania. Together, they had four children, three daughters and one son. After Isach Kraft became a magistrate in Orkdalen in 1868, the whole family moved there. Kraft and her daughters struggled to adjust to their new countryside home away from the capital and their circle of friends. Her son returned to Christiania for study, but her daughters remained in Orkdalen where they particularly struggled adjusting and two of them eventually died there in Orkdalen.

After her daughter read Conradine Birgitte Dunker's memoirs, she suggested to Kraft that she should write her own memoirs. She began work on her own in 1885, however it was never published during her lifetime. In her memoirs, she recounts her family history, childhood and life in Christiania and in the country.

== Death and legacy ==
Kraft died on 26 February 1895, at the age of 68. Her husband Isach died three years later in 1898. Kraft's memoirs eventually passed to her granddaughter, Astrid Kraft Veiersted and was published in 1938, with extra biographical details provided by Arthur Skjelderup.
