= Niels Thaaning =

Danish-born Norwegian painter

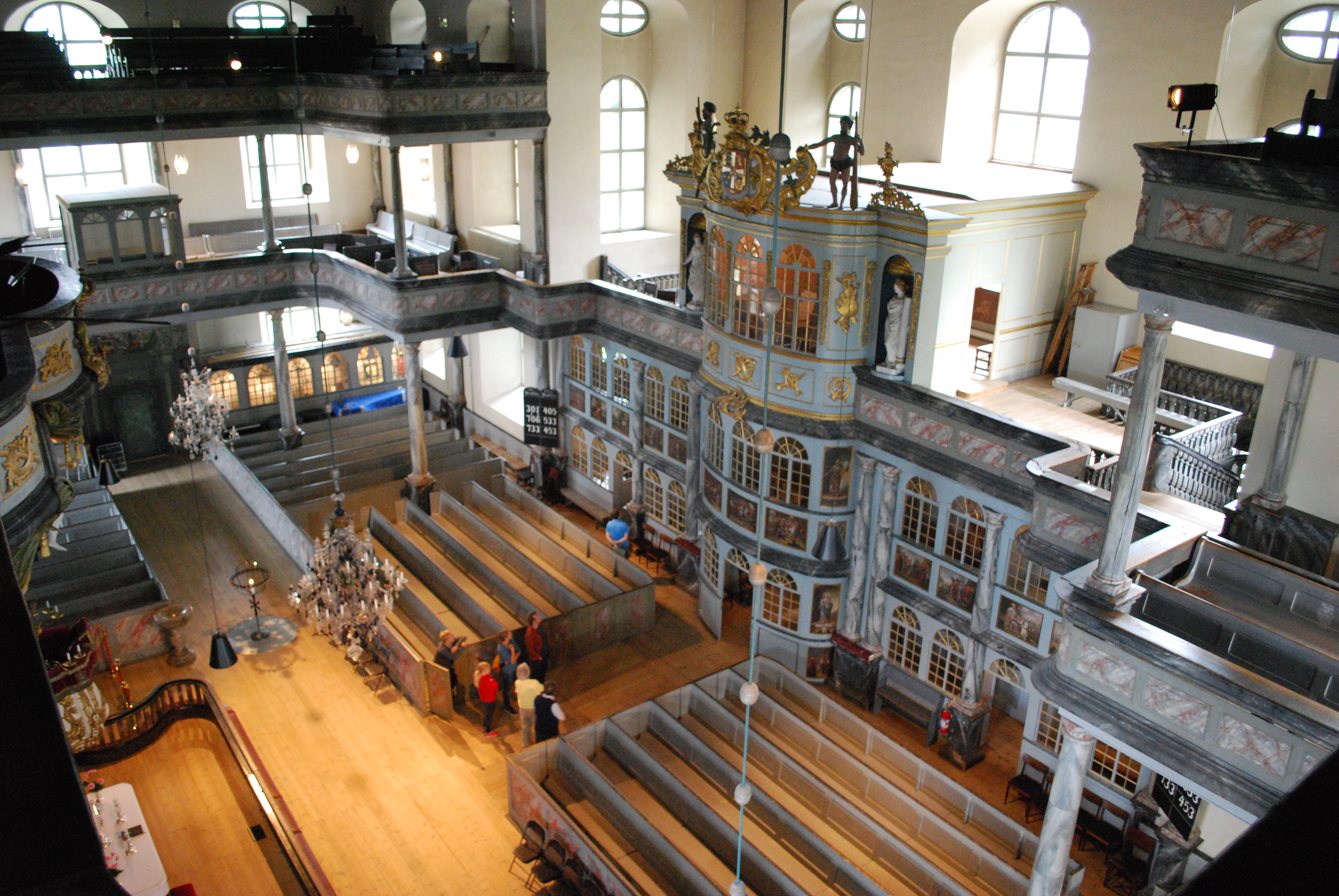
Roccoco interior of Kongsberg Church

Niels Thaaning (c. 1732—5 January 1779) was a Danish-born Norwegian painter.

He is best known for his decorations in Kongsberg Church (Kongsberg Kirke) from 1764 to 1766. He came as requested by the painter Johan Diderich von Dram ( 1725–1798), who had been commissioned to decorate the rococo interior of the church.

After two years in Kongsberg, Thaaning settled as an artist in Christiania (now Oslo) where he established a studio and workshop. His activities were diverse and varied including work as a decorator, ornament maker and portrait painter. A portrait signed by him is preserved at the Norwegian Museum of Cultural History. From 1772 to 1779 he served as teacher at the Norwegian Military Academy, where he was responsible for class in drawing. His last commission was probably decorations for the Akershus Fortress Church (Akershus slottskirke), part of the restoration of 1776.
