= Hans Jørgen Reutz Synnestvedt =

Norwegian military officer and politician

Hans Jørgen Reutz Synnestvedt (20 April 1777 – 12 June 1841) was a Norwegian military officer and politician.

He was an elected to the Norwegian Parliament in 1815, representing the constituency of Romsdals Amt. He was a captain in the army, and resided in the parish of Bolsøy near the town of Molde. He sat through only one term. Later, when local government was introduced in Norway, Synnestvedt served as the first mayor of Bolsøy Municipality, sitting from 1838 to 1840.

Of his three sons, two became military officers and one became a civil servant.
