= Johannes Christiansen =

Norwegian politician

Johannes Christiansen (17 October 1850 – 5 July 1913) was a Norwegian politician for the Liberal Party.

He was born in Askim, but moved to Skiptvet. He was deputy mayor from 1884 to 1887 and mayor from 1888 to 1889. He then quit local politics to become a police chief. Nonetheless, he chaired the local school board from 1896 to 1897 and was elected to the Norwegian Parliament in 1900, representing the constituency of Smaalenenes Amt. He only served one term.
