= Sophie Reimers =

Norwegian actress (1853–1932)

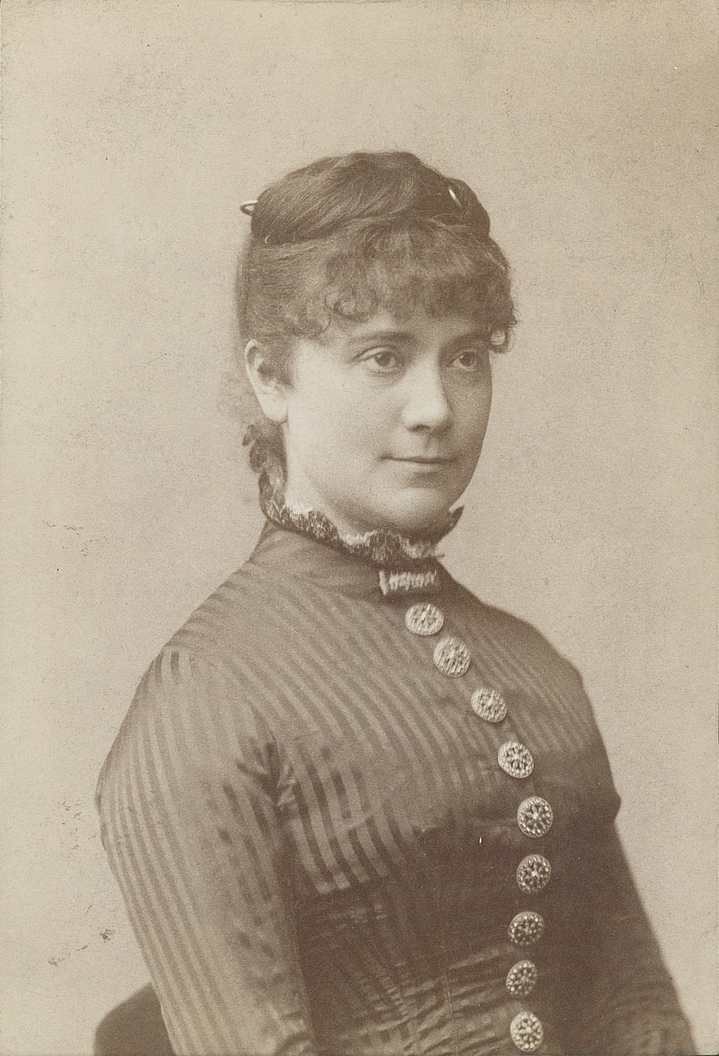
- Reimers in 1884
- Born: 19 April 1853; Bergen, Norway
- Died: 9 April 1932 (aged 78); Oslo
- Occupation: Actress

Sofie Reimers (19 April 1853 – 9 April 1932) was a Norwegian stage actress. She was recognized for her performances in both major tragedies and comedies.

== Biography ==
Petra Sophie Alette Christine Reimers was born in Bergen, the daughter of Claus Severin Frimann Reimers (1808–70) and Severine Cathrine Lem (1816–96). She made her stage debut as Svanhild in Kjærlighedens Komedie by Henrik Ibsen at Den Nationale Scene on October 31, 1879. She later performed at Christiania Theatre from 1881 and at Nationaltheatret from 1899 until her death, being the theatre's "Grand Old Lady". She continued her legacy from the 19th century during her last performance at the Nationaltheatret on March 10, 1932, where she played Klara Song in Over Ævne I by Bjørnstjerne Bjørnson. She published her memoir Teaterminder fra Kristiania Teater in 1919 and died in Oslo during 1932.
