= Lorenz Juhl Vogt =

Norwegian politician

Lorenz Juhl Vogt (28 April 1825 – 3 July 1901) was a Norwegian politician.

He was elected to the Norwegian Parliament in 1874 and 1877, representing the constituency of Fredrikshald, where he worked as a customs surveyor.
