= Carl Johan Severin Steen =

Norwegian politician

Carl Johan Severin Steen (1825–1874) was a Norwegian politician.

He was born in Lom Municipality on 12 October 1825. He eventually settled in Førde Municipality in the 1850s. He was also a jurist and county auditor. He was elected mayor of Førde Municipality from 1870-1873. He was elected to the Parliament of Norway in 1874 and met in Parliament until the 18th of April when he was given sick leave. He died on 15 June 1874.
