= Herman Garmann =

Norwegian businessman and merchant

Herman Garmann (27 March 1787 – 23 June 1853) was a Norwegian businessman and merchant.

== Biography ==
Herman Christopher Garmann was born at Alstahaug on the southern tip of the island of Alsten in Nordland county, Norway. He was the son of Christopher Garmann (1747–1800) and Maren Elisabeth Schanke (1753–1817). Garmann grew up in the rectory of Alstahaug Church where his father was the vicar. In 1811, he settled in Trondheim where he joined the firm H. Hoë & Company, the trading company founded by his father-in-law, Herman Hoë (1751–1837).

H. Hoe & Company was one of the most powerful trading houses in Trondheim through the decades from the end of the 1700s until the mid-1800s. The firm operated a fleet of ships and was based on the trade of fish, grain, glass, lumber and copper. His business interests also included a metal foundry, mechanical workshop and a large mill. Besides his commercial interests, Garmann was the French vice-consul in Trondheim from 1820, and Russian vice-consul from 1821. He was also politically engaged was a citizen representative in Trondheim (1817–1829) and he was chosen as an alternate to the Norwegian Parliament in 1836, 1839 and 1842. In 1813, he was among the founding members of Klubselskabet Philharmonic, where he was presiding officer (1835–36). He was also co-founder of Trondhjems Sparebank (now SpareBank 1 SMN) in 1823 and director from 1823 to 1825 and from 1834 to 1836.

== Personal life ==
He was married to Nicoline Catharine Hoë (1791–1850). Their daughter, Marie Garmann (born c. 1815) was married to Arild Christopher Huitfeld (1813–1877).
