= Peder Klykken =

Norwegian judge and politician

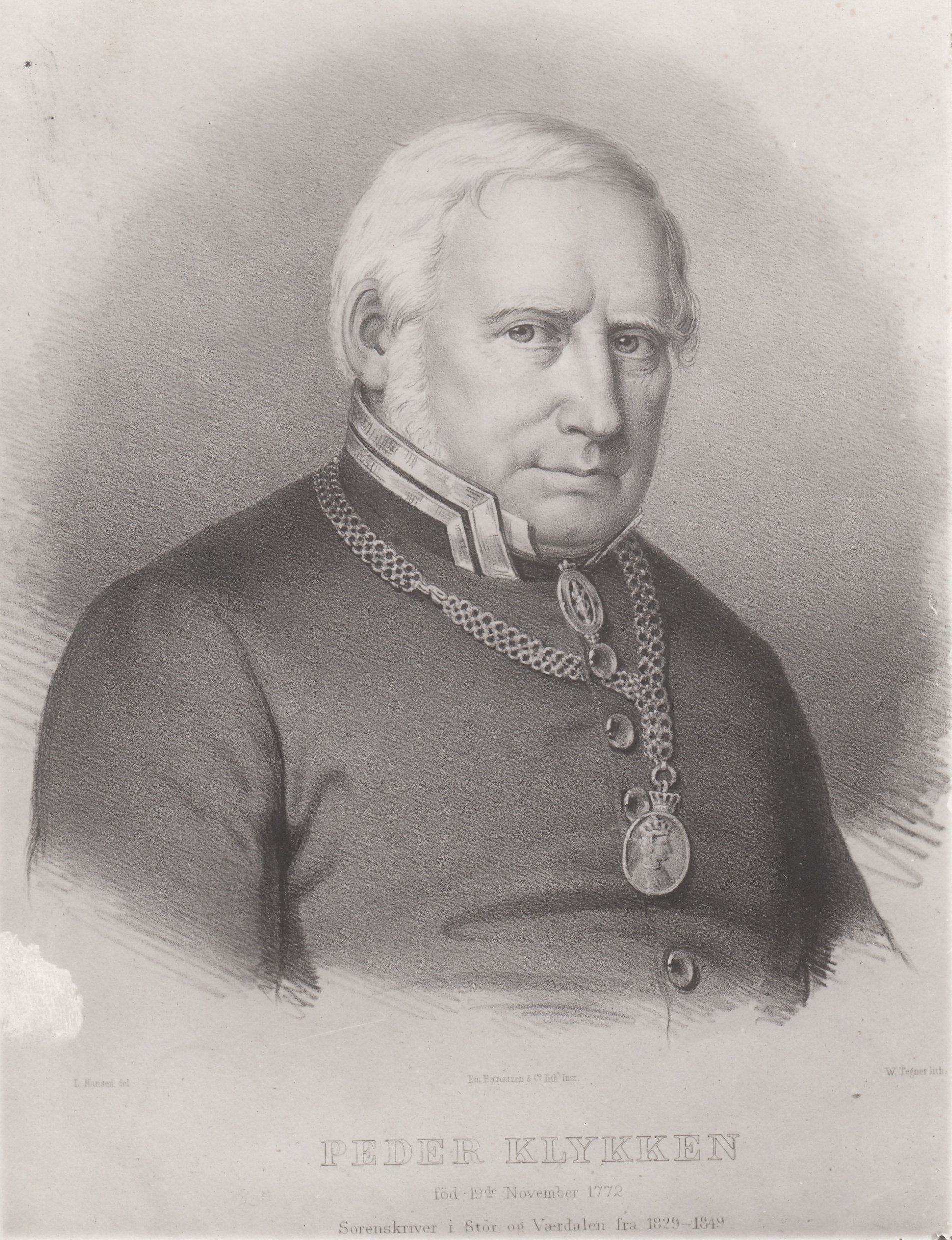
Peder Klykken

Peder Klykken (29 November 1772 – 22 January 1861) was a Norwegian judge and politician.

Klykken was born in the Overhalla prestegjeld in Nordre Trondheim, Norway. He served as sheriff at Overhalla from 1795 to 1797. He attended the University of Copenhagen where he received a law degree in 1802. He was appointed district stipendiary magistrate (sorenskriver) in Lofoten in May 1809. While stationed there, he was elected to the Norwegian Parliament in 1818, representing the rural constituency Nordlands Amt.

By 1819 he had left Lofoten. He instead became district stipendiary magistrate in Størdalen og Værdalen (today part of Stjørdal Municipality and Verdal Municipality). He served as a deputy representative to the Norwegian Parliament during the term 1821–1823, and was elected one final time in 1827, both times representing the rural constituency of Nordre Throndhjems Amt (now Nord-Trøndelag).
