= Jørgen Young =

Norwegian politician (1781–1837)

Jørgen Young (baptized April 17, 1781 – died February 26, 1837) was a Norwegian timber merchant born in Vinger. Youngstorget (Young's Square) in Oslo is named after him.

Young had his own dwelling in the building that now stands at Storgata no. 3 in Christiania. He purchased the Enerhaugen neighborhood in 1815 and parceled out the properties there in order to drive out the most well-off cottagers, whereby in return for leasing land there the people and their families had to provide unpaid labor, among other duties.

Young sat on the city council from 1816 to 1821. At that time, the wealthiest men in the city could determine whether and how long they wanted to sit in the city council. He represented the capital in the Parliament of Norway for the 1821 term.

Young was also one of the city's fire commissioners, for which he received a small fee from the city budget. In 1818 he purchased the property later known as Youngsløkken from the court justice Paul Thrane. Young was the wealthiest man in the city from 1833 to 1834.
