= Teis Lundegaard =

Norwegian politician (1774–1856)

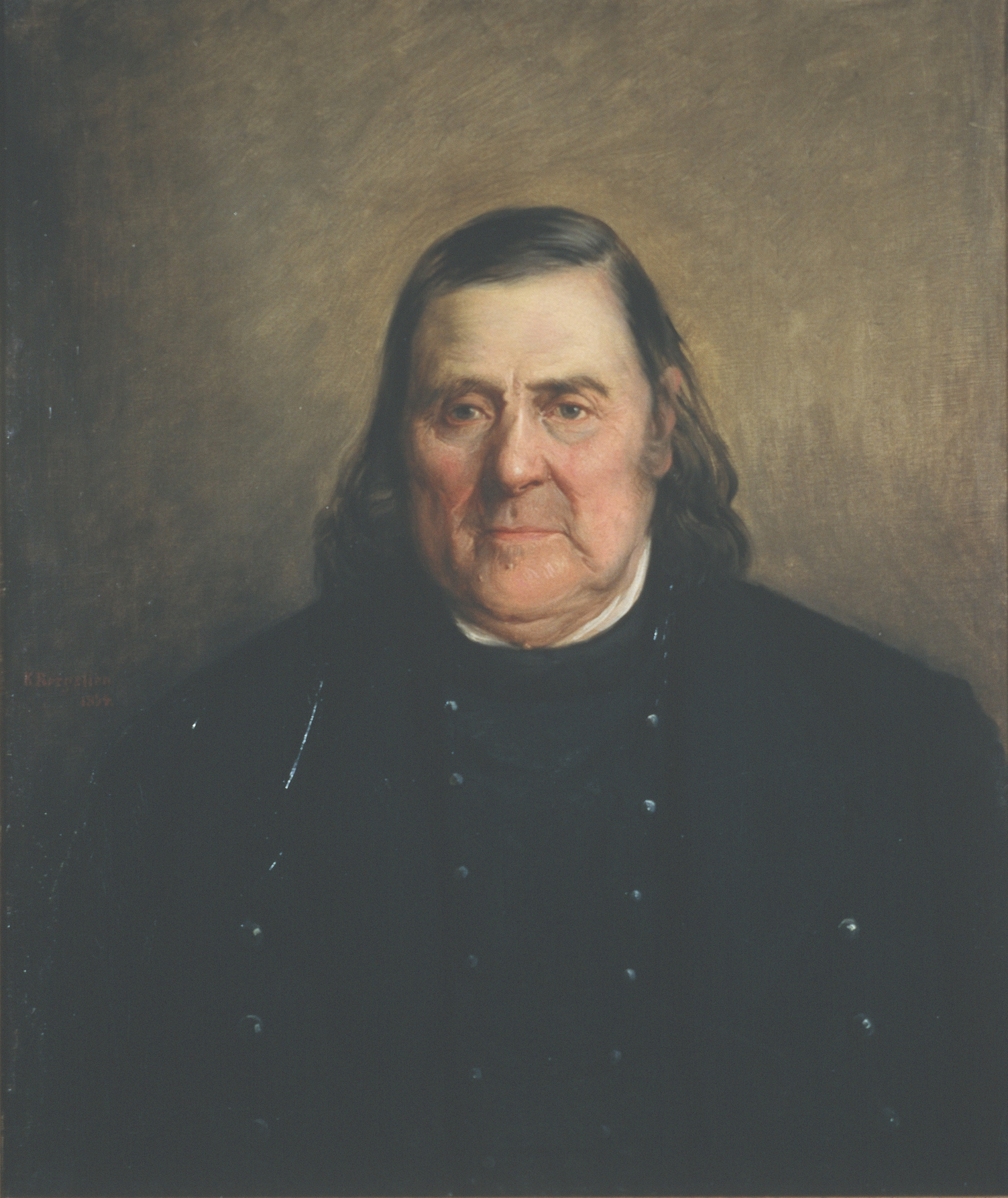
Theis Jacob Thorkildsen Lundegaard painted by Knud Bergslien.

Theis Jacob Thorkildsen Lundegaard (8 October 1774 – 26 February 1856) was a Norwegian farmer, shipowner and politician. He represented Lister amt (now Vest-Agder) at the Norwegian Constituent Assembly in 1814. He was elected to the Parliament of Norway from 1815 to 1816, from 1821 to 1822, from 1827 to 1833, and in 1845.

== Background ==
Teis Lundegaard was the son of a peasant farmer in the parish of Austad in Vest-Agder who died when Teis was three years old. He grew up in conditions of poverty. He eventually started trading and soon became the skipper and owner of several coastal freighters. Having become prosperous, he invested in the land and settled in Austad as a well-to-do farmer, becoming a leading man in the community. He was a remarkable man, known for his mental ability as well as his physical strength.

== Political career ==
Teis Lundegaard played a prominent part in a crucial period of Norwegian history. In the confusion of international affairs at the end of the Napoleonic wars, the Norwegians rejected the peace treaty of Kiel in 1814, by which Norway was ceded to Sweden after having been in union with Denmark since 1380. They claimed their independence and set out to form their own constitution. Teis Lundegaard was elected representative for Lister Amt (now Vest-Agder) to the Constitutional Assembly which met at Eidsvoll. As a signatory of the constitutional document of 17 May 1814, his name is linked to the Norwegian Constitutional Day celebration.

Between 1814-1845 Teis Lundegaard was re-elected several times to the National Assembly. With his great self-assurance and common sense, he became one of the leading spokesmen for the farmers in the parliament at a time when this social group lacked in political experience and self-confidence. In one parliamentary session alone, he sat on as many as 18 committees.

Many stories are told about his wit and humor, as well as his fearlessness and stubbornness, which made him a feared and respected political opponent. He frequently quoted the Bible, which he was said to know by heart. He was also known for using coarse words, especially in confrontation with government officials and the clergy, who at that time were the most influential political groups. On the other hand stories are also told about his concern for and help to people in distress." One story concerns a meeting at Eidsvoll (a country venue) in 1814, at which the Norwegian constitution was being drafted. The city politicians dominated the proceedings, and apparently annoyed Teis. On a trip out to the out-house toilets, which were reached by planks placed on the muddy earth, he met a city politician on the boards. Instead of giving way, he lifted the city man by the chest, and either swung him round, past him on the plank (or possibly 'dumped' him in the mud), with a comment to the effect of: "this is how we deal with city folk here".

== Personal life ==
Lundegaard married Sara Jacobsdtr (Dec 1779 - May 1872). They had 10 children in the marriage; 2 died as children.

- Bertha Serine Teisdtr (Sept 27, 1801 - Mar 29, 1880)
- Torkel Lundegaard (Dec 2, 1803 - Apr 11, 1877)
- Jacob Lundegaard (Mar 9, 1806 - July 6, 1806)
- Jacob Lundegaard (May 7, 1807 - June 10, 1827)
- Theis Stuland (Feb 19, 1810 - Feb 3, 1902)
- Nils Tobias Lundegaard (Nov 8, 1812 - July 28, 1867)
- Ingeborg Teisdtr (Sept 6, 1815 - 1875)
- Enok Lundegaard (June 18, 1818 - Feb 15, 1820)
- Enok Lundegaard (Mar 3, 1821 - Oct 20, 1911)
- Anne Marie Teisdtr (Dec 16, 1823 - Nov 4, 1913)
