= Laurents Hallager =

Norwegian physician and lexicographer

Laurents Hallager (12 November 1777 – 2 February 1825) was a Norwegian medical doctor and lexicographer.

== Life ==
Hallager had a Danish background but he grew up in Bergen.

He studied in Copenhagen and received his medical degree in 1804. As a student, he compiled a glossary of approximately 6,000 Norwegian words and expressions, titled Norsk Ordsamling (Norwegian Vocabulary). Today, this is considered the first Norwegian dialect dictionary.

Hallager later worked as a doctor in Bergen.
