= Magdalene Osenbroch =

Norwegian actress (1830–1854)

- Born: Lene Henrikke Dedichen Osenbroch; 23 February 1830; Bergen, Vestland, Norway
- Died: 11 February 1854 (aged 23); Bergen, Vestland, Norway
- Other names: Magdalene Houge
- Occupation: Actress
- Years active: 1851–1854
- Spouse: Peter Andreas Houge (m. 1853)
- Children: 1

Magdalene Henrikke Dedichen Osenbroch (23 February 1830 – 11 February 1854) was a Norwegian actress who mainly performed at the Det norske Theater in Bergen.

== Early life ==
Magdalene Henrikke Dedichen Osenbroch (baptised Lene) was born on 23 February 1830 in Bergen, and was the daughter of merchant Anthon Magnus Osenbroch and his second wife Margrethe Cathrine Tornøe.

== Career ==
Osenbroch made her debut on 12 January 1851, as a guest performer at the Det norske Theater in her hometown of Bergen, playing the role of Jenny in En hytte og hans Hjerte. Two months later in March 1851, she made her Christiania debut in the same role at the Christiania Theatre. However her performance was not well-received in the capital, although she was defended by playwright Henrik Ibsen. Osenbroch did not secure an engagement in Christiania, so she returned to Bergen, where she was hired by Ole Bull at the Det Norske Teatret. She was employed there for the autumn season of 1851, from 26 September to 30 November and afterwards was engaged as a student there. Whilst she was a student, she performed in various roles in 1852 including Julie in En Mand paa Kast, a fruit merchant in Charlotte Cordan, Amalie in Familie Kjaerlighed, Toilet in Den Skinsyge Kone, and Emmeline North in Tonietta. She left the theatre on 31 March 2025.

== Marriage and death ==
On 3 April 1853, Osenbroch married the merchant Peter Andreas Houge in Bergen, and together they had one daughter. Osenbroch died on 11 February 1854 in Bergen, at the age of 24, only eleven months after her marriage.
