= Christian Garup Meidell =

Norwegian military officer and politician

Christian Garup Meidell (30 January 1780 – 19 March 1863) was a Norwegian military officer and politician.

He was born in Balestrand as the son of Jacob Gerhard Meidell (1735–1796) and his wife Birgitte Munthe Finde (1754–1789). He married Marie Helene Hille (1799–1871) from Lærdal, and they had ten children.

He took his education in Copenhagen, and embarked on a military career. He eventually became lieutenant colonel, serving from 1839 to 1854.

He was elected to the Norwegian Parliament in 1827, representing the constituency of Nordre Bergenhus Amt. He served only one term. He had served as a deputy representative in 1824. He was also the first mayor of Leikanger Municipality, serving in 1838 and 1839.
