= Jonas Collett =

Danish-Norwegian public official, legislator, and statesman

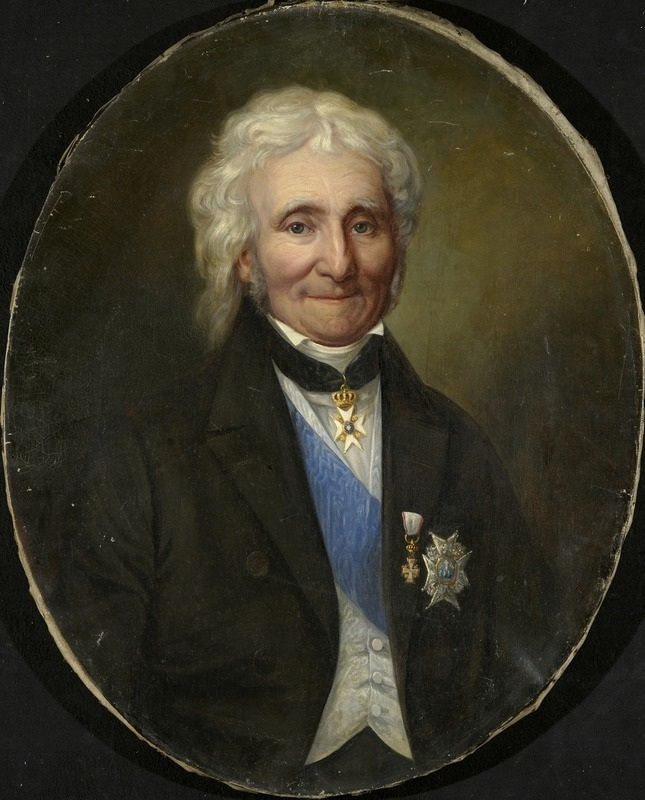
- 19th century portrait of Jonas Collett

First Minister of Norway
- In office 1 July 1822 – 19 September 1836
- Monarch: Charles III John
- Succeeded by: Nicolai Krog

Minister of Education and Church Affairs
- In office 15 October 1819 – 15 September 1820
- Prime Minister: Peder Anker
- Preceded by: Niels Treschow
- Succeeded by: Niels Treschow

Minister of Finance
- In office 1 January 1822 – 17 December 1836
- Prime Minister: Mathias Sommerhielm; Severin Løvenskiold
- Preceded by: Herman W. Jarlsberg
- Succeeded by: Jørgen Herman Vogt
- In office 15 October 1818 – 30 November 1818
- Prime Minister: Peder Anker
- Preceded by: Herman W. Jarlsberg
- Succeeded by: Herman W. Jarlsberg

Minister of the Army
- In office 15 May 1819 – 15 October 1819
- Prime Minister: Peder Anker
- Preceded by: Mathias Sommerhielm (Chief of the 6th Ministry)
- Succeeded by: Nicolai Krog

Personal details
- Born: 25 March 1772 Næstved, Denmark
- Died: 3 January 1851 (aged 78) Christiania, United Kingdoms of Sweden and Norway
- Spouse: Maren Christine Collett

Jonas Collett (25 March 1772 – 3 January 1851) was a Danish-Norwegian public official, legislator, and statesman. Born on the Rønnebæksholm estate at Næstved in Denmark, he remained in Norway after the termination of the personal union with Denmark in 1814. He was the First minister of Norway (1822-1836).

== Background ==
Collett was born at the family manor house Rønnebæksholm (Rønnebæksholm Gods) in Næstved, Denmark. He was the son of Johan Collett (1734-1806) and Maureen Elisabeth Jensen (1746-1788). He was educated at the University of Copenhagen and graduated in 1791. Educated in the law, he soon entered public service. In 1795, he was appointed Bailiff in Numedal and later Kongsberg year. He replaced Herman Wedel Jarlsberg as acting County Governor of Buskerud in 1813 and was succeeded by his brother Johan Collett in 1814.

== Political career ==
Collett was a Member of Norwegian Parliament in 1814, 1818, 1824 and 1827. He played an important role in the events of Norway in 1814 and became known as one of the "Eidsvoll men". Together with Niels Aall, he led the negotiations with Swedish general Magnus Björnstjerna which resulted in the Convention of Moss. Later, he participated in several government positions. He was a prominent minister and received the post of First minister when the former First minister Mathias Sommerhielm left Christiania in 1822. His position made him the most prominent minister, although with political power than that of the Governor of Norway. When governor Baltzar von Platen died in 1829, no new governor was appointed, and Collett subsequently became the highest authority in Norway until he left office in 1836, except for a brief period in 1833 when Crown Prince Oscar was appointed viceroy.

== Personal life ==
He was married in 1797 to Maren Christine Collett (1777-1860), daughter of landowner Peter Collett (1740-1786) and his second wife Johanne Henriche Ancher (1750-1812). He died in Christiania (now Oslo) and was buried at Vår Frelsers gravlund.
