= 1924 in Norway =

- Centuries: 18th; 19th; 20th; 21st
- Decades: 1900s; 1910s; 1920s; 1930s; 1940s
- See also: List of years in Norway

Events in the year 1924 in Norway.

== Incumbents ==
- Monarch – Haakon VII.

== Events ==
- The 1924 Parliamentary election takes place.
- Kringkastningselskapet A/S was founded. This was the predecessor to the Norwegian Broadcasting Corporation, established in 1933
- Geitungen Lighthouse is established.
- Munck Cranes company is founded.
- Ny Tid begins publishing.
- Salhus Church is completed.

== Notable births ==
=== January ===
- 5 January – Ottar Dahl, historian and historiographer (died 2011)
- 17 January – Bjørn Gundersen, high jumper (died 2002)
- 18 January – Gudrun Tandberg Høykoll, politician (died 2005)
- 24 January – Gunnar Thorleif Hvashovd, politician (died 2001)
- 21 January – Arne Nilsen, politician and minister (died 2020)
- 27 January – Knut Hoem, politician and minister (died 1987)

=== February ===
- 3 February – Ivar Ramstad, discus thrower (died 2009)
- 3 February – Johan Syrstad, politician (died 2019)
- 5 February – Viktor Olsen, marathon runner (died 2023)
- 5 February – Thor Støre, politician (died 2001)
- 9 February – Andreas Hagen, newspaper editor (died 2011)
- 13 February – Arne Tjersland, politician (died 2015)
- 16 February – Haaken Christensen, art historian, art collector and gallerist (died 2008).
- 19 February – Arnljot Høyland, mathematical statistician (died 2002).
- 19 February – Borghild Niskin, alpine skier (died 2013)
- 23 February – Per G. Schøyen, diplomat (died 2017)
- 28 February – Oddvar Vormeland, educationalist and civil servant (died 2013)

=== March ===
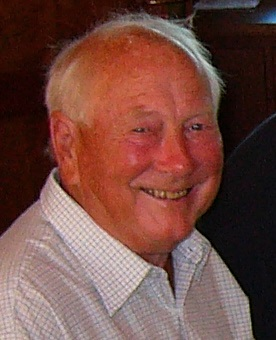
Bjørn G. Andersen

- 2 March – Arne Sandnes, politician (died 2016)
- 5 March – Johan Østby, politician (died 2005)
- 11 March – Sverre Oddvar Andresen, politician (died 1994)
- 23 March – Bjørn G. Andersen, geologist and academic (died 2012)
- 30 March – Reidar Berg, bobsledder (died 2018)

=== April ===
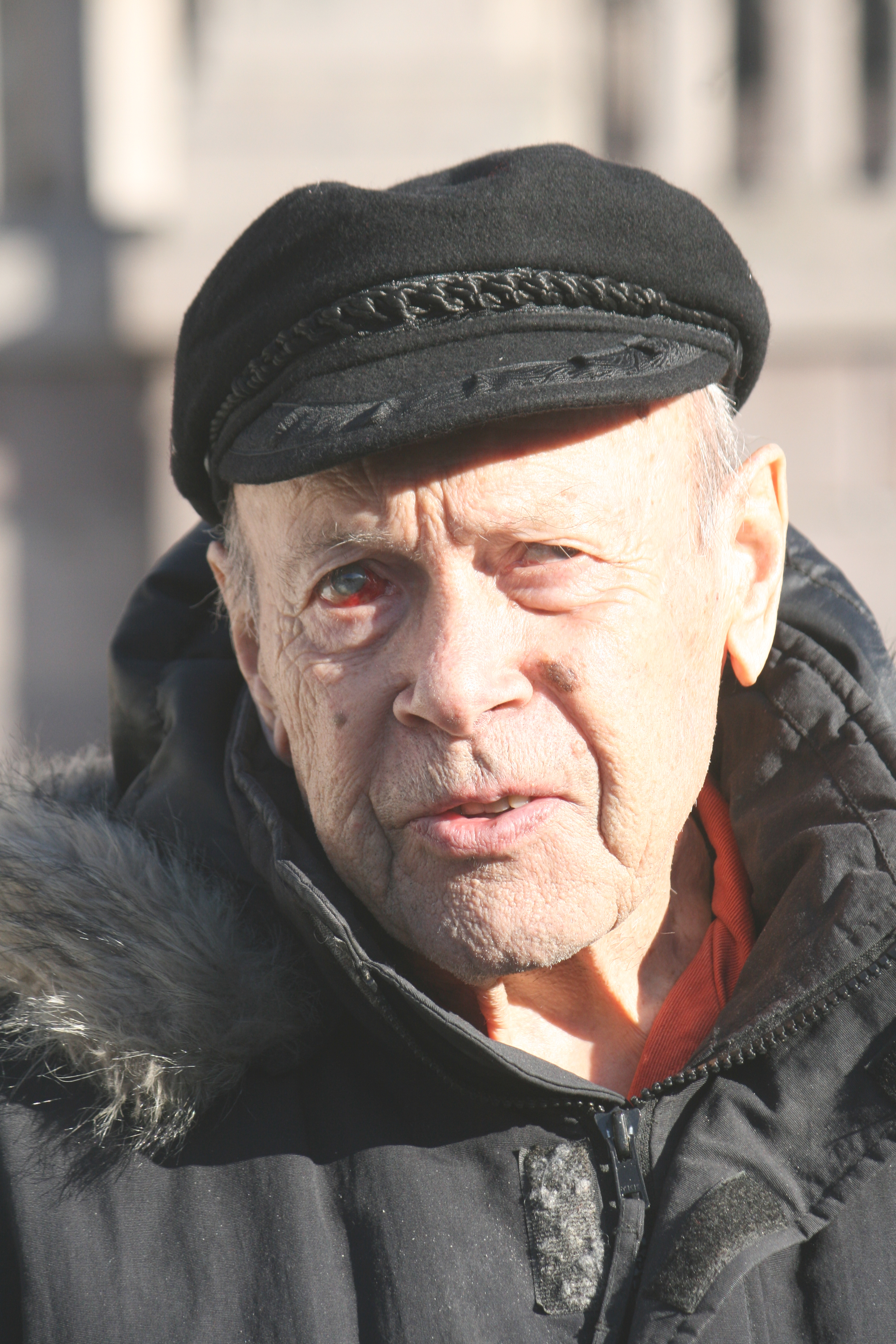
Gunnar Garbo

- 7 April – Espen Skjønberg, actor (died 2022)
- 10 April – Erik Himle, civil servant, politician and Minister (died 2008)
- 19 April
  - Mary Eide, politician (died 2013)
  - Gunnar Garbo, journalist, politician and ambassador (died 2016).
- 20 April – Sverre Johan Juvik, politician (died 2015)
- 22 April – Thorbjørn Svenssen, international soccer player (died 2011)
- 26 April – Finn Isaksen, politician and Minister (died 1987)

=== May ===
- 10 May – Anders Hveem, bobsledder (died 2005)
- 11 May – Lars Ketil Strand, forester and professor (died 2020)
- 13 May – Trond Johansen, intelligence officer.
- 20 May – Odd Abrahamsen, poet (died 2001)
- 23 May – Ragnar Halvorsen, businessperson (died 2019)

=== June ===
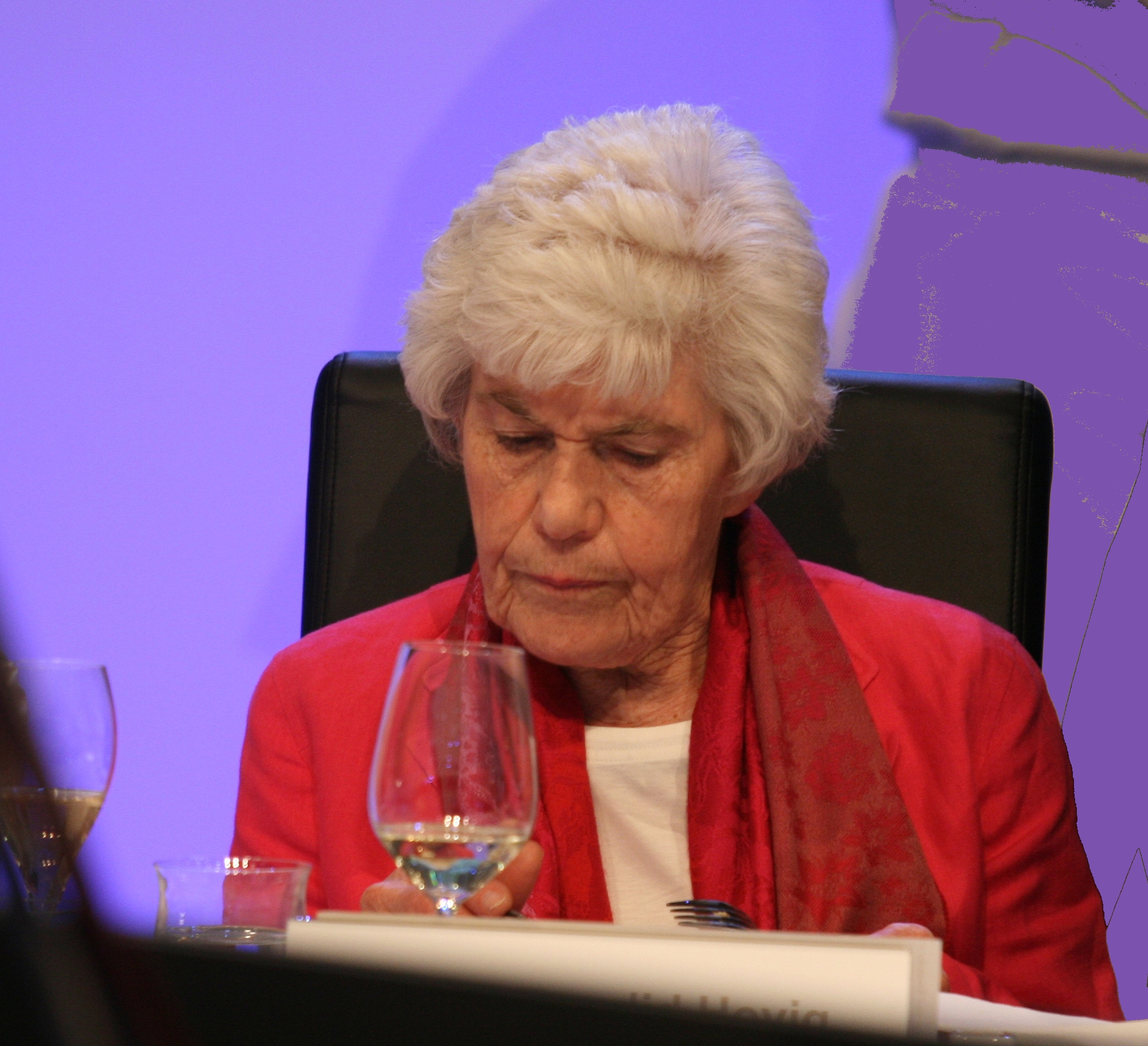
Ingrid Espelid Hovig

- 1 June – Willy Ovesen, civil servant (died 2015)
- 3 June – Ingrid Espelid Hovig, television chef and cookery writer (died 2018)
- 8 June – Gunnar Brøvig, politician (died 1965)
- 8 June – Dagfinn Vårvik, politician and Minister (died 2018)
- 26 June – Birger Leirud, high jumper (died 1999)
- 30 June – Mattis Mathiesen, photographer and film director (died 2010)

=== July ===
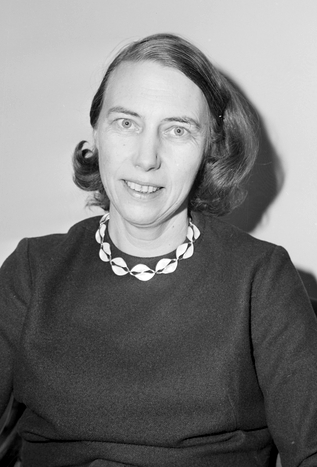
Signe Marie Stray Ryssdal

- 4 July – Julius Paltiel, Holocaust survivor (died 2008)
- 11 July – Eleonore Bjartveit, politician and Minister (died 2002)
- 11 July – Ragnar Rommetveit, psychologist (died 2017).
- 15 July – Lars Aspeflaten, politician (died 2010)
- 15 July – Finn Bjørnseth, writer (died 1973).
- 22 July – Signe Marie Stray Ryssdal, politician and Supreme Court lawyer (died 2019)

=== August ===
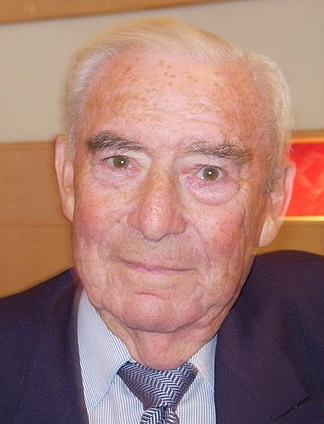
Jo Benkow

- 14 August
  - Sverre Fehn, architect (died 2009)
  - Bernt H. Lund, civil servant, diplomat and politician (died 2026).
- 15 August –
  - Jo Benkow, politician and writer and President of the Parliament (died 2013)
  - Anton Blom, journalist (died 2012).
- 19 August – Karl Egil Aubert, mathematician (died 1990)
- 23 August – Edvard Fliflet Bræin, composer and conductor (died 1976).
- 25 August – Ingvald Ulveseth, politician (died 2008)
- 31 August – Thor Pedersen, rower and Olympic bronze medallist (died 2008)

=== September ===
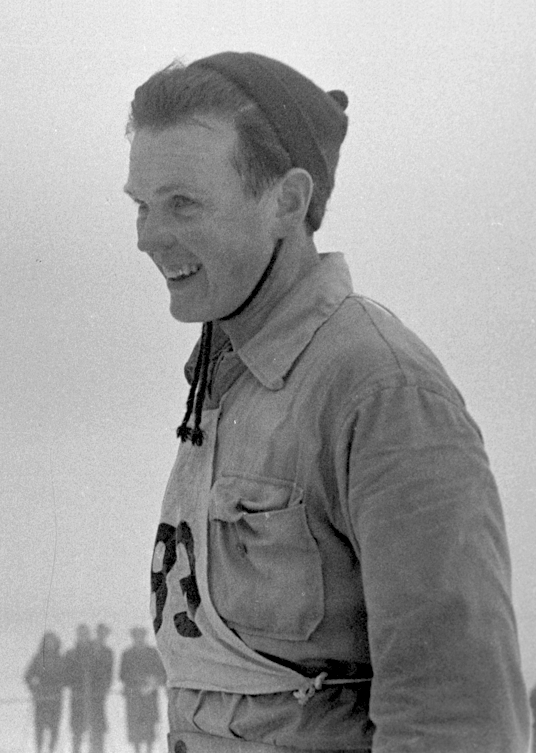
Magnar Estenstad

- 1 September – Christian Fredrik Borchgrevink, physician (died 2024)
- 2 September – Egil Bergsland, politician (died 2007)
- 18 September – Sverre Helland, politician (died 2007)
- 27 September – Magnar Estenstad, cross country skier and double Olympic medallist (died 2004)
- 27 September – Kolbjørn Stordrange, politician (died 2004)

=== October ===
- 3 October – Nils Retterstøl, professor of psychiatry (died 2008)
- 18 October – Egil Hovland, composer (died 2013)
- 18 October – Bjørn Larsson, sport wrestler (died 2021).

=== November ===
- 19 November – Knut Steen, sculptor (died 2011)
- 22 November – Grete Nordrå, actress (died 2012).

=== December ===
- 5 December – Enok Palm, mathematician (died 2012).
- 8 December – Hans Haga, agrarian leader (died 2008)
- 21 December – Tove Pihl, educator and politician (died 1987)

== Notable deaths ==
=== January to March ===
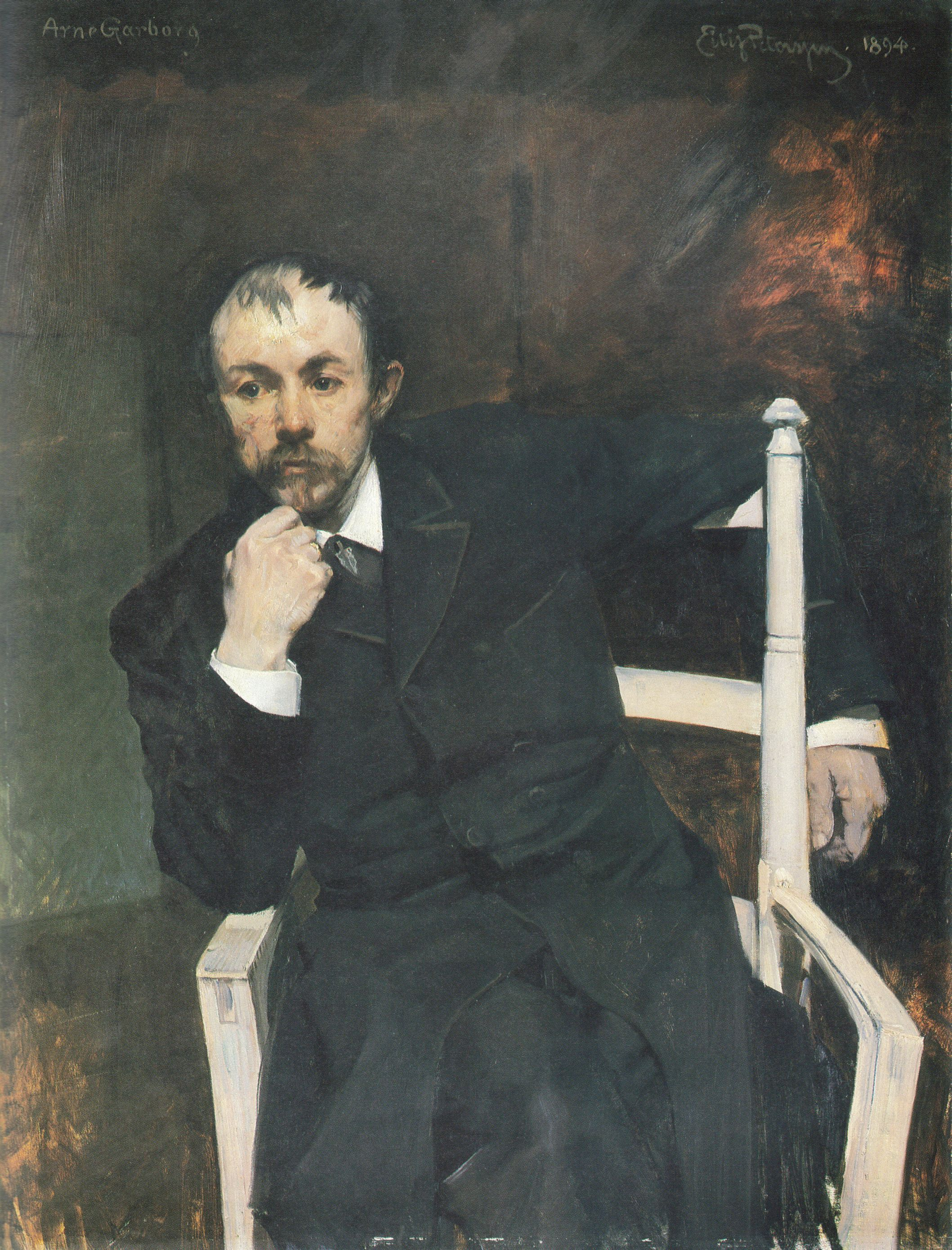
Arne Garborg painted by Eilif Peterssen

- 1 January – Karen Sundt, writer (born 1841).
- 14 January – Arne Garborg, writer (born 1851)
- 19 January – Christian Skredsvig, painter and writer (born 1854)
- 3 February – Axel Christian Zetlitz Kielland, civil servant and diplomat (born 1853)
- 4 February – Nordal Wille, botanist (born 1858)
- 9 February – Nils Kjær, writer (born 1870).
- 11 February – Olav Nygard, poet (born 1884)
- 14 February – Amalie Andersen, actress (born 1861).
- 27 February – Ole Dehli, organizational leader (born 1851).
- 4 March – Leif Erichsen, sailor and Olympic silver medallist (born 1888)
- 9 March – Anders Løwlie, distillar and sports executive (born 1843).

=== April to June ===
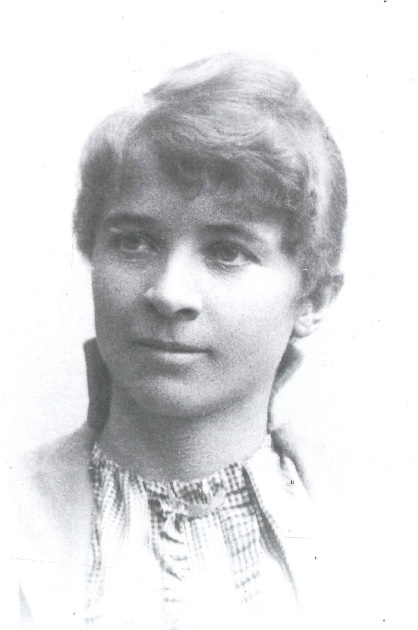
Minda Ramm

- 3 April – Anders Krogvig, librarian, writer, literary consultant and critic (born 1880)
- 11 April – Minda Ramm, novelist, translator and literary critic (born 1859).
- 12 April – Sjur Helgeland, fiddler and composer (born 1858).
- 21 May – Hans Gabriel Nissen Buck, physician and politician (born 1848)
- 22 May – Herbjørn Gausta, artist (born 1854)
- 21 May – Paul Andreas Jetmundsen Aklestad, politician (born 1837)

=== July to September ===
- 18 July – Anton Aure, bibliographer (born 1884).
- August – Sofus Arctander, politician and Minister (born 1845)
- 29 September Ragna Vilhelmine Nielsen, pedagogue and feminist (born 1845)

=== October to December ===
- 10 October – Edvard Liljedahl, politician and Minister (born 1845)
- 22 October – Ludvig Bergh, actor, theatre director (born 1865).
- 8 December – Carl Anton Larsen, mariner and Antarctic explorer (born 1860)

Full date unknown

- Karl Anton Sanderød, politician (born 1855)
