= 1926 in Norway =

- Centuries: 18th; 19th; 20th; 21st
- Decades: 1900s; 1910s; 1920s; 1930s; 1940s
- See also: List of years in Norway

Events in the year 1926 in Norway.

== Incumbents ==
- Monarch – Haakon VII.

== Events ==
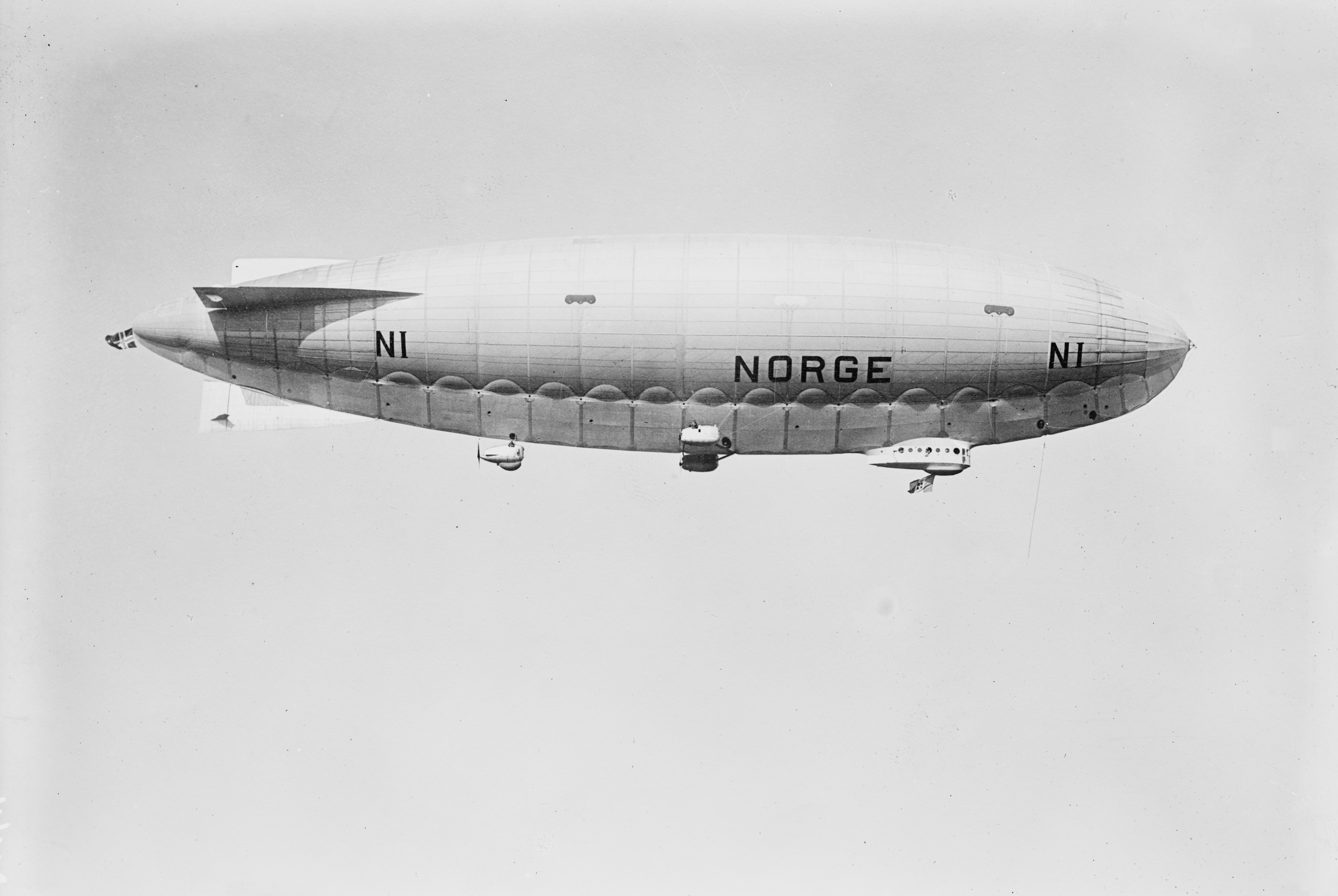
Air ship "Norge" flies over the North Pole

- May 11–14 – Roald Amundsen makes the first airship flight over the North Pole. The Norge leaves Spitsbergen and arrives in Teller, Alaska three days later.
- September – Abraham Berge, as the only Norwegian Prime Minister ever is impeached. The charge was withholding information relating to the government rescue of a bank threatened by bankruptcy. He was, however, acquitted in 1927, along with the six ministers who stood trial alongside him.
- 26 September – Ullevaal Stadion opens.
- 18 October – 1926 Norwegian continued prohibition referendum.
- Aasa Helgesen becomes the first female mayor in Norway.

== Popular culture ==
=== Sports ===
- Ivar Ballangrud was Men's All-round Champion.

== Notable births ==
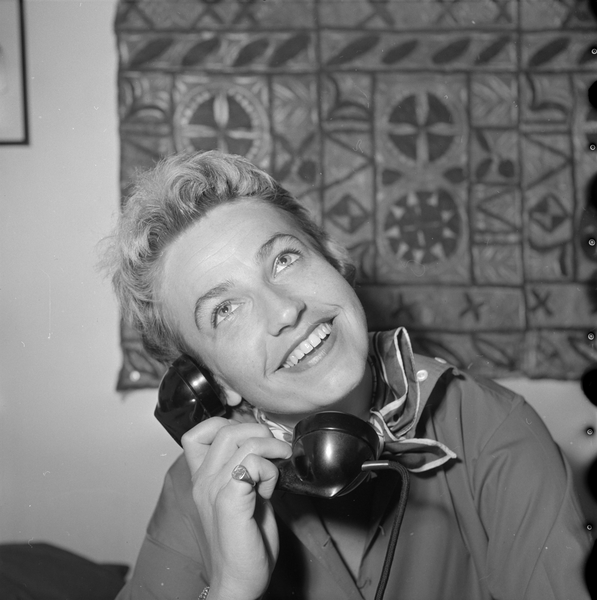
Kirsten Sørlie

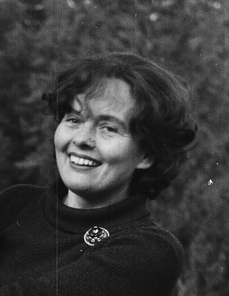
Marie Takvam

- 1 January – Rolf Fjeldvær, politician (died 2017)
- 5 January – Harald Maartmann, cross-country skier (died 2021).
- 18 February – Alf Næsheim, illustrator (died 2014)
- 25 February – Eva Bergh, actress (died 2013)
- 1 March – Erik Bye, journalist, artist and radio and television personality (died 2004)
- 1 March – Per Stavem, shot putter and discus thrower (died 2006)
- 2 March – Christian Erlandsen, physician and politician (died 2016)
- 15 March – Lauritz Bernhard Sirevaag, politician (died 2016)
- 16 March – Else Granheim, librarian and civil servant (died 1999)
- 2 April – Kolbjørn Hauge, writer (died 2007).
- 11 April – Joralf Gjerstad, self-proclaimed healer (died 2021)
- 22 April – Finn Gustavsen, politician (died 2005)
- 24 April – Johannes Moe, engineer and research administrator (died 2023).
- 3 May – Jorunn Kirkenær, ballet dancer and choreographer (died 2021)
- 7 May – Arne Skarpsno, philanthropist (died 2008)
- 10 May – Ola O. Røssum, politician (died 2012)
- 19 May – Arne Christiansen, judge (died 2012)
- 20 May – Jens Marcussen, politician (died 2007)
- 10 June – Arnold Eidslott, poet (died 2018)
- 10 June – Knut T. Giæver, publisher (died 2015).
- 18 June – Sverre Stenersen, Nordic combined skier, Olympic gold medallist and World Champion (died 2005)
- 29 June – Karl Sverre Klevstad, politician (died 2023)
- 8 July – Harald Kråkenes, rower and Olympic bronze medallist (died 2004)
- 15 July – Otto Lyng, politician (died 2003)
- 18 July – Ernst Larsen, steeplechase athlete and Olympic bronze medallist (died 2015)
- 8 August – Gunnar Aksnes, chemist (died 2010)
- 16 August – Eivind Hjelmtveit, cultural administrator (died 2017)
- 17 August – Hakon Barfod, sailor and double Olympic gold medallist (died 2013)
- 23 August – Borghild Røyseland, politician (died 2020).
- 27 August – Kristen Nygaard, mathematician, computer programming language pioneer and politician (died 2002)
- 6 September – Ola Thorleif Ruud, politician (died 2018)
- 6 September – Kirsten Sørlie, actress and stage director (died 2013)
- 19 October – Arne Bendiksen, singer, composer and producer (died 2009)
- 23 October – Kåre Dæhlen, diplomat (died 2020)
- 30 October – Hans Torgersen, politician (died 2015)
- 20 November – Asbjørn Haugstvedt, politician (died 2008)
- 21 November – Odd Børretzen, author, illustrator, translator and vocalist (died 2012)
- 24 November – Toralv Maurstad, actor and theatre director (died 2022)
- 6 December – Marie Takvam, author and actor (died 2008)
- 14 December – Kristian Halse, politician (died 2018)
- 20 December – Tor Brustad, biophysicist. (died 2016)

=== Full date unknown ===
- Anfinn Lund, civil servant and politician (died 2001)
- Sigmund Mjelve, writer (died 1995)
- Christian Norberg-Schulz, architect, architectural historian and theorist (died 2000)
- Arne Rettedal, politician and Minister (died 2001)
- Hans Skjervheim, philosopher (died 1999)

== Notable deaths ==
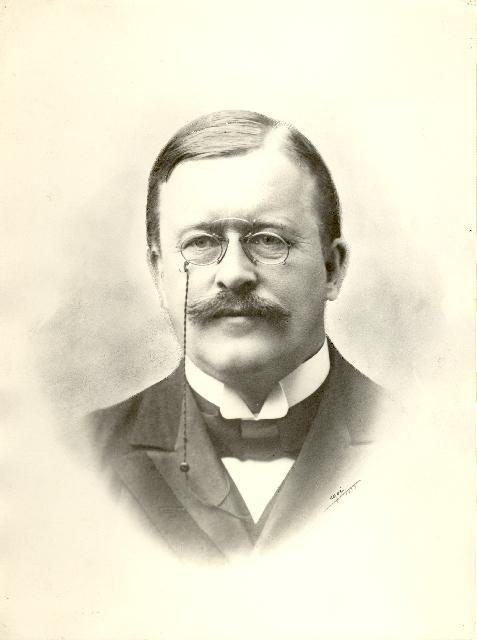
Johan Castberg

- 13 January – Mathilde Schjøtt, writer, literary critic, biographer and feminist (born 1844).
- 11 February – Inga Houge, actress (born 1856)
- 1 April – Harald Bjerke, businessperson (born 1860)
- 9 May – Nicoline Hambro, politician and women's rights pioneer (born 1861).
- 23 May – Peter W. K. Bøckman, Sr., bishop and theologian (born 1851)
- 8 August – Jens Zetlitz Monrad Kielland, architect (born 1866)
- 9 September – Anton Jörgen Andersen, composer (born 1845)
- 18 November – Peter Harboe Castberg, banker (born 1844)
- 24 December – Johan Castberg, jurist and politician (born 1861)

=== Full date unknown ===
- Torger Holtsmark, farmer and politician (born 1863)
- Peter Olrog Schjøtt, philologist and politician (born 1833)
