= 2005 in Norway =

- Centuries: 19th; 20th; 21st
- Decades: 1980s; 1990s; 2000s; 2010s; 2020s
- See also: List of years in Norway

Events in the year 2005 in Norway.

== Incumbents ==
- Monarch: Harald V.
- Regent: Haakon from 29 March to 7 June 2005 (during the King's recovering from heart surgery)
- President of the Storting:
- Prime Minister: Kjell Magne Bondevik (Christian Democratic Party) to 17 October, then Jens Stoltenberg (Labour Party)

== Events ==
=== January ===
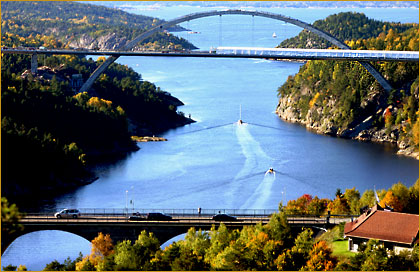
Both the new and the old Svinesund Bridges in the autumn of 2004.

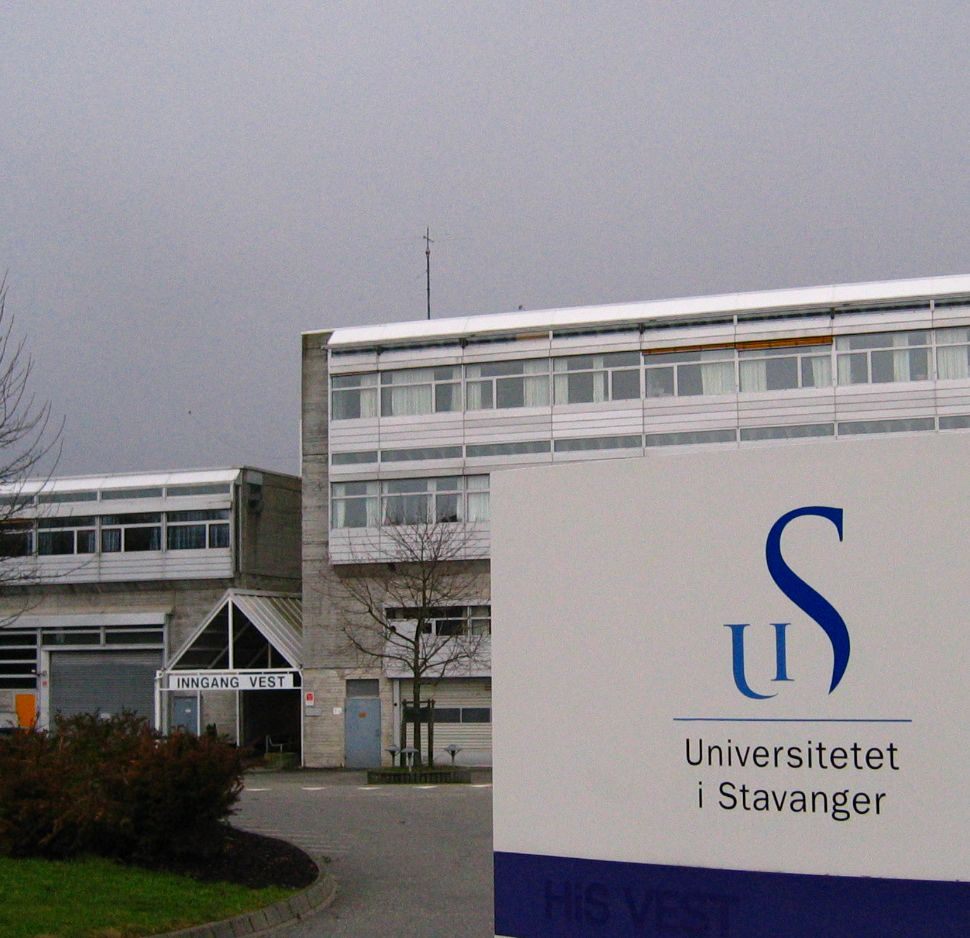
The University of Stavanger is established.

- 1 January
  - New Year's celebrations all over Norway fall silent for two minutes as mark of respect for Scandinavian memorial service for those affected by the 2004 Indian Ocean tsunami.
  - The University of Stavanger is established.

=== March ===
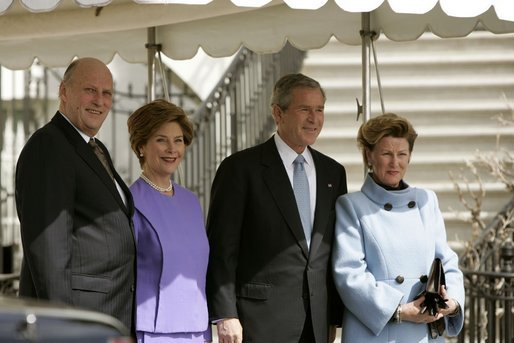
Norwegian King Harald V and Norwegian Queen Sonja, greeted by U.S. First Lady Laura Bush and U.S. President George W. Bush at the White House during a state visit in the U.S., in March 2005.

- 11 March – Ole Christian Kvarme is appointed bishop of Oslo.

=== April ===
- 1 April – Sigurd Frisvold steps down as Chief of Defence and is succeeded by Sverre Diesen.

=== June ===
- 8 June – At least 10 people are feared dead after an outbreak of Legionnaires' disease. The source is localized to a Borregaard treatment plant in Sarpsborg.
- 13 June – The new Svinesund Bridge is opened. The old Svinesund Bridge still stands 1 kilometre to the east.

=== July ===
- 14 July – The Nærøyfjord, the Geiranger Fjord and the Struve Geodetic Arc are designated by UNESCO as World Heritage Sites.

=== September ===
- 12 September – The 2005 Parliamentary election takes place. The election was won by the opposition centre-left Red-Green Coalition, which took 87 seats.
- 19 September – The trial of the accused in the NOKAS robbery starts in Stavanger.

=== October ===
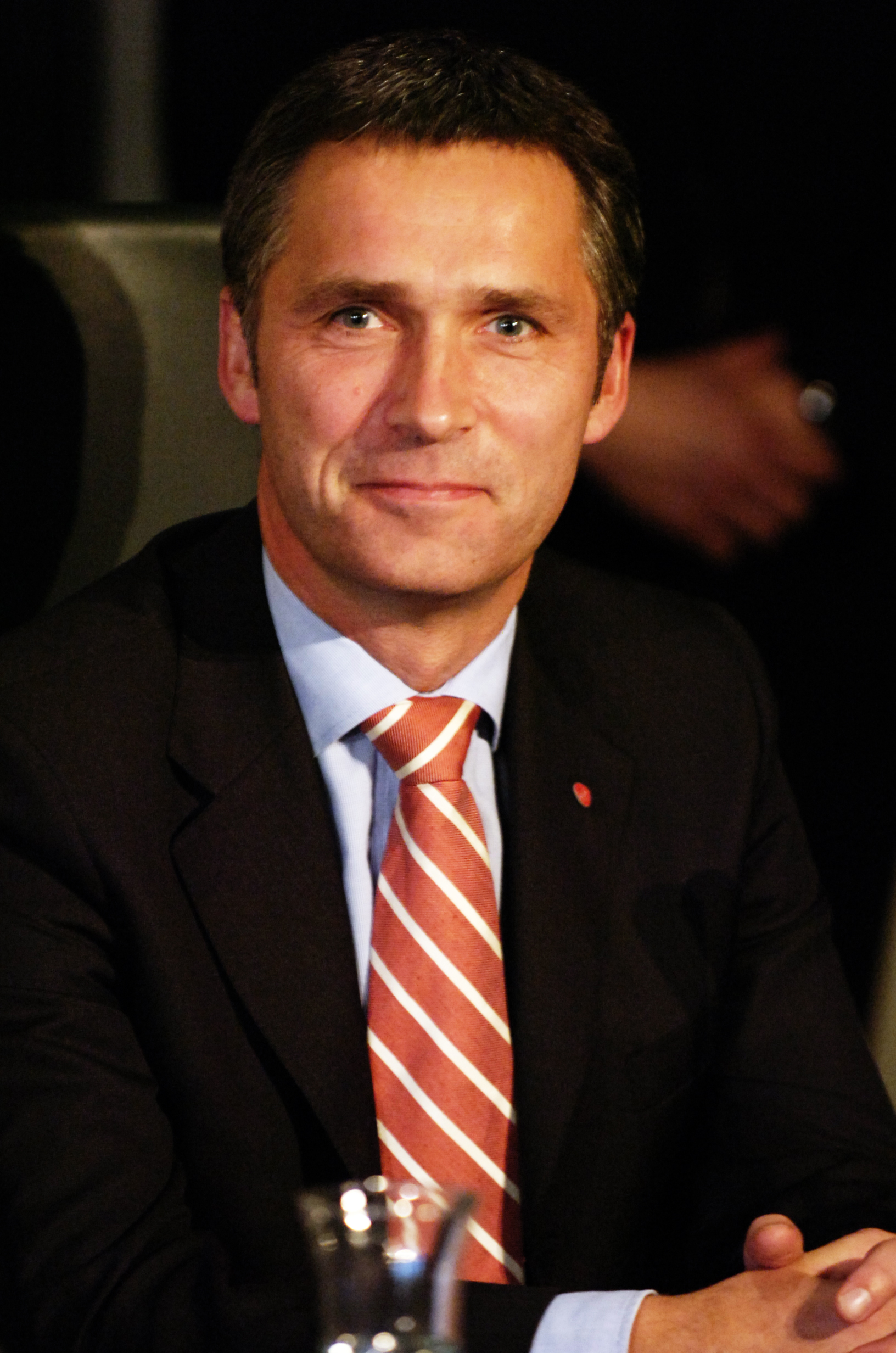
Norwegian Prime Minister Jens Stoltenberg, in October 2005.

- 17 October – Norwegian Prime Minister Jens Stoltenberg's Second Cabinet was appointed after the 2005 Parliamentary elections and Bondevik's step down.

== Popular culture ==
=== Music ===
- Norway in the Eurovision Song Contest 2005

== Anniversaries ==
- 7 June – Centennial of the dissolution of the union between Norway and Sweden.

== Notable births ==
- 8 April – Leah Isadora Behn, the second daughter of Princess Märtha Louise of Norway and Ari Behn.
- 3 December – Prince Sverre Magnus of Norway, the second child of Haakon, Crown Prince of Norway and Mette-Marit, Crown Princess of Norway

== Notable deaths ==
- 6 January – Nora Strømstad, alpine skier (born 1909)
- 13 January – Karstein Seland, politician (born 1912)
- 14 January – Peter Solberg, chemist and bacteriologist (born 1912)
- 20 January – Per Borten, Prime Minister (born 1913)
- 2 February – Anders Hveem, bobsledder (born 1924)
- 2 February – Svein Kvia, footballer (born 1947)
- 20 February – Johan Østby, politician (born 1924)
- 11 March – Helge Larsen, biochemist and microbiologist (born 1922).
- 12 March – Johan Skipnes, politician (born 1909)
- 17 March – Sverre Holm, actor (born 1931)
- 5 April – Ola H. Metliaas, civil servant and politician (born 1943).
- 8 April – Jeremi Wasiutyński, astrophysicist and philosopher (born 1907).
- 14 April – Lothar Lindtner, actor (born 1917).
- 23 April – Per Sandal, historian (born 1942).
- 20 May – Einar Brusevold, politician (born 1919).
- 31 May – Ole J. Malm, physician (born 1910).
- 2 June – Gunder Gundersen, Nordic combined skier and sports official (born 1930)
- 7 July – Gunnar Fredrik Hellesen, politician (born 1913)
- 15 July – Anders Hagen, historian (born 1921).
- 20 July – Finn Gustavsen, politician (born 1926)
- 21 August – Liv Aasen, politician (born 1928)

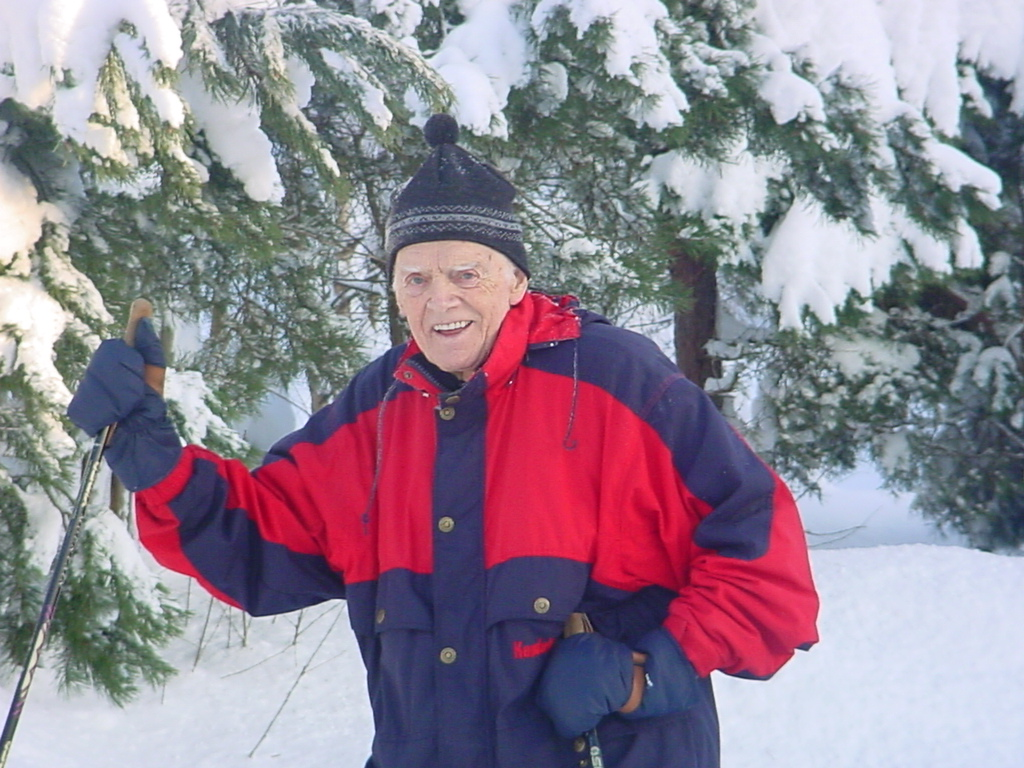
Kåre Kristiansen

- 24 September – Arna Vågen, missionary and politician (born 1905)
- 8 October – Erik Grønseth, sociologist (born 1925)
- 18 October – Sverre Mitsem, judge (born 1944)
- 29 October – Elsa Skjerven, politician (born 1919)
- 1 November – Carl Mortensen, sailor (born 1919)
- 4 November – Knut Mykland, historian (born 1920).
- 7 November – Veslemøy Haslund, actress (born 1939).
- 12 November – Jon Bremer, biochemist (born 1928).
- 23 November – Ingvil Aarbakke, artist (born 1970)
- 1 December – Roar Petersen, novelist (born 1934).
- 3 December – Kåre Kristiansen, politician (born 1920)
- 9 December – Peder B. Braathe, forester (born 1919)
- 17 December – Sverre Stenersen, Nordic combined skier (born 1926)

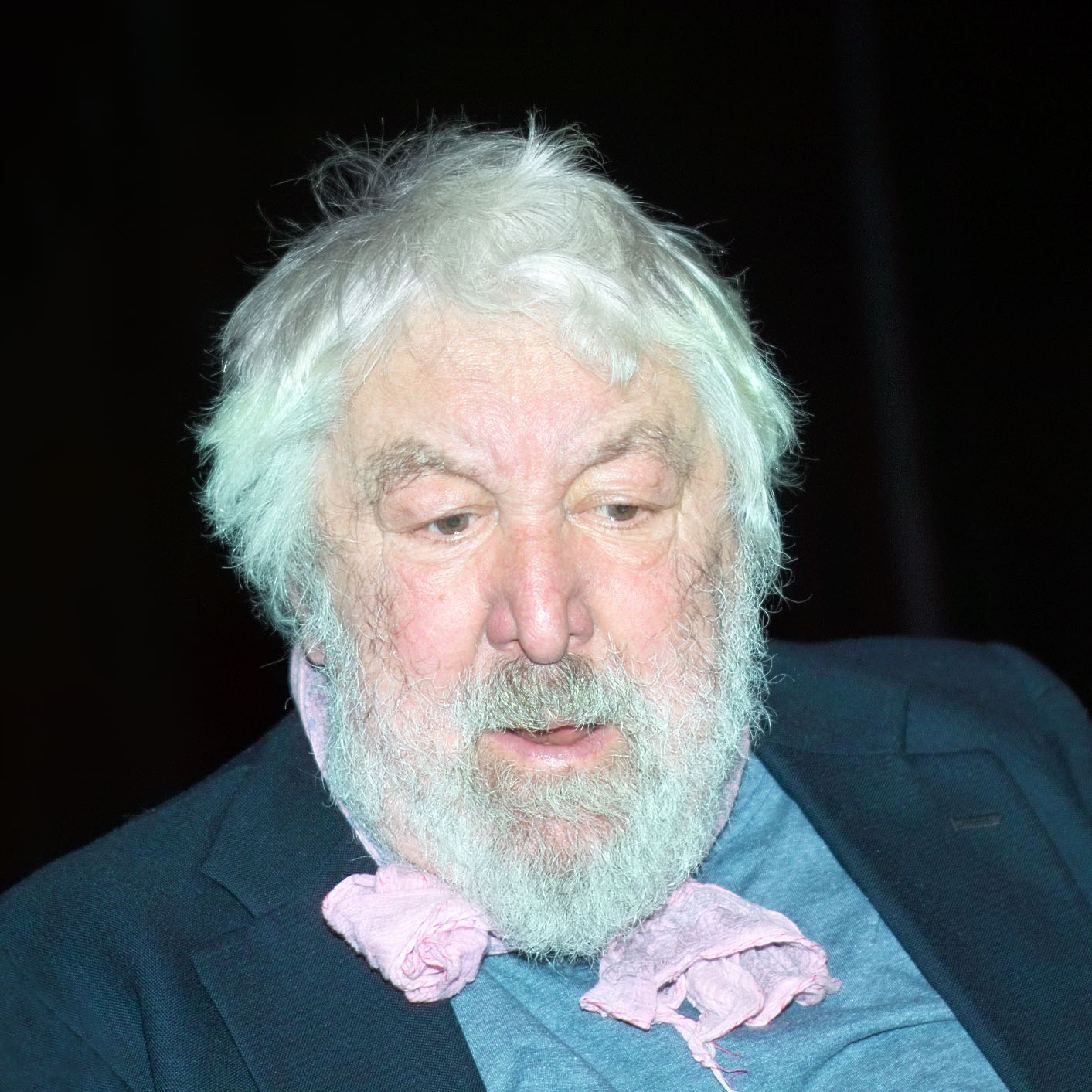
Georg Johannesen Photo: Gisle Hannemyr

- 24 December – Georg Johannesen, author and professor of rhetoric (born 1931)
- 28 December – Kristen Arnesen, pathologist (born 1918)
- 29 December – Gerda Boyesen, founder of Biodynamic Psychology (born 1922)

Full date missing

- Jens-Halvard Bratz, businessman and politician (born 1920)
- Eivind Erichsen, economist and civil servant (born 1917)
- Reidar Grønhaug, social anthropologist (born 1938)
- Geir Grung, diplomat (born 1938)
- Ivar Johansen, journalist and editor (born 1923)
- Ove Skaug, engineer and civil servant (born 1912)
