= 1861 in Norway =

- Centuries: 17th; 18th; 19th; 20th; 21st
- Decades: 1840s; 1850s; 1860s; 1870s; 1880s
- See also: 1861 in Sweden; List of years in Norway

Events in the year 1861 in Norway.

== Incumbents ==
- Monarch: Charles IV.
- First Minister: Frederik Stang

== Events ==
- The town of Gjøvik is founded.

== Arts and literature ==
- Ferdaminni fraa Sumaren 1860 (A remembrance of a journey in the summer 1860) was written by Aasmund Olavsson Vinje.

== Births ==
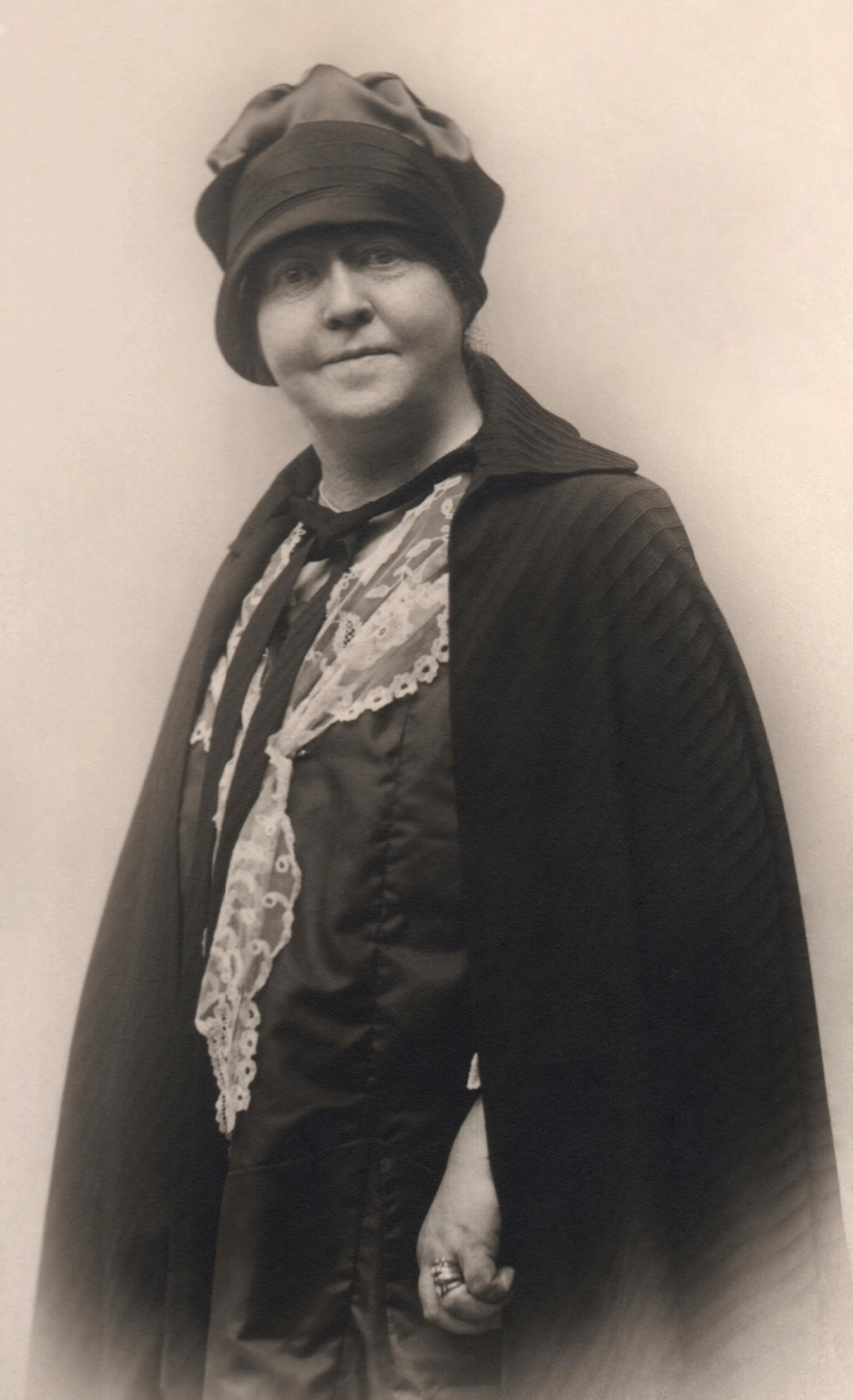
Fredrikke Mørck

- 1 January – Nicoline Hambro, politician and women's rights pioneer (died 1926).
- 9 March – Monthei Eriksen Haug, politician (died 1933)
- 18 April – Christian Emil Stoud Platou, railroad director and politician (died 1923)
- 19 April – Amalie Andersen, actress (died 1924).
- 23 July – Hans Bergersen Wergeland, politician
- 10 October – Fridtjof Nansen, explorer, scientist and diplomat, awarded the Nobel Peace Prize in 1922 (died 1930)
- 9 November – Fredrikke Mørck, liberal feminist, magazine editor (died 1934).
- 21 December – Valentin Valentinsen, engineer and politician

=== Full date unknown ===
- Pauline Fjelde, Norwegian-American painter, needlework artist and weaver (died 1923)
- Ludvig Meyer, barrister, newspaper editor and politician (died 1938)
- Olaf Norli, bookseller and publisher (died 1959)
- Anton Thorkildsen Omholt, politician and Minister (died 1925)
- Edvard Sverdrup, theologian (died 1923)

== Deaths ==
- 22 January – Peder Klykken, politician (born 1772)
- 6 June – David Vogt, politician (born 1793)
- 16 October – Broder Lysholm Krohg, military officer and civil servant (born 1777)
