= 2007 in Norway =

- Centuries: 19th; 20th; 21st
- Decades: 1980s; 1990s; 2000s; 2010s; 2020s
- See also: List of years in Norway

Events in the year 2007 in Norway.

== Incumbents ==
- Monarch – Harald V.
- Prime Minister – Jens Stoltenberg

== Events ==
=== January ===
- 13 January – The Greek ship Server breaks in half off the Norwegian coast, releasing over 200 tons of crude oil.
- 15 January – TV 2 Nyhetskanalen starts broadcasting and becomes Norway's first 24-hour news channel.

=== March ===
- 9 March – Gerd-Liv Valla resigns as the leader of the Norwegian Confederation of Trade Unions.
- 10 March – Worker's Communist Party and Red Electoral Alliance, as well as their common youth organization Red Youth, merge to become the Red Party.
- 12 March – In a radio interview on NRK P3, painter Marianne Aulie names two people who attempted to drug and rape her.

=== April ===
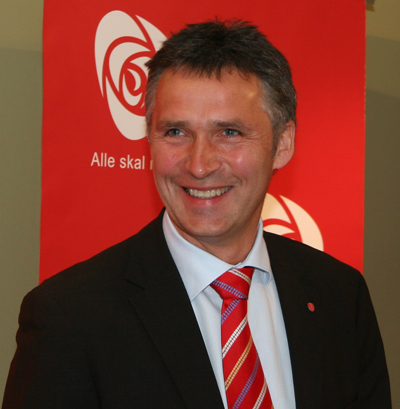
Norwegian Prime Minister Jens Stoltenberg, in April 2007.

- 3 April – A 41-year-old man admits to have killed Inger Johanne Apenes in 1978 as a 13-year-old.
- 12 April – Eight people are killed when the Norwegian supply vessel Bourbon Dolphin capsized off the coast of Shetland and sank three days later while preparations were being made to tow her to shore.
- 26–27 April – NATO summit in Oslo.
- 30 April – A 35-year-old woman and her 7-year-old niece is found murdered in Overhalla Municipality in Nord-Trøndelag. The woman's ex-husband was later arrested for the murder.

=== May ===
- 17 May – Docks located in Trondheim are completely destroyed in a fire.

=== August ===
- 23 August – Per Ditlev-Simonsen resigned as mayor of Oslo after it was revealed that he held a secret Swiss bank account for which he did not pay the Norwegian wealth tax on.

=== September ===
- 10 September – Municipal and county elections are held throughout the country.

=== October ===
- 1 October – The merging of the oil businesses between the two Norwegian companies Norsk Hydro and Statoil, to form StatoilHydro, which was announced in December 2006, is completed.

=== November ===
- 24 November – 3 people are killed and 24 are injured when a bus overturns in the Verdal Municipality.
- 28 November – Terra Securities files for bankruptcy as a result of the Terra Securities scandal.

=== December ===
- 1 December – The Lofoten Mainland Connection officially opens, giving direct access to Lofoten from the surrounding municipalities.
- 12 December – Statfjord oil spill: thousands of tonnes of oil were spilled into the North Sea during the loading of a tanker at the Statfjord oil field. The spill, estimated at 21,750 barrels (approx 3,000 metric tons), was Norway's second largest ever oil spill.
- 30 December – Five people were seriously injured after an explosion in a residential building in Lund Municipality in Rogaland. The explosion occurred due to tampering with fireworks.
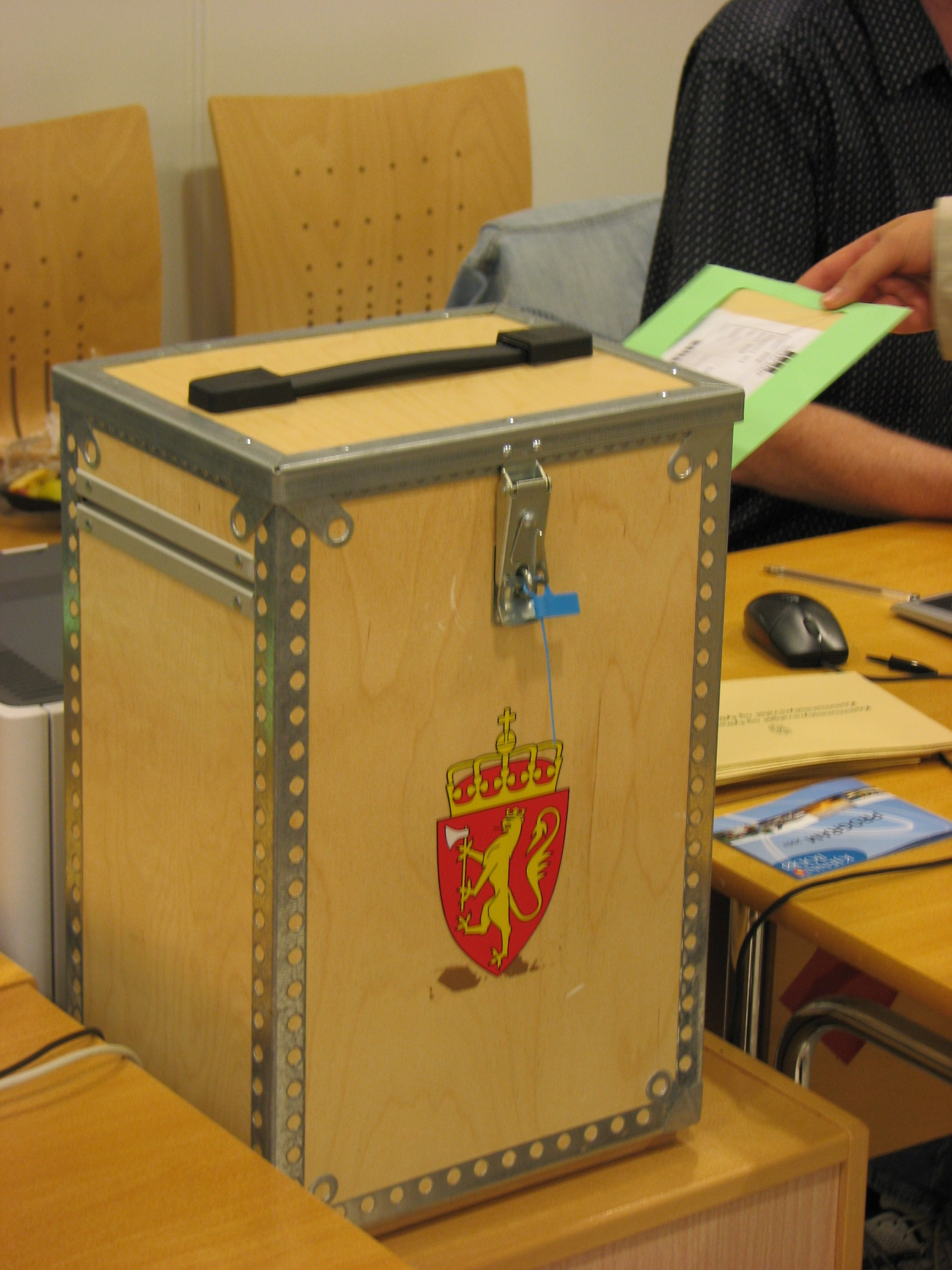
  Municipal and county elections are held throughout the country.

== Popular culture ==
=== Music ===
- Norway in the Eurovision Song Contest 2007

=== Film ===
- 2 February – The Junior Olsen Gang and the Silver Mine Mystery, directed by Arne Lindtner Næss, was released in Norway.
- 23 February – USA vs. Al-Arian, directed by Line Halvorsen, was released in Norway.
- 2 March – Mirush, directed by Marius Holst, was released in Norway.
- 30 March – On a Tightrope, directed by Petr Lom, was released in Norway. The film was awarded Grand Prix at the Chicago International Documentary Film Festival 2007.

=== Literature ===
- The novella Andvake by Jon Fosse is published. In 2015, Fosse was awarded the Nordic Council Literature Prize, for Andvake, Olavs draumar and Kveldsvævd.

== Notable deaths ==
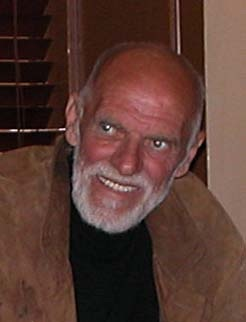
Sven O. Høiby

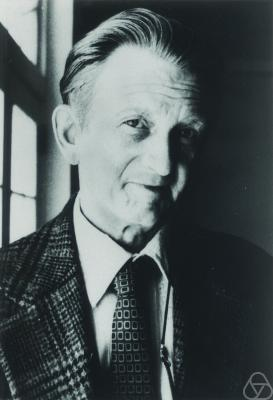
Atle Selberg

- 17 January – Tor Hagfors, scientist (b.1930)
- 17 January – Olav Per Sætren, politician (b.1935).
- 25 January – Knut Schmidt-Nielsen, comparative physiologist (b.1915)
- 29 January – Jens Marcussen, politician (b.1926)
- 29 January – Yngvar Ustvedt, writer (born 1928).
- 11 February – Lorentz Eldjarn, biochemist and physician (born 1920).
- 22 February – Britta Lech-Hanssen, actress (b. 1916)
- 1 March – Gerd Høst Heyerdahl, philologist (b.1915)
- 12 March – Hege Nerland, politician (b. 1966)
- 21 March – Sven O. Høiby, journalist (b. 1936)
- 31 March – Tom Martinsen, photographer (b. 1943).
- 12 April – Jørn Sandnes, historian (b. 1926)
- 13 April – Johan M. Nyland, politician (b. 1931)
- 25 April – Arne Vinje Gunnerud, sculptor (b. 1930).
- 26 April – John Olav Krog, zoophysiologist (b. 1918)
- 29 April – Arve Opsahl, actor, singer and comedian (b. 1921)
- 29 April – Weiert Velle, veterinarian (b.1925).
- 23 May – Tron Øgrim, author and politician (b.1947)
- 24 May – Hans Bjørnstad, ski jumper (b.1928)
- 27 May – Ole J. Kleppa, physical chemist (b.1920)
- 30 May – Birgit Dalland, politician (b. 1907)
- 12 June – Ingolf Håkon Teigene, journalist and editor (b.1949)
- 12 June – Jo Giæver Tenfjord, librarian, educator, children's writer and translator (born 1918).
- 15 June – Thor Gystad, politician (b.1919)
- 10 July – Jon Fossum, orienteer and politician (b.1923).
- 18 July – Sigurd Kalheim, politician (b.1927)
- 25 July – Bjørn Egge, military officer (b.1918)
- 27 July – Arnt Gudleik Hagen, politician (b.1928)
- 3 August – Wilfred Breistrand, actor and film director (b.1921)
- 6 August – Atle Selberg, mathematician (b.1917, died in the United States).
- 16 August – Henrik Svensen, politician (b.1904)
- 21 August – Herman Hebler, printmaker and graphic artist (b.1911)
- 21 September – Hallgeir Brenden, cross country skier and double Olympic gold medallist (b.1928)
- 11 October – Stephan Tschudi-Madsen, art historian (b.1923)
- 12 October – Egil Bergsland, politician (b. 1924)
- 15 October – Marius Kolsrud, physicist (b. 1919)
- 16 October – Ragnar "Joker" Pedersen, illustrator, editor and writer (b 1942).
- 21 October – John Stuart Gray, marine biologist (b.1941)
- 26 October – Arne Skjølsvold, archaeologist (b.1925)
- 7 November – Rolf Vevle Eriksen, footballer (b.1923, died in the United States).
- 12 November – Tinius Nagell-Erichsen, publisher (b.1933)
- 16 November – Trond Kirkvaag, comedian (b.1946)
- 20 November – Per Rand, psychologist (b.1924)
- 27 November – Svein Johannessen, chess International Master (b.1937)
- 29 November – Knut Berg, museum director (b.1925)
- 13 December – Wiggo Hanssen, speed skater (b.1923)
- 30 December – Laila Kaland, politician (b.1939)
- 31 December – Sverre Helland, politician (b.1924)
- 31 December – Finn Hødnebø, philologist (b.1919)

=== Full date unknown ===
- Finn Hødnebø, philologist (b.1919).
- Ove Liavaag, civil servant (b.1938).
- Alf Nordvang, actor and theatre director (b.1931).
