= 2002 in Norway =

- Centuries: 19th; 20th; 21st
- Decades: 1980s; 1990s; 2000s; 2010s; 2020s
- See also: List of years in Norway

Events in the year 2002 in Norway.

== Incumbents ==
- Monarch – Harald V.
- Prime Minister – Kjell Magne Bondevik (Christian Democratic Party)

== Events ==
=== February ===
- 27 February – Metropol TV ceases broadcasting because of financial difficulties.
- 20 February - Ole Einar Bjørndalen swept all four gold medal in the biathlon.

=== May ===
- 24 May – Ari Behn marries Princess Märtha Louise of Norway in Nidaros Cathedral in Trondheim.

=== June ===
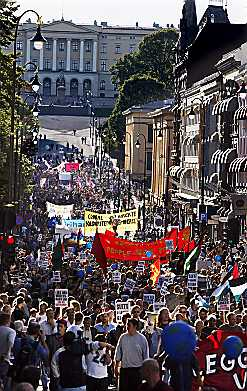
World Bank Oslo 2002 Protests

- June – World Bank Oslo 2002 Protests

=== July ===
- 12-15 July - Norway announced that they would not extend their Microsoft contract.

== Popular culture ==
=== Literature ===
- Lars Saabye Christensen is awarded the Nordic Council Literature Prize, for The Half Brother.

== Notable births ==
- 21 February – Marcus & Martinus Gunnarsen, two identical brothers singers
- 12 May – Birgitta Elisa Oftestad, cellist
- 22 July – Konstanse Marie Alvær, politician
- 5 September – Alessandra Mele, Norwegian-Italian singer

== Notable deaths ==
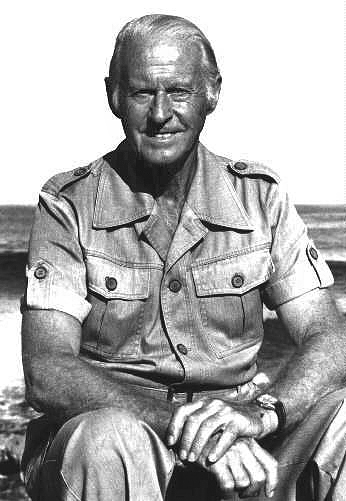
Thor Heyerdahl

- 1 January – Arne Røgden, bobsledder (born 1917)
- 20 January – Knut Thomassen, actor and theatre director (born 1921).
- 24 January – Ragnar Horn, politician (born 1913)
- 31 January – Jens P. Flå, politician (born 1923)
- 1 February – Sigurd Berge, composer (born 1928)
- 27 February – Tord Godal, bishop (born 1909).
- 19 March – Egil Storbekken, folk musician (born 1911).
- 18 April – Thor Heyerdahl, ethnographer and adventurer (born 1914)
- 29 April – Sverre Bratland, military leader (born 1917)
- 1 May – Birger Tvedt, physician (born 1910).
- 17 June – Stein Ove Berg, singer and songwriter (born 1948).
- 29 June – Ole-Johan Dahl, computer scientist (born 1931)
- 10 August – Kristen Nygaard, mathematician, computer programming language pioneer and politician (born 1926)
- 26 September – Eleonore Bjartveit, politician and Minister (born 1924)
- 2 October – Martin Mehren, businessperson and sportsperson (born 1905).
- 4 October – Per Bronken, actor and writer (born 1935).
- 10 October – Joseph Grimeland, sculptor (born 1916).
- 10 October – Sverre L. Mo, politician (born 1915)
- 19 October – Guy Krohg, painter, scenographer (born 1917).
- 25 October – Edith Ranum, crime fiction writer (born 1922).
- 31 October – Knut Rumohr, painter (born 1916).
- 15 November – Hans Jørgen Toming, visual artist and designer (b. 1933).
- 24 November – Odd Lien, newspaper editor and politician (born 1915)
- 5 December – Magnar Sætre, politician (born 1940)
- 20 December – Tore Tønne, politician and Minister (born 1948)
- 21 December – Arnljot Høyland, mathematical statistician (born 1924).
- 21 December – Harald U. Lied, politician (born 1927)
- 24 December – Kjell Aukrust, author, poet and artist (born 1920).

=== Full date unknown ===
- Odd Chr. Gøthe, civil servant and politician (born 1919)
- Johan Berthin Holte, businessperson (born 1915)
- Nils Peder Langvand, judge (born 1929)
- Oddrunn Pettersen, politician and Minister (born 1937)
- Fritz Røed, sculptor (born 1928)
- Einar Skinnarland, resistance fighter (born 1918)
- Knut Tjønneland, politician (born 1907)
