= Hødnebø (surname) =

Hødnebø is a Norwegian surname. Notable people with the surname include:

- Finn Hødnebø (1919–2007), Norwegian philologist and lexicographer
- Tone Hødnebø (born 1962), Norwegian poet, translator, and magazine editor
