= 2002 World Bank Oslo protests =

Anti-globalization protests in Oslo, Norway

World Bank Oslo 2002 Protests
- Part of the Anti-globalization movement
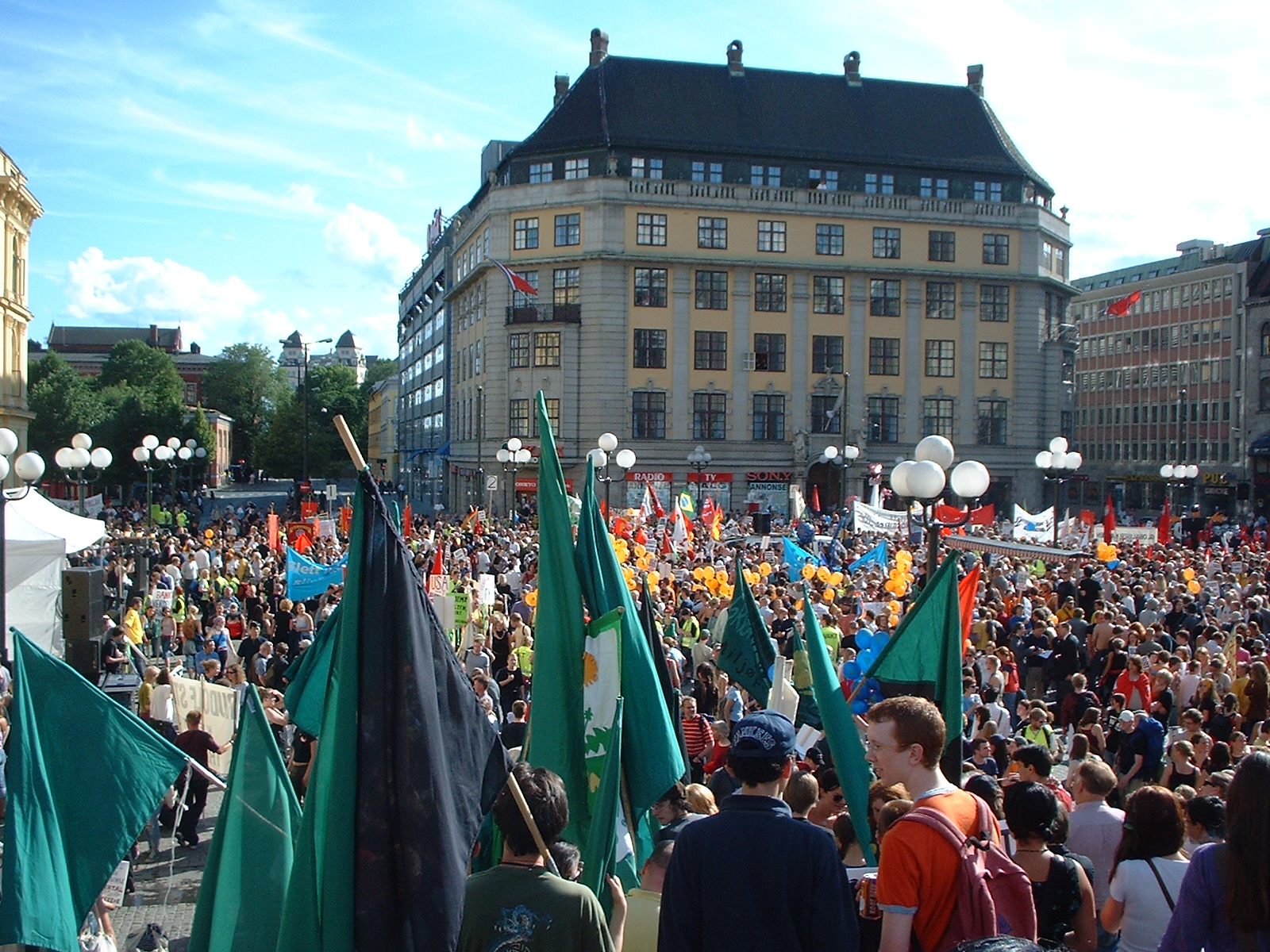
- Demonstrators assembled before the march
- Date: June 24–26, 2002
- Location: Oslo, Norway
- Methods: Marches; Conference

During the World Bank Annual Bank Conference on Development Economics in Oslo, Norway in 2002 large globalization-critical protests were held. A coalition of many organizations organized an alternative conference and a demonstration with more than 10 000 participants, thus making it the largest mass mobilisation in Norway in recent history. Before the protests, there was much concern about violence and riots, but the actual protest was almost entirely peaceful with a few minor incidents.

== The conference ==
The World Bank has held its Annual World Bank Conference on Development Economics (ABCDE) since 1988. The June 24–26, 2002 conference focused on poverty and on implementing the commitments made of the Monterrey Consensus from March the same year. The conference was held in the hills above Oslo, in a hotel at Holmenkollen. It was originally planned to be held in Stockholm, Sweden, but was moved to Oslo so as not to interfere with the 2002 Swedish general election.

== Purpose and organization of the protests ==
The protests were organized by Oslo 2002, an umbrella organization for about 50 participating organizations including labor unions, political parties, environmental organizations, church organizations and ATTAC from Norway, Sweden and Denmark. While each participant had its own reasons, here were the Oslo 2002 network mottos:

- "Our world is not for sale--stop the World Bank’s undemocratic market policies!"
- "Cancel Third World debt--release the choke hold!!"
- "Free trade pollutes!"
- "Yes to women and women’s rights--no to the World Bank!"
- "Stop the World Bank’s attack on labor rights!"

The network claimed that the World Bank is an undemocratic institution used by rich nations to control poor countries. Einar Braathen and Reidun Heiene of ATTAC Norway and the Oslo 2002 network also criticized the bank for believing too much in market-based solutions.

== Prelude ==
In the weeks leading up to the conference and protests there was much concern about possible violence. The protests during the EU summit in Gothenburg 2001 were marred with vandalism and violent clashes between police and masked protesters. The previous year's World Bank conference in Barcelona had to be cancelled and held online instead.

Many protesters were expected from other countries, especially neighboring Sweden and Denmark, but also some other parts of Europe. Extra border patrols were put in place between Sweden and Norway, a border that is normally uncontrolled. There were lists of at least 500 persons who would not be allowed to enter the country. An 18-year-old Swedish man was arrested in Oslo and later deported to Sweden. Another nine were apprehended at the Svinesund border crossing, but later released. A bus with 27 Danish citizens was stopped and their passports were copied by the police. Representatives for the protest organizers said the police should not arrest people who had committed no crime using anti-terrorist laws because it would label all protesters as criminals.

Some downtown merchants were afraid of vandalism. Vehicles were not allowed to stop in downtown Oslo for five days, buses and trains were stopped during the march and garbage cans were removed from the streets.

900 Norwegian police officers trained before the conference at a temporary training ground on the closed Fornebu airport. 20 courtrooms with judges were kept ready to handle urgent cases. A special holding facility was also constructed. The police primarily feared that unofficial protests after the large march would become violent, especially the anarchist Blitz movement. Another worry was provocation from counter-demonstrations by neo-nazi and extreme right-wing groups.

The organizers, Oslo 2002, said they did not expect violence and they have been assured by the police there would be no provocations. Masks were not allowed in the demonstration.

== Protest march ==
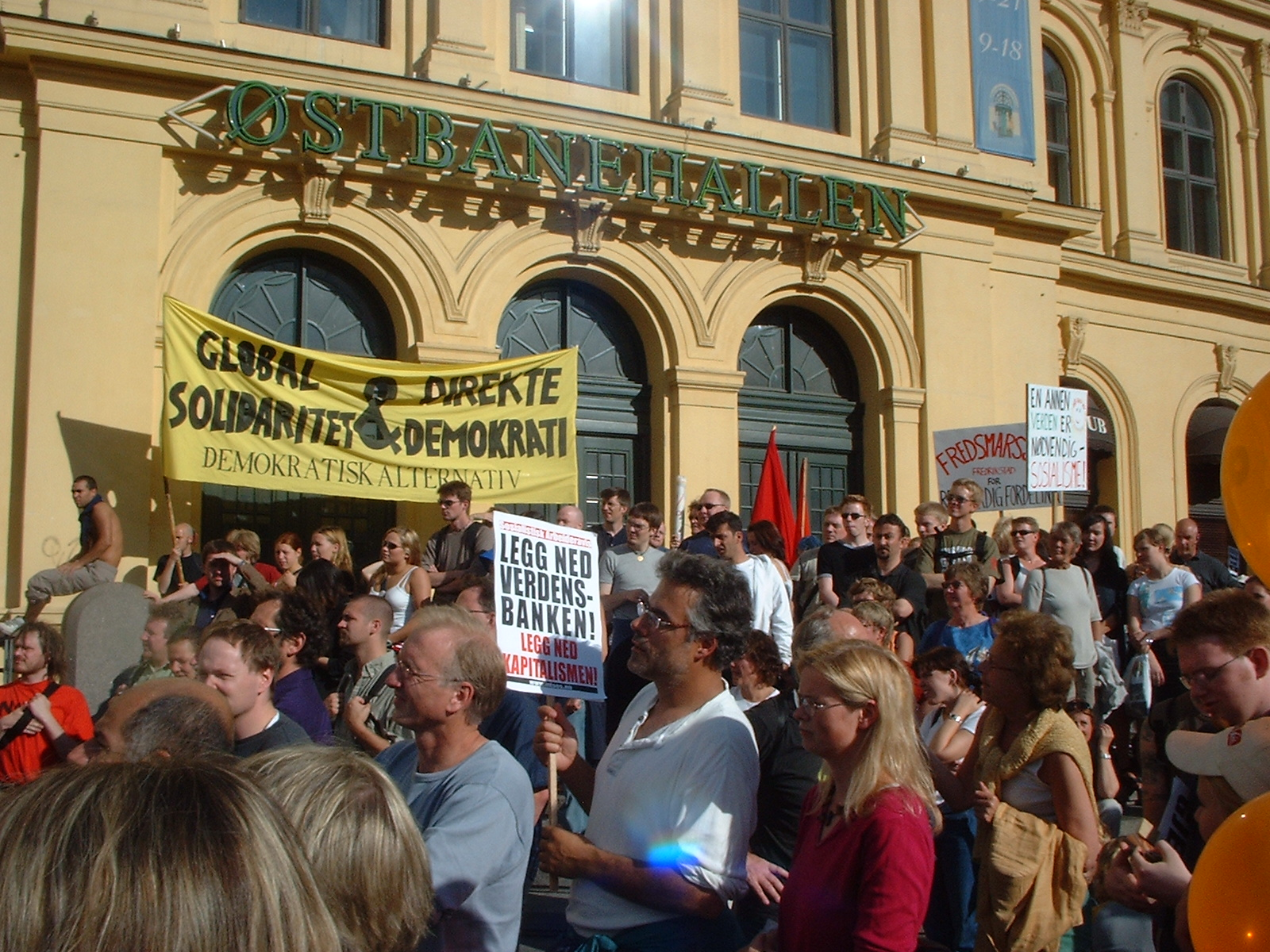
The marchers set off

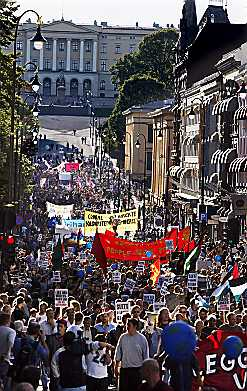
The march walking along Karl Johans Street with the Royal Palace in the background.

The protest march on June 24 started at 18.30 from Oslo Central Station and proceeded around central Oslo. Over 10,000 people participated in the march that was described by news writers as peaceful, colorful and carnival-like. At 19.45 the first marchers came back to Jernbanetorget along Karl Johans Street. On the square there were speeches on the theme "Vår verden er ikke til salgs - stopp Verdensbanken" (Our world is not for sale - stop the World Bank).

The police kept a low profile but waited nearby. After the demonstration reached the end, at least ten stones were thrown towards a McDonald's restaurant, but without consequence. The throwers were soon stopped by older participants.

Later in the evening was an unorganized after party in a central city park, which was also peaceful except for a quarrel between youths, apparently over a personal conflict rather than for political reasons.

== Alternative conference ==
An alternative conference called Open Forum (Åpent Forum) was held on Sunday 23 June. It focused on the negative effects of the World Bank and the International Monetary Fund. The conference was opened by Kenneth Kaunda, former president of Zambia. He said the World Bank's move away from structural adjustment programmes toward poverty reduction represents little more than window dressing and called for "a second liberation from global financial strangulation of mankind spearheaded by the International Monetary Fund, the World Bank and the World Trade Organisation."

The Open Forum aimed to share experiences by various social organizations, national and international NGOs, Jubilee South, the Norwegian Cancel the Debt Coalition (SLUG), ATTAC; peace- and human rights organisations, anti-globalisation initiatives and World Bank critics like SAPRIN. They criticized the World Bank for being undemocratic and becoming too powerful, at the cost of the United Nations. According to the organizers, the fundamentally undemocratic development hurt the poorest people in the world. They refuted the banks claims of reform saying it did not learn from its mistakes.

Attac also organized a debate evening at University of Oslo where some World Bank representatives and critics met and discussed.

== Aftermath ==
A police representative was happy that the protest was calm and that everybody could enjoy the nice summer day in Oslo and protest at the same time. Gustav Fridolin of the Swedish Green Party who participated in the protest commented that the Norwegian police had learned from the mistakes of the Swedish police in Gothenburg the year before. In his closing speech of the ABCDE conference David Hulme from Manchester University called (somewhat jokingly) for a "strategy for reduced arrogance". Several speakers had called for a reform of the World Bank where the fight against world poverty is taken seriously.

== See also ==
- 2008–09 Oslo riots
