= Toming =

Toming is a surname. Notable people with the surname include:

- Hans Jørgen Toming (1933–2002), Danish-Norwegian visual artist
- Ülle Toming (born 1955), Estonian dancer and actress
