= Andreas Hagen =

Andreas Hagen may refer to:

- Andreas Hagen (editor)
- Andreas Hagen (footballer)
