= Musevisa =

Song
- Released: 1946
- Composer(s): Alf Prøysen
- Lyricist(s): Alf Prøysen

Når nettene blir lange og kulda setter inn
da sier vesle musemor til ungeflokken sin:
«Hvis ingen går i fella, men passer seg for den
skal allesammen snart få feire jul igjen!»

— Alf Prøysen, Samlede viser og vers (1978) vol. ii p. 101

"Musevisa" ("The Mouse Song") is a Norwegian Christmas song by singer-songwriter Alf Prøysen from 1946. Prøysen wrote the lyrics for the song in 1946, to a traditional tune. Musevisa is a secular song, where a family of anthropomorphic mice are preparing for Christmas. The mouse-mother specifically warns her children against the dangers of the mousetrap. In December 2008 the alleged rediscovery of a missing verse from the song attracted the attention of the Norwegian media. Though an alternative ending was originally written for the song, the discovery in question was eventually revealed to be a hoax.

== Creation ==
In the late autumn of 1946, Prøysen (1914–1970), who had just left his job as a farm hand, received a commission from the Norwegian Broadcasting Corporation (NRK) to write a Christmas song for children. Before presenting the song to the network, he met with his friend Arnljot Høyland near the Oslo railway station Vestbanen, to get his opinion on the song he had written. Prøysen said he was worried about the happy and sympathetic tone of the song, since the subject was mice, considered a pest. For this reason he had written an alternative ending to the lyrics. Høyland told him not to worry, correctly predicting that this would not be an issue. Prøysen presented the song in its original form, it was accepted and became an instant classic. Høyland never heard the alternative ending.

== Rediscovery of missing verse ==
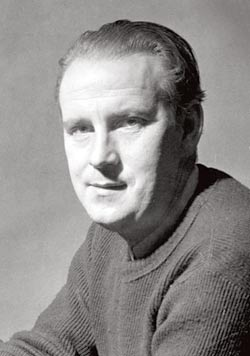
Alf Prøysen c. 1949. It was assumed that the poet, had he been alive, would have appreciated the hoax.

In December 2008, NRK-presenter Vidar Lønn-Arnesen claimed to have found the missing verse. In Lønn-Arnesen's version, it was children's program host "Onkel" Lauritz Johnson who had objected to the original verse, and asked Prøysen to write a new one. In the original version the mice were eaten by a cat, which Johnson found too disturbing for children's radio. The original verse had been thrown away, but a cleaning maid had picked it up. The woman had kept the piece of paper, but fifty years later – now living in Thailand – she sent it back to NRK. Then, in 2008, Lønn-Arnesen was editing a Christmas songbook, and decided to include the original verse and the story behind it.

The story attracted widespread attention in Norwegian newspapers, but not everybody was ready to accept it. Ove Røsbak, who had written a biography on Prøysen, had interviewed Høyland and others, and debunked Lønn-Arnesen's story as false. The song in its present version was in fact the original, according to Røsbak, and if another version existed this had to be a discarded early draft. Pointing out the poor literary quality as the reason why the extra verse had been abandoned, he still conceded that the verse was written by Prøysen: "There is no doubt about that, but there's a reason why it ended up in the dustbin." Røsbak also took issue with the late Johnson being presented as a prude who censored controversial content. Lønn-Arnesen stuck to his version of the events, but insisted that he had never intended any disrespect to Johnson, who had been his colleague.

== Hoax revealed ==
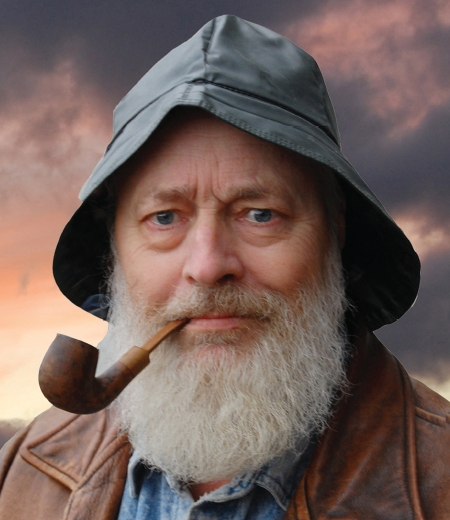
Ivar Kalleberg

On 23 December 2008, former NRK-photographer Ivar Kalleberg revealed that it was in fact he who had written the missing verse, as a hoax. Kalleberg had used an old yellowed piece of paper, and copied Prøysen's handwriting from a letter he had once received from him. He then asked his neighbor if she would compose a letter, posing as the fictional retired cleaning lady. Kalleberg claimed to have used the Hitler Diaries as an inspiration for the hoax. To back up his claim, Kalleberg referred to an autobiography he had written in 2003, where he had reproduced the verse from memory, almost verbatim.

Røsbak appreciated Kalleberg's hoax, though he commented that the episode did raise some issues about source criticism in the Norwegian publishing business. Lønn-Arnesen admitted that, although he didn't believe Kalleberg's story, if he had indeed been the victim of a practical joke, it was a good one. Kalleberg, meanwhile, was convinced that Prøysen would have appreciated the hoax had he been alive. The poet was once, in the 1950s, informed about an impostor who performed under his name. He reacted with a shrug and replied "Perhaps he sings better than I do."

== Swedish version ==
There is a Swedish version of the song - without the false verse - called "Mössens julafton" ("Christmas Eve for the Mice") written by Prøysen's long time co-operative partner, the popular Swedish composer and songwriter Ulf Peder Olrog. In Sweden, Olrog usually is known as the composer of the song's melody.

== See also ==
- List of Christmas carols
