= N. H. Ashton =

British ophthalmologist and pathologist

Norman Henry Ashton CBE
- Ashton in August 1968.
- Born: 11 September 1913; London, England
- Died: 4 January 2000 (aged 86); London, England
- Education: King's College London
- Awards: Fellow of the Royal Society (1971); Commander of the Order of the British Empire (1976); Gonin Medal (1978); Buchanan Medal (1996); Helen Keller Prize for Vision Research (1998)

Norman Henry Ashton (11 September 1913 – 4 January 2000) was a British ophthalmologist and pathologist.

Ashton studied medicine at King's College London, doing his practical work at Westminster Hospital Medical School (now Imperial College School of Medicine), and qualified in 1939 with a specialisation in pathology. In 1941 he became a pathologist for Kent and Canterbury Hospital, leaving in 1945 to serve in the Royal Army Medical Corps. After demobilisation in 1947 he was invited to become Director of Pathology at the UCL Institute of Ophthalmology, a position he held for 30 years. During this time he did key research on retinopathy, and was one of the scientists who connected the delivery of oxygen to premature babies with retinopathy of prematurity. He was the first to report on cases in the U.K. of children with larval granulomatosis of the retina from intra-ocular nematode infestation by larvae of Toxocara canis.

Ashton established the European Ophthalmic Pathology Society, becoming its first president, and after helping found the Fight for Sight charity in 1965 he became its president in 1980. He became a Fellow of the Royal Society in 1971, and was appointed Commander of the Order of the British Empire in 1976. He won the Buchanan Medal of the Royal Society in 1996 and served as president of five different ophthalmological associations before his death on 4 January 2000.
