= Kristen Arnesen =

Norwegian pathologist (1918–2005)

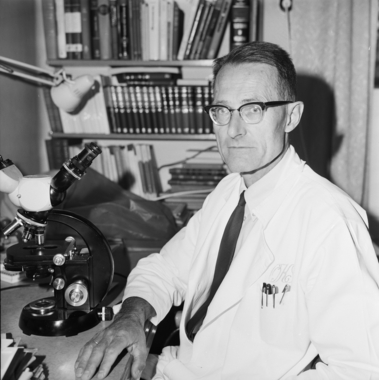
Kristen Arnesen, 1972.

Kristen Arnesen (29 March 1918 – 28 December 2005) was a Norwegian pathologist.

He was born in Kyrkjebø as a son of a chief physician. He finished his secondary education in 1936 before, belated by the Second World War, graduated from the University of Oslo with the cand.med. degree in 1947.

Arnesen was a prosector at Rikshospitalet from 1951, and took the dr.med. degree in 1956 with the thesis The adrenothymic constitution and susceptibility to leukemia in mice. In addition he spent time in several countries, including South Korea, before assuming the role as chief physician at Ullevål Hospital in 1959. At the University of Oslo he was named as a docent in 1961 and professor of pathology in 1963.

He helped establish pathological departments in several hospitals across Norway. Arnesen also became president of the Norwegian Medical Society in 1971, chaired the Norwegian Cancer Society and from 1981 to 1984 the European Ophthalmic Pathology Society. After his retirement in 1988, he cooperated with the Norwegian School of Veterinary Science and the Norwegian Veterinary Institute on projects within pathology, including ones on cancer in animals.

He was inducted into the Norwegian Academy of Science and Letters in 1974, received an honorary degree from the Norwegian School of Veterinary Sciences, honorary membership of the Norwegian Pathologists' Society and was decorated as a Knight, First Class of the Order of St. Olav.
