= Valentin Valentinsen =

Norwegian politician

Valentin Valentinsen (21 December 1861 - 25 October 1952) was a Norwegian engineer and politician for the Liberal Party.

Born in Haugesund as the son of ship-owner Johannes Valentinsen, he took a technical education and started his career at a shipyard in Laksevaag. In 1887 he was hired as head of the machine department in a shipyard in Mykolaiv, nicknamed the City of shipbuilders. In 1889 he went on to Jarrow, England, working as a machine constructor at the Palmers Shipbuilding and Iron Company Limited. He then traveled to Chicago in 1890 and to San Francisco and the Union Iron Works in 1890. He returned to Norway in 1893.

He was a member of Haugesund city council from 1904, serving as deputy mayor in 1907 and 1908 and as mayor from 1909. He was then elected to the Norwegian Parliament in 1910 and 1913, representing the constituency of Haugesund.
