= Gunnar Brøvig =

Norwegian politician

Gunnar Brøvig (8 June 1924 – 7 October 1965) was a Norwegian politician for the Labour Party.

He served as a deputy representative to the Norwegian Parliament from Vest-Agder during the term 1961–1965.
