= Per Rand =

Norwegian psychologist

Per Jan Rand (19 July 1924 – 20 November 2007) was a Norwegian psychologist.

He was born in Porsgrunn as a son of a teacher. He finished his secondary education in 1944, graduated as a teacher in 1947 and graduated from the University of Oslo with the mag.art. degree in 1951.

He was a research fellow with NAVF and the University of Oslo before finishing the dr.philos. degree in 1963. The doctoral thesis, regarding memory, was named Distortion aand selectivity. He was employed as a docent of pedagogy in 1962, was a visiting scholar at the Pennsylvania State University in 1965 before advancing to professor at the University of Oslo in 1966.

As an education administrator, Rand was prodean of the Faculty of Social Sciences from 1969 and dean from 1972 to 1974. He also chaired the council of NAVF from 1970 to 1971. He was inducted into the Norwegian Academy of Science and Letters in 1967 and the Royal Norwegian Society of Sciences and Letters in 1988.

His lineage came from Randabygda, which he often visited and where he was a known presence. He died in November 2007, aged 83.
