= Hans Torgersen =

Norwegian politician

Hans Torgersen (30 October 1926 in Øvre Eiker – 10 February 2015) was a Norwegian politician for the Christian Democratic Party.

He was elected to the Norwegian Parliament from Buskerud in 1977, but was not re-elected in 1981.

On the local level he was a member of the executive committee of Drammen city council from 1963 to 1971. From 1963 to 1964 he was also a member of Buskerud county council. He chaired the local party chapter from 1956 to 1960 and the regional chapter from 1974 to 1978. From 1974 to 1978 he was a member of the national party board.

Outside politics he worked as a glazier.
