= Arne Christiansen =

Norwegian judge

Arne Christiansen (19 May 1926 – 23 January 2012) was a Norwegian judge.

He was born in Oslo. He enrolled in law studies in 1945, and graduated with the cand.jur. degree in 1949. He worked as a sub-director in the Ministry of Justice and the Police from 1964 to 1969, presiding judge in Eidsivating from 1970 to 1974 and as a Supreme Court Justice from 1974 to 1996. He also presided over the Norwegian Association of Judges and the International Association of Judges.

He resided at Hosle. He died in 2012.

Preceded by Günter Woratsch	President of the International Association of Judges; 1990–1992	Succeeded by Philippe Abravanel
