= Annual World Bank Conference on Development Economics =

Ali Gohar Jatoi

The Annual World Bank Conference on Development Economics (ABCDE) is an annual conference on development economics held by the World Bank. The first conference was held in 1988 in Washington, USA.
