= Nils Retterstøl =

Norwegian psychiatrist (1924–2008)

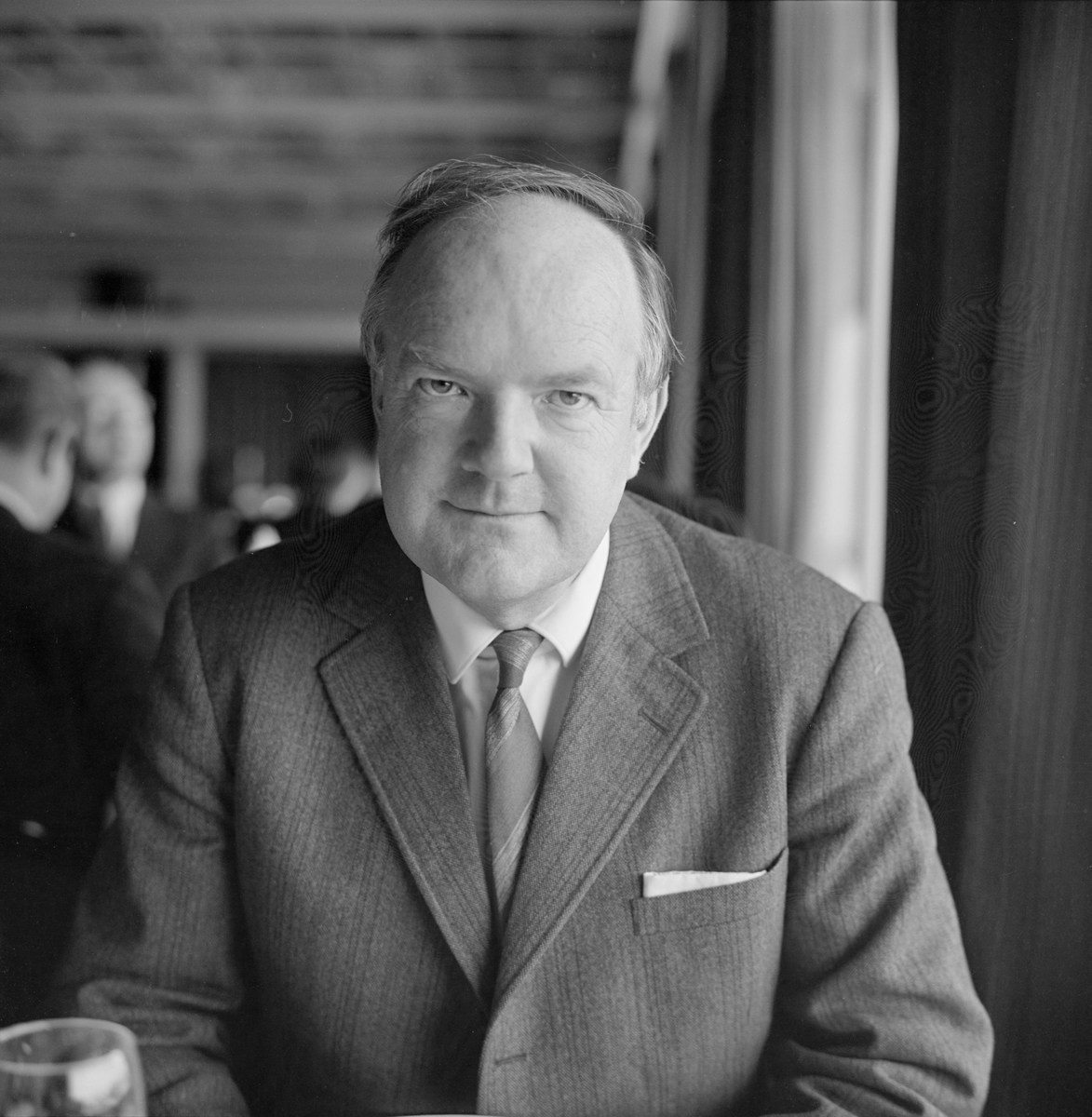
- Born: 3 October 1924
- Died: 9 February 2008 (aged 83)
- Occupations: Psychiatrist, professor

Nils Retterstøl (3 October 1924 – 9 February 2008) was a Norwegian psychiatrist. He was a professor at the University of Bergen from 1968 to 1973, and at the University of Oslo from 1973 to 1994. He published several books on mental subjects. He is also famous for saying "A man who is determined that he is right, despite everyone else telling him that he is wrong, certainly do have a serious mental illness" which was his statement in the Juklerød case, where a healthy person was forcibly restrained in a mental institution and medicated, because of him being "difficult for the authorities". Perhaps the biggest psychiatric scandal in Norway.

Retterstøl was still decorated Commander of the Royal Norwegian Order of St. Olav in 1984.
