= European Ophthalmic Pathology Society =

European Ophthalmic Pathology Society (EOPS)
- Formation: April 1962
- Headquarters: London, England
- Members: 35 Ordinary Members; 1 Honorary Lifetime President; Emeritus Members
- President: Steffen Heegaard
- Website: eopsonline.org

The European Ophthalmic Pathology Society is a learned society for advancing ophthalmic pathology, the study of the pathological basis of the diseases of the eye and its adnexa: the orbit, eyelids, conjunctiva and the lacrimal apparatus.

== History ==
Founded in April 1962 at the premises of the Royal College of Surgeons of England in London, it was inspired by a similar learned society in the United States, the Verhoeff-Zimmerman Society, founded in 1945 and at that time called "The American Ophthalmic Pathology Club". In the early 1960s, ophthalmic pathology in Europe was not yet recognized as a distinct discipline and its practitioners had rarely had a formal training in the subject. Invitations to an inaugural meeting to be held in London were sent by Norman Ashton of London, S. Ry Andersen of Copenhagen, and Willem Manschot of Rotterdam to about 30 prospective members in May, 1961, together with details of what would be expected of them:

- The members should have a special knowledge of ocular pathology.
- They should be actively engaged in this work.
- They should have adequate laboratory facilities.
- They should have sufficient pathological material to provide interesting cases for the meetings.

The society is governed by its council, which is chaired by the society's president, according to a constitution and bye-laws. The members of the council and the president are elected from and by the Ordinary Members, the basic members of the society, who are themselves elected by existing Ordinary Members and are limited to 35 in number. The council is elected for three years and consists of the president, the corresponding secretary and the organizing secretary, the latter being responsible for organizing the next scientific meeting.

The current officers are:

- President: Steffen Heegaard, MD (Denmark)
- Corresponding Secretary: Robert Verdijkt, MD (The Netherlands)
- Organizing Secretary: Elisabeth Messmer, MD (Germany)

== Functions and activities ==
According to its constitution, the aim of the society is to promote the advancement of ophthalmic pathology by co-ordination with general ophthalmology, general pathology and allied sciences. In addition, it encourages research, teaching and improvement of technical methods in ophthalmic pathology through scientific meetings. The society organizes an annual meeting typically held in a city where one of its Ordinary Members is located, and branded symposia on ophthalmic pathology in collaboration with general ophthalmological congresses held in Europe and elsewhere.
