= Peder B. Braathe =

Norwegian forester

Peder Bjarne Braathe (17 April 1919 – 9 December 2005) was a Norwegian forester.

He was born in Svinndal. He took the dr.agric. degree in 1954, and was appointed as a professor at the Norwegian Forest Research Institute in 1957. He later served as director of research from 1962 to 1972, retiring in 1987. He was inducted into the Norwegian Academy of Science and Letters in 1970.
