= Peter Solberg =

Norwegian chemist and bacteriologist

Peter Solberg (10 September 1912 – 14 January 2005) was a Norwegian chemist and bacteriologist.

He was born in Time. He finished his secondary education in 1931 and graduated from the University of Oslo with the cand.real. degree in 1939. Starting his career as a science teacher at Ski Upper Secondary School from 1940 to 1944, Solberg spent the first post-war years in Alnarp, Sweden before being appointed as professor of chemistry and bacteriology in dairy production at the Norwegian College of Agriculture in 1947.

He was inducted into the Royal Swedish Academy of Agriculture and Forestry in 1970 and the Norwegian Academy of Science and Letters in 1980. He also received the King's Medal of Merit in gold.

He died in January 2005, aged 92.
