= Structural Adjustment Participatory Review International Network =

- Abbreviation: SAPRIN
- Formation: 1997
- Type: INGO
- Purpose: development
- Headquarters: SAPRIN Secretariat, c/o The Development GAP, 927 15th Street, NW - 4th floor, Washington, DC 20005 - USA
- Coordinates: 38.902341°N 77.033402°W
- Region served: worldwide
- Official language: English

The Structural Adjustment Participatory Review International Network (SAPRIN), based in Washington, D.C., United States and launched by the World Bank and its former president, James Wolfensohn in 1997, is a coalition of civil society organizations, their governments and the World Bank researching about structural adjustment programs and exploring new policies implemented by the International Monetary Fund (IMF) and the World Bank in developing countries.

The last SAPRI report was published in 2025, on June 16.
