= Marius Kolsrud =

Norwegian physicist

Marius Kolsrud (21 April 1919 – 15 October 2007) was a Norwegian physicist.

He was appointed as a lecturer in physics at the University of Oslo in 1948, advancing to docent in 1963 and professor of theoretical physics in 1967. He retired in 1986. He was inducted into the Norwegian Academy of Science and Letters in 1971.
