= John Olav Krog =

Norwegian zoophysiologist

John Olav Krog (29 August 1918 – 26 April 2007) was a Norwegian zoophysiologist.

He was born in Meldal as a son of a teacher. He finished his secondary education at Orkdal Landsgymnas in 1938. He underwent initial officer's training in 1940, later fled to Sweden where he joined the Norwegian police troops, later the Independent Norwegian Brigade Group in Germany, and received the Defence Medal 1940–1945. After the war he took the cand.real. degree in zoology in 1949. He worked several years in the United States, including a stint in Alaska and one year as a visiting professor at the University of Kentucky.

Krog was a research fellow at Ullevål Hospital from 1954, and prosector from 1962. In 1964 he took the dr.philos. degree with the doctoral thesis A comparative study on the effect of cervical sympathetic stimulation on cerebral blood flow. Following that he was appointed as a professor of zoophysiology at the University of Oslo in 1966. He was inducted into the Norwegian Academy of Science and Letters in 1975.

Krog retired in 1988. Main hobbies included hunting and fishing. He died in April 2007, aged 88.
