= Arne Tjersland =

Norwegian politician

Arne Tjersland (13 February 1924 – 16 April 2015) was a Norwegian politician for the Liberal Party and later the Liberal People's Party.

He served as a deputy representative to the Norwegian Parliament from Vest-Agder during the term 1965–1969, 1969–1973, 1969–1973 and 1977–1981. In 1972, Tjersland joined the Liberal People's Party which split from the Liberal Party over disagreements of Norway's proposed entry to the European Economic Community.
