= Per G. Schøyen =

Norwegian diplomat

Per Gustav Schøyen (23 February 1924 – 21 May 2017) was a Norwegian diplomat.

He was born in Modum in February 1924. Following the examen artium, he took a business education, and spent two years in the United States. He started working for the Norwegian Ministry of Foreign Affairs in 1948. Positions held include those of Norwegian ambassador to Singapore from 1977 to 1981 and consul-general in Hamburg from 1987 to 1992. He also served in Moscow, Paris and Bonn during his career.

Schøyen was a Knight, First Class of the Royal Norwegian Order of St. Olav. He resided at Høvik, and his hobbies included tennis, rowing and wood carving. Schøyen died in May 2017 at the age of 93.
