= Jeremi Wasiutyński =

Polish astronomer and philosopher

- Born: October 5, 1907; Warsaw, Poland
- Died: April 8, 2005 (aged 97); Oslo, Norway
- Education: Warsaw University (Bachelor's degree); University of Oslo (PhD)
- Occupation(s): Astrophysicist and philosopher

Jeremi Maria Franciszek Wasiutyński (5 October 1907- 8 April 2005) was a Polish-Norwegian astrophysicist and philosopher.

== Life and work ==
Wasiutyński studied mathematics, physics and astronomy at the University of Warsaw, then worked some years at a factory for optical instruments, while writing a text-book in two volumes of general astronomy with professor M. Kamieński. In 1938, after the publication of his prize-winning book about Copernicus (Kopernik, twórca nowego nieba, 1937), Wasiutyński moved to Norway, where he completed his degree in astrophysics at the University of Oslo 1948. His interdisciplinary doctoral dissertation, Studies in hydrodynamics and structure of stars and planets (Oslo 1946), offers a detailed study of the mechanical and thermal effects of turbulence in rotating stars. Wasiutynski declined offers of positions at universities (in Norway and Poland), working for several years as an independent scholar; from 1964 he held the Norwegian State Scholarship.

Wasiutyński's two main works, almost 40 years in the making, were published in 2002 and 2003; The Speech of God and The Solar Mystery. The Speech of God (2002) explains his cosmological synthesis, while The Solar Mystery (2003) offers an in-depth re-evaluation of the influences that drove Copernicus to formulate his heliocentric model. In 2007, a revised edition of his biography of Copernicus was published in Poland; in 2017 this book was published in Norwegian, translated by Gunnar Arneson.

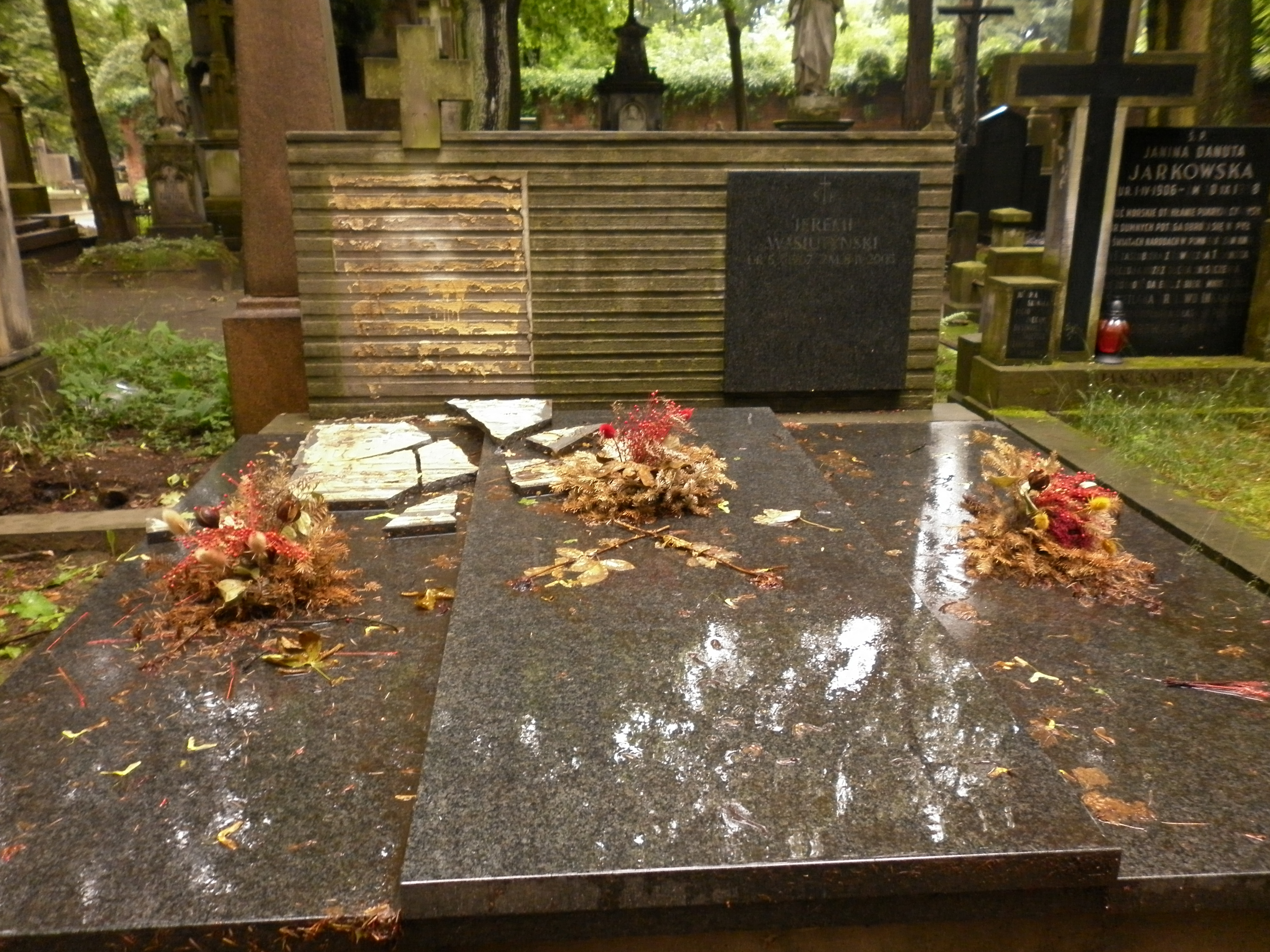

Wasiutyński left several unpublished manuscripts in English and Norwegian.

== Bibliography ==
- "Jak zbudowałem reflektor astronomiczny" ("How I built a telescope"), author's own printing, Warszawa 1925.
- "Jak konała planeta" ("How a planet died"), science fiction story in Gazeta Warszawska 1928.
- O fotograficznem wyznaczaniu momentów stycznosci zewnetrznych podczas zacmien slonca i o obserwacjach zacmienia slonca" (French résumé: "Sur la méthode photographique de déterminer les moments des contacts extérieurs pendant les éclipses du soleil et sur les observations de l'éclipse partielle du soleil"), Warszawa, 1929.
- "The Variable Star A. K. Herculis", thesis, 16 pp., University of Warszawa 1930, reprinted 1931.
- "Astronomia Ogólna" ("General astronomy"), 2 vols by professor M. Kamieński and magister Jeremi Wasiutyński 1932/36.
- "Poczatki mitu" ("The beginnings of the myth"), excerpt from the coming book about Copernicus, Skamander magazine 1936.
- "Fabryka ludzi" ("The Human Factory"), science fiction film scenario, Film artystyczny ("Film art"), ed. Stefan Themerson 1937.
- Kopernik. Twórca nowego nieba ("Copernicus, Creator of the New Heavens"), Warszawa 1938.
- Verden og Geniet, fra solsystemets dannelse til i dag ("World and the genius" - from the creation of the universe until today"), 3 vols., Oslo 1943/44.
- Studies in Hydrodynamics of Stars and Planets, doctoral dissertation, Det Norske Videnskapsakademi, Oslo 1946.
- Geniet og det overnaturlige (Genius and the Supernatural"), Oslo 1950.
- Universets utvikling. Fra senere tids forskning ("Development of the Universe"), Oslo 1950.
- "The Dynamic Constitution of the Outer Layer of the Sun", article, Annales d'Astrophysique 1958.
- Universet ("The Universe"), 412 pp., 38 pl. Universitetsforlaget, Oslo 1963; revised edition 1965.
- Creation. Materials to the General Theory of Reality, 3 vols, Oslo 1996.
- Det kosmiske drama og drømmer om den kongelige vei på terskelen til en ny tid ("The Cosmic Drama and Dreams about the Royal Path at the Beginning of a New Era"), Oslo 1998.
- The Speech of God, From the Meta-Cosmic Beginnings to the Forthcoming Terrestrial Crisis in an Attempt at Human Understanding, Oslo 2002. ISBN 978-82-56013883
- The Solar Mystery. An Inquiry Into the Temporal and the Eternal Background of the Rise of Modern Civilization, Oslo 2003. ISBN 978-82-56014071
- Kopernik. Twórca nowego nieba ("Copernicus. Creator of the New Heavens"), revised edition, 2007.
- Copernicus - Skaperen av en ny himmel ("Copernicus. Creator of the New Heavens"), Norwegian translation by Gunnar Arneson, 2017. ISBN 978-82-92792-02-5
