= Haaken Christensen =

Norwegian art historian and gallerist

Haaken Andreas Christensen
- Born: 16 February 1924; Kristiania, Norway
- Died: 9 April 2008 (aged 84); Oslo
- Occupations: Art historian Art collector Gallerist
- Known for: Galleri Haaken

Haaken Andreas Christensen (16 February 1924 – 9 April 2008) was a Norwegian art historian, art collector and gallerist.

He was born in Kristiania to Arne Christensen and Ingeborg Wiese.

Christensen graduated in art history from the University of Oslo in 1955. He opened his own gallery in Oslo in 1961, Galleri Haaken, which he was running for about forty years. Among his works is his thesis about Gustave Courbet, two books about Olivier Debré, essays on Serge Poliakoff, Horst Janssen and Alfred Manessier, and the memoir book En gallerists erindringer from 1985. He was decorated Knight of the French Ordre des Arts et des Lettres.
