= Olav Nygard =

Norwegian poet

Olav Nygard (10 July 1884 in Modalen – 11 February 1924) was a Norwegian poet from Modalen Municipality in Hordaland. Nygard is now considered one of the most important Norwegian authors of his time, but was, however, not especially acknowledged while alive.

== Life and background ==
Nygard was born in an isolated farm in Modalen Municipality, Norway, being the second youngest of altogether ten siblings. He started writing relatively early, mainly poems, and was soon determined to become a full-time writer. His childhood, however, was not easy, losing his mother at the age of ten, and having to work at his father's farm after finishing elementary school. He was a very gifted wood carver, creating, among other things, his own fiddle, which he would use playing at local dancing arrangements. He had a special interest in the local dialect, collecting tales and words told by his father. Finally, during his 1904-1905 stay at Møre Folkehøgskule in Ørsta, Nygard came in touch with a more academic group of people. He met Petra Krøvel, his first wife, who died of tuberculosis shortly afterwards. From 1909 to 1910 he lived in Oslo, partially at Labråten, the Asker residence of Arne Garborg. The advice and support of him and his wife Hulda Garborg were of great importance for Nygard, even later on in life. Nygard made his living in several different professions, but mostly as a self-dependent farmer. In 1912 he married Rakel Tvedt, with whom he had a son in 1916. The little family had money problems almost constantly, making Nygard's artistic work difficult. As his first wife, Nygard suffered from tuberculosis. He seemed for a while to be recovering, but eventually died in 1924.

== Poetry ==
Nygard almost exclusively wrote poetry. He was not notably influenced by other Norwegian authors at his time, writing in a fashion quite different from the trend. Henrik Wergeland, though, was a major source of inspiration. So was also British authors like William Shakespeare and John Keats, not to mention Robert Burns, of whom Nygard translated several poems.

Nygard is himself within a clearly romantic tradition, but with a very distinctive tone. What most obviously separates him from the increasingly modernistic authors of his own time, is the archaic language he always uses. It is Nynorsk, but shaped by his own dialect and with a vast variety of words, many of them endemic to his own poetic production. He frequently puts words together in unexpected ways, thus creating several hundred new words found only in these poems. It is also Nygard's rich language that has become the biggest obstacle for new readers, having sometimes difficulties understanding the content. If one, however, gets to the bottom of possible language barriers, one comes to discover a poetry dealing with many of life's greatest issues. Nygard is said, possibly because of his early death and rather sorrowful life, to be concerned very much with death in his poems. To some extent, this is indeed true. But it is also a vibrant poetry, using powerful images and connecting the forces of life, death and nature in a vital, ambitious way. Nature is often represented in metaphors, sometimes with a mystic and even erotic use of images. Some modernistic patterns can be found especially in his later poetry, such as the occurrence of a "meta"-perspective on his own role as a poet. But while many authors of his time wrote in a more realistic and concrete fashion, Nygard held on to an almost cosmological style.

Although rarely read by most, Nygard is considered an important author in the change from late romantic to modernistic Norwegian literature, and a major poetic talent. Norwegian author Claes Gill is known to have stated about Nygard, that he, "[...] if writing in a World language, would have been among the greatest poets in international literature."

== Works ==
- Flodmaal (1913)
- Runemaal (1914)
- Kvæde (1915)
- Ved vebande (1923)
- Dikt (Poems) (Translations of Robert Burns' poems) (1923)
- Dikt i samling (Collected poems) (1984, new edition 2004)
