= Arne Skarpsno =

Norwegian philanthropist

Arne Skarpsno (May 7, 1926 – March 22, 2008) was a Norwegian philanthropist. He became known as "Father of the street children". For many years of his life he worked as a volunteer among homeless people, people with social problems and drug addicts. He and his wife Gerd would distribute packed lunches to the needy on the streets of Oslo. He was awarded the King's Medal of Merit in 1997 for his volunteer work. In 2007 a bust of him was introduced at the area informally known as "Plata" (The Platter) in downtown Oslo, the city's center point for heroin and illegal drugs trade for several years. Skarpsno was present at the introduction and he urged the general population to do more for other people. Having taken a blood test in May 2006, it became clear that he had cancer, and he was admitted to the Akershus University Hospital in November the same year. There a kidney and a tumor were removed. He died at Akershus University Hospital.

== Awards ==
- 2006 Norske Kvinners Sanitetsforening's (Norwegian Women's Aid Society) Fredrikke Award
- 2007 HM The King's Medal of Merit in Silver
