= Ny Tid (publishing house) =

Norwegian publishing house

Ny Tid was a Norwegian publishing house with connections to the Communist Party of Norway.

Between 1924 and 1928, it published works by many of the party's most prominent politicians; translations of writings by Vladimir Lenin, Joseph Stalin, Grigory Zinoviev, and others; and poems by Rudolf Nilsen. One of the most important publications by a Norwegian was Olav Scheflo's Den røde tråd i Norges historie, which was controversial within the party.

Kristian Aune was responsible for the publishing house.
