= Enok Palm =

Norwegian mathematician (1924–2012)

Enok Johannes Palm (5 December 1924 – 31 August 2012) was a Norwegian mathematician.

He was born in Kristiansand. He took the cand.real. degree in 1950 and the dr.philos. degree at the University of Oslo in 1954. He was a professor in mechanics at the Norwegian Institute of Technology from 1960 to 1963 and professor of applied mathematics at the University of Oslo until 1963 to 1994. He was a fellow of the Norwegian Academy of Science and Letters from 1959 and the Royal Norwegian Society of Sciences and Letters from 1961. He was decorated as a Knight, First Class of the Order of St. Olav in 1993.
