= Broder Lysholm Krohg =

Norwegian military officer and civil servant

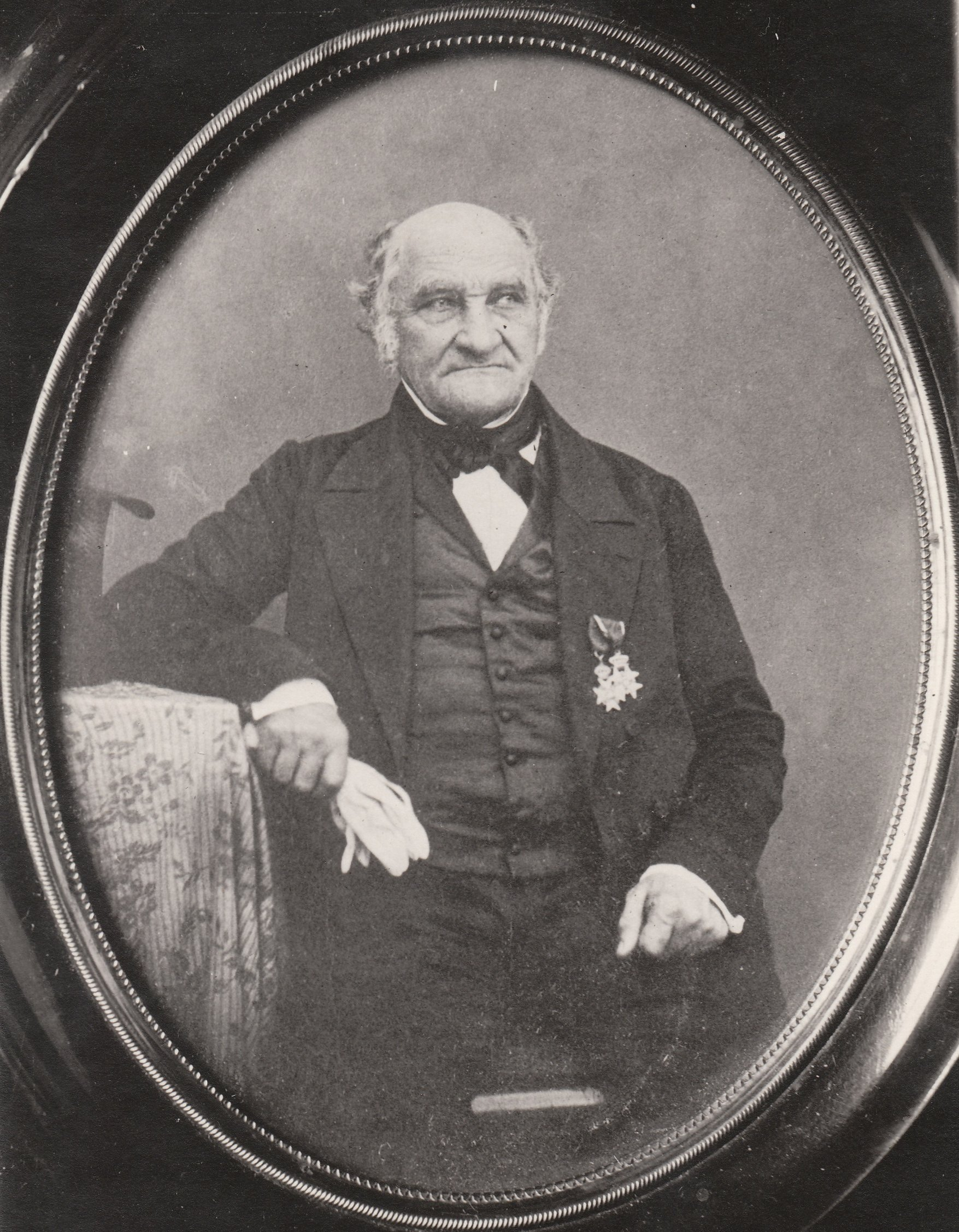
Broder Lysholm Krohg;Norwegian Army officer

Broder Lysholm Krohg (19 August 1777 – 16 October 1861) was a Norwegian military officer and civil servant.
