= Sverre Andresen =

Norwegian politician (1924–1994)

- Born: Sverre Oddvar Andresen; 11 March 1924; Oslo
- Died: 12 December 1994 (aged 70)
- Occupation: Politician

Sverre Oddvar Andresen (11 March 1924 – 12 December 1994) was a Norwegian politician for the Norwegian Labour Party.

He was born in Oslo.

He was elected to the Norwegian Parliament from Buskerud in 1965, but was not re-elected in 1969.

Andresen was also involved in local politics in Ringerike and Hole municipalities. He chaired the local party chapter from 1974 to 1977.

He spent his professional career as a welder and a turner.
