= Helge Larsen (biochemist) =

Norwegian biochemist

Helge Larsen (25 April 1922 – 11 March 2005) was a Norwegian biochemist and microbiologist.

He was born in Ålesund as a son of a merchant. He finished his secondary education in 1940 before graduating with the siv.ing. degree from the Norwegian Institute of Technology in 1944. After graduating, he was employed by the same institution as a research assistant. Having spent the years 1947 to 1950 in the United States, Larsen took the dr.techn. degree in 1954. He was appointed as a professor of technical biochemistry at the Norwegian Institute of Technology in 1955, retiring in 1992.

As biochemistry was a relatively new subject at the time, Larsen was instrumental in shaping the education at the Norwegian Institute of Technology. With his research having impact in the industry, particularly the fishing industry, he also chaired the committee that planned the 1972 establishment of the Norwegian College of Fishery Science.

He was inducted into Trondheim's Royal Norwegian Society of Sciences and Letters and Norwegian Academy of Technological Sciences, both in 1955, followed by the Norwegian Academy of Science and Letters in 1967. He received an honorary degree from the University of Gothenburg in 1990, and honorary membership of the Norwegian Biochemical Society in 1991. He died in March 2005 in Trondheim, aged 82.
