= Anton Blom =

Norwegian journalist and author

- Born: 15 August 1924; Rjukan, Norway
- Died: 13 January 2012 (aged 87)
- Occupations: Journalist, author
- Years active: 1948-1998

Anton Blom (15 August 1924 – 13 January 2012) was a Norwegian journalist and author. He was the first NRK foreign correspondent to Bonn, West Germany from 1967 to 1973. He also was NRK's foreign correspondent to Washington, D.C. from 1981 to 1985.

== Bibliography ==
- Norsk telegraf- og telefonforbund gjennom 25 år: 1930-55. Forbundet, 1955
- Jødenes vei gjennom historien. Cappelen, 1978; new edition: Lunde Forlag, 1998
- Elie Wiesel og ansiktet i vinduet. Cappelen, 1987
