= Gudrun Tandberg Høykoll =

Norwegian politician

Personal details
- Born: Gudrun Tandberg Høykoll; 18 January 1924 Norway
- Died: 17 May 2005 (aged 81)
- Occupation: Politician

Gudrun Tandberg Høykoll (18 January 1924 – 17 May 2005) was a Norwegian politician for the Liberal Party.

She served as a deputy representative to the Norwegian Parliament from Aust-Agder during the terms 1965–1969.
