= Rolf Vevle Eriksen =

Norwegian footballer (1923-2007)

Personal information
- Date of birth: 1 September 1923
- Place of birth: Bergen, Norway
- Date of death: 7 November 2007 (aged 84)
- Place of death: Minneapolis, United States
- Position: Defender

Senior career*
Years	Team	Apps	(Gls)
1949–1956	Brann	92	(0)

International career
1951–1952	Norway B	4	(0)
1952	Norway	1	(0)
- * Club domestic league appearances and goals

Rolf Vevle Eriksen (1 September 1923 – 7 November 2007) was a Norwegian footballer.

He played 92 matches for SK Brann from 1949 to 1956. In 1958 he emigrated to Minneapolis, where he among others did soccer coaching. He died in Minneapolis in November 2007.

He played in one match for the Norway national football team in 1952, having also played for Norway B.
