= Oddvar Vormeland =

Norwegian educationalist and civil servant

Oddvar Vormeland (28 February 1924 – 30 August 2013) was a Norwegian educationalist and civil servant.

He was born in Hof i Solør as a son of folk high school manager Ola Vormeland and his wife Gyda, née Hval. In 1949 he married Sigrun Røed, who was also a daughter of a school manager. He took commerce school in 1942, the examen artium in 1943 and teachers' college in 1948.

He took the mag.art. degree (PhD equivalent) in 1951, and the dr.philos. degree in 1967. From 1959 to 1964 he worked as a lecturer at the University of Oslo; he then served as a school inspector, and was the school director of Oslo and Akershus from 1971 to 1984. He was then a deputy under-secretary of state in the Ministry of Education and Church Affairs from 1984 to 1989, and an assisting professor at the University of Oslo from 1990 to 1994. He has published several books.

He has resided in Bærum, later at Voksenåsen and Vinderen in Oslo. He died in August 2013.
