= Reidar Berg =

Norwegian bobsledder (1924–2018)

Reidar Berg (March 30, 1924 – February 16, 2018) was a Norwegian bobsledder who competed in the late 1940s. At the 1948 Winter Olympics in St. Moritz, he finished 15th in the four-man event. He was born in Oslo.
