= Munck Cranes =

The company Munck Cranes (Sverre Munck A/S) was founded on 25 October 1924 by Mr. Sverre Munck. He was educated as an electrical engineer at the University of Trondheim, Norway. The company initially started as a trading company with products ranging from fuses and light bulbs to escalators, elevators and electric wire rope hoists, the latter being of foreign make.

== Manufacturing ==
The first Munck manufacturing plant was completed in 1946, and the number of employees increased rapidly from 30 to 300 people. This was mainly as a result of an order for 18 units of trolley buses for Bergen Sporvei - the local bus company, but also orders from several other bus companies in Norway. During this time, the first Munck electric wire rope hoist was designed, and full production commenced, involving hoists and industrial cranes for all major types of industry on shore as well as on board ships.

== Export pioneer ==
The Munck Company has been a pioneer within the Norwegian export industry. The very first Munck hoist for export was shipped to Sweden in 1948, and the same year also to England. Thereafter the export to very many overseas markets picked up rapidly.

Later, in the 1950s and 1960s, subsidiary companies were established in the United States, Canada, Great Britain, Sweden, Brazil and Belgium. Further, a network of agents were established in other parts of the world. Still today, Munck is working very closely with many of these companies, although they are managed by local owners.

== Ownership ==
Munck Cranes AS is part of the Furnes Hamjern Group of Companies. As from October 1996 Munck Cranes AS is wholly owned by Øyhovden Invest AS

== Bankruptcy Munck Cranes AS (Norway) ==
In late May 2023, Munck Cranes AS entered bankruptcy proceedings. In June 2023, Finland-based Konecranes acquired the company's industrial crane service business in Norway, comprising approximately 40 employees across four regional teams, from the bankruptcy estate; the acquisition strengthened Konecranes' Nordic operations but did not include the wider Munck Cranes group.

== Munck Cranes Inc (Canada) ==
A separate entity, Munck Cranes Inc., based in Stoney Creek, Ontario, and tracing back to the Canadian subsidiary established in the mid-20th century, continued to manufacture overhead cranes independently in Canada. On December 2, 2025, Munck Cranes Inc. was acquired by Zelus Material Handling, part of the Ardent Group of Companies, strengthening Zelus's position as a national overhead crane manufacturer and service provider in Canada.

Some Munck Cranes Inc. overhead crane products incorporate Misia XM series wire rope hoists, manufactured by the Italian company Misia srl.
