= Amalie Andersen (actress) =

Norwegian actress (1861–1924)

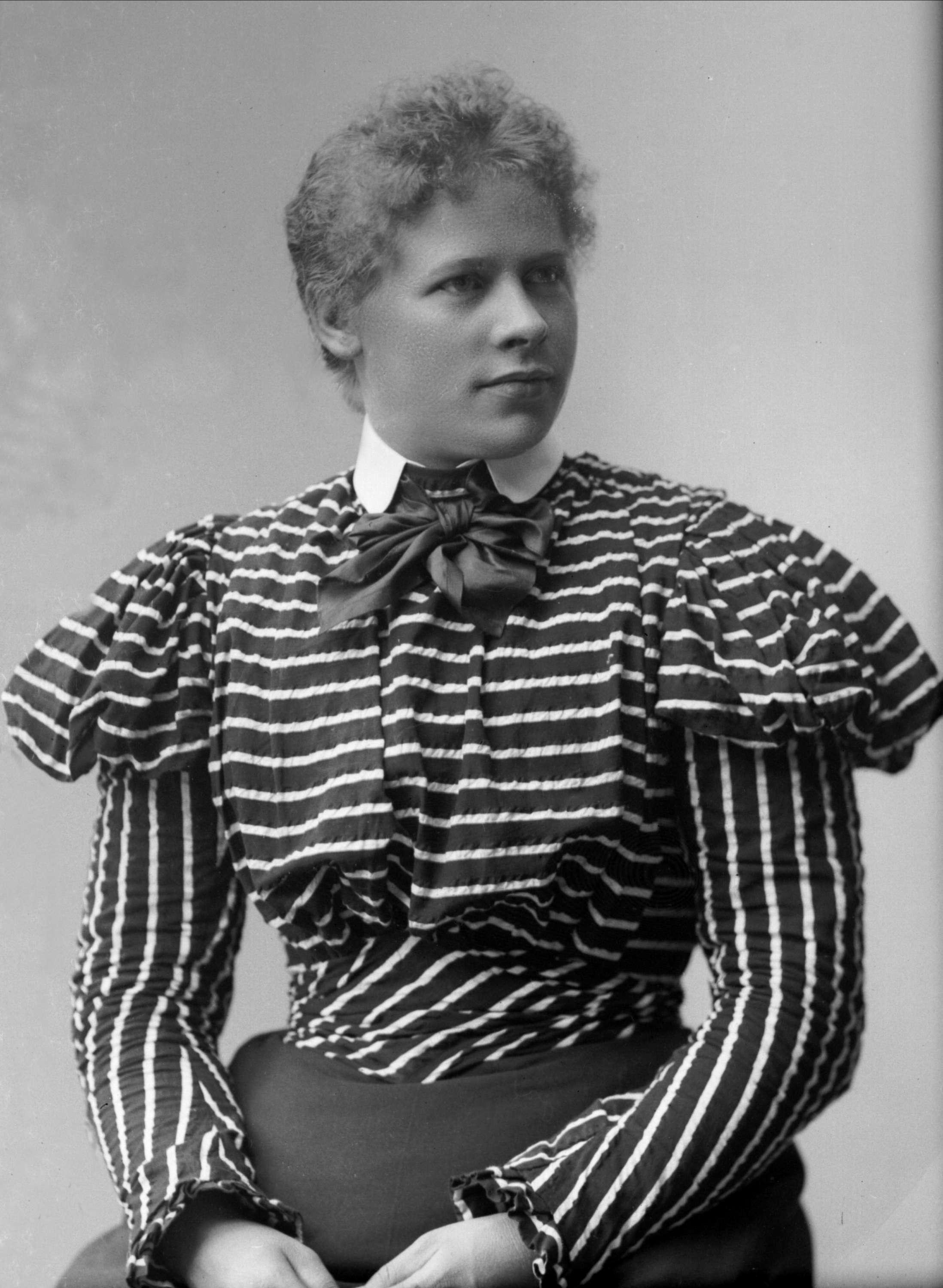
- Born: 19 April 1861; Østre Aker, Norway
- Died: 14 February 1924 (aged 62); Bergen, Vestland, Norway
- Spouse: Johan Fredrik Dahl (m. 1888)

Tilda Amalie Andersen (19 April 1861 – 14 February 1924) was a Norwegian actress.

== Early life ==
Tilda Amalie Andersen was born on 19 April 1861 in Østre Aker and was the illegitimate daughter of cattle trader Truls Andersen and Anne Sophie Baltzersen. On 28 July 1888, she married business teacher Johan Fredrik Dahl (1859–1911).

== Career ==
Andersen's made her official acting debut as Lisbet in En Søndag paa Amager at the Den Nationale Scene in Bergen on 11 December 1881. However, she had already played Elisif in Væringene i Miklagard at the Christiania Theatre in March of the same year.

Her so-called second debut came on 5 February 1882 with the role of Inga in Mellem Slagene again at the Den Nationale Scene. Andersen continued to be employed there for a few years. In Autumn 1895, she portrayed Ane in Geografi og Kjærlighed.

== Later life and death ==
Andersen died on 14 February 1924 in Bergen, at the age of 62.
