= Anders Hveem =

Norwegian bobsledder

Anders Hveem (May 10, 1924 – February 2, 2005) was a Norwegian bobsledder who competed in the 1950s. He finished 13th in the four-man event at the 1952 Winter Olympics in Oslo.
