= Finn Hødnebø =

Norwegian philologist and lexicographer

Finn Hødnebø (December 29, 1919 – December 31, 2007) was a Norwegian philologist and a lexicographer. He was most associated with his translations from Old Norse and Medieval Norwegian texts.

Finn Hødnebø was born in Søndeled. He graduated with the cand.philol. degree in 1948. He was Professor of Scandinavian languages at the University of Oslo (1972) and chair of the department of old Norwegian and the Norwegian, Norwegian Institute of lexicographical (1985). His works with Old Norse and Medieval Norwegian texts included the work Corpus Codicum Norvegicorum Medii Aevi. He was the Norwegian editor of Kulturhistorisk leksikon for nordisk middelalder (1955–1978). He was inducted into the Norwegian Academy of Science and Letters in 1979. He received the King's Medal of Merit in gold (1993).

== Selected works ==
- The Viking Discovery of America, with Jónas Kristjánsson, editor, Elizabeth S. Seeberg, translator (1991)
- Heimskringla: The Sagas of the Viking Kings of Norway, with Knut A. Lie, editor, Lee M. Hollander, translator (1987)
- Ordforrådet i de eldste norske håndskrifter til ca. 1250, (1955)
- Kulturhistorisk leksikon for nordisk middelalder fra vikingetid til reformationstid (volumes 1-22, published 1956–77)
- Norges kongesagaer, with Hallvard Magerøy (1979)
- Norrøn ordbok, with Leiv Heggstad and Erik Simensen (1990)
