= Andreas Hagen (editor) =

Norwegian newspaper editor

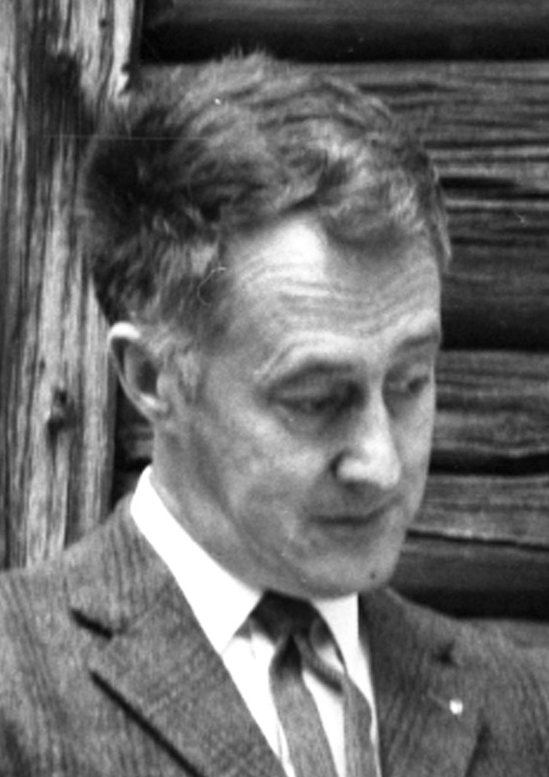
Andreas Hagen, 1971.

Andreas Hagen (9 February 1924 – 29 September 2011) was a Norwegian newspaper editor.

He was born in Våler Municipality in Hedmark county. He was a journalist in Østlendingen from 1954 to 1957 and Nationen from 1957 to 1968 before becoming editor-in-chief of Østlendingen from 1968 to 1994. He chaired Pressens Faglige Utvalg from 1965 to 1984 and the Norwegian Press Association from 1984 to 1987. He died in September 2011 in Elverum.
