= Hans Jørgen Toming =

Danish-born Norwegian visual artist and book designer

- Born: 9 June 1933; Esbjerg, Denmark
- Died: 15 November 2002 (aged 69); Oslo
- Occupations: visual artist and designer

Hans Jørgen Toming (né Esbensen; 9 June 1933 – 15 November 2002) was a Danish-born Norwegian visual artist and book designer.

== Personal life ==
He was born in Esbjerg to Aage and Rigmor Esbensen, and grew up in Odense. In 1956 he settled in Norway and married photographer Beth Andersen, and they created/adopted the artist name Toming around 1958.

== Career ==
Toming worked as freelancer most of his life. From 1962 he started working for the Norwegian book club Den norske Bokklubben. His first book, the poetry collection Fasetter, was awarded a prize for "Most beautiful book of the year". He continued collaborating with Den norske Bokklubben until 1980. Over the years he designed about 1,500 book editions. He was awarded Norsk Designpris in 1963, Amandusprisen in 1964, and Den norske billedbokprisen in 1968. He died in Oslo in 2002.
