= Arnljot Høyland =

Norwegian mathematical statistician

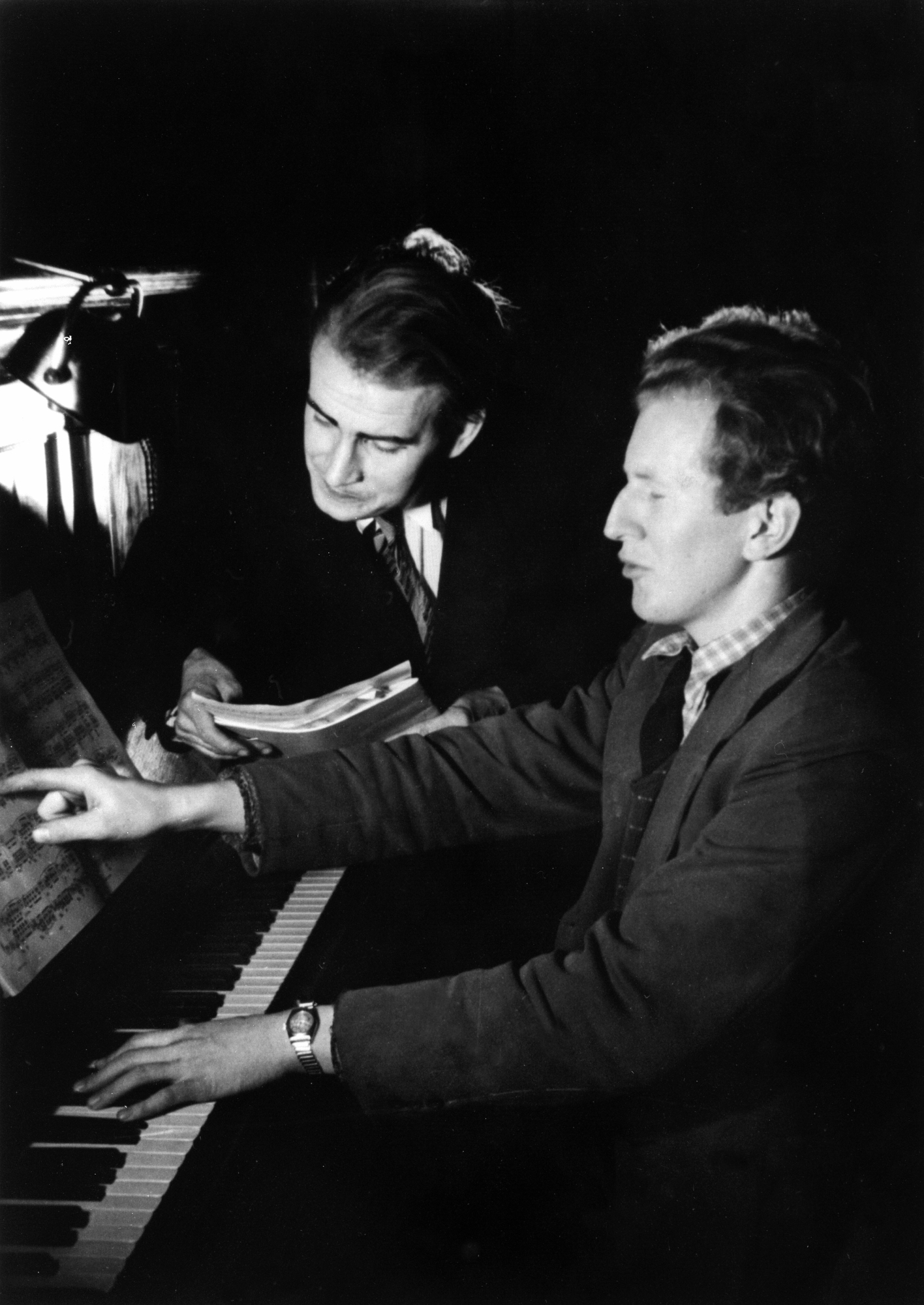
- Alf Prøysen (left) and Arnljot Høyland (right), ca 1944.
- Born: 19 February 1924; Bærum
- Died: 21 December 2002 (aged 78)
- Education: University of Oslo; University of California, Berkeley
- Occupation: Mathematical statistician
- Employer: Norwegian Institute of Technology
- Awards: Order of St. Olav (1995)

Arnljot Høyland (19 February 1924 – 21 December 2002) was a Norwegian mathematical statistician.

== Biography ==
Høyland was born in Bærum. He studied at the University of Oslo and later at the University of California, Berkeley in the USA. While a student he worked for the intelligence department at the Norwegian High Command, a military officer with the rank of Major. He lectured at the University of Oslo from 1959 to 1965, and then at the Norwegian Institute of Technology, eventually as a Professor of mathematical statistics. He published the textbooks Sannsynlighetsregning og statistisk metodelære (two volumes) in 1972 and 1973.

In 1944 Høyland composed the melody for Alf Prøysen's song "Julekveldsvise".

He was decorated Knight, First Class of the Order of St. Olav in 1995.
