= 1788 in Norway =

- Centuries: 16th; 17th; 18th; 19th; 20th
- Decades: 1760s; 1770s; 1780s; 1790s; 1800s
- See also: 1788 in Denmark; List of years in Norway

Events in the year 1788 in Norway.

== Incumbents ==
- Monarch: Christian VII.

== Events ==
- 21 August – Theater War: The Swedish attack on Russia caused Denmark-Norway to declare war on Sweden in accordance with its treaty obligations to Russia.
- 24 September - 8,000-10,000 men under the command of Prince Charles of Hesse attacked Bohuslen from Norway.
- 29 September - Battle of Kvistrum.

== Births ==
- 24 February - Johan Christian Dahl, painter (d.1857)
- 20 July - Paul Hansen Birch, military officer (d.1863)
- 5 October - Broder Knudtzon, merchant and politician (d.1864)
- 14 December - Jacob Kielland, businessperson, consul and politician (d.1863)

=== Full date unknown ===
- Asle Christensen Hoffart, politician
- Catharine Hermine Kølle, adventurer and painter (d.1859)
- Sølver Hansen Laane, politician
- Lars Thorstensen Tønsager, politician
