= 1782 in Norway =

- Centuries: 16th; 17th; 18th; 19th; 20th
- Decades: 1760s; 1770s; 1780s; 1790s; 1800s
- See also: 1782 in Denmark; List of years in Norway

Events in the year 1782 in Norway.

== Incumbents ==
- Monarch: Christian VII.

== Arts and literature ==
- The anti-union song «Norges Skaal» is first published. It was first written in 1771 by Johan Nordahl Brun.
- Lyngen Church was built.

== Births ==
- 5 June - Ulrik Frederik Anton de Schouboe, civil servant and politician (died 1863)
- 8 September - Johan Gørbitz, painter (died 1853)
- 14 September - Christian Magnus Falsen, statesman, jurist, and historian (died 1830)
- 30 December - Jonas Anton Hielm, jurist and politician (died 1848)

=== Full date unknown ===
- Peder Nielsen Hemb, politician
- Mads Lauritz Madsen, politician (died 1840)
- Ole Christian Andersen Nøstvig, politician
- Niels Arntzen Sem, politician (died 1859)
- Peder Tonning, politician (died 1839)
