= 1791 in Norway =

- Centuries: 16th; 17th; 18th; 19th; 20th
- Decades: 1770s; 1780s; 1790s; 1800s; 1810s
- See also: 1791 in Denmark; List of years in Norway

Events in the year 1791 in Norway.

== Incumbents ==
- Monarch: Christian VII.

== Events ==
- Jens Holmboe starts organized settling to the uninhabited Målselvdalen, from the Gudbrand Valley and Østerdalen.

== Births ==
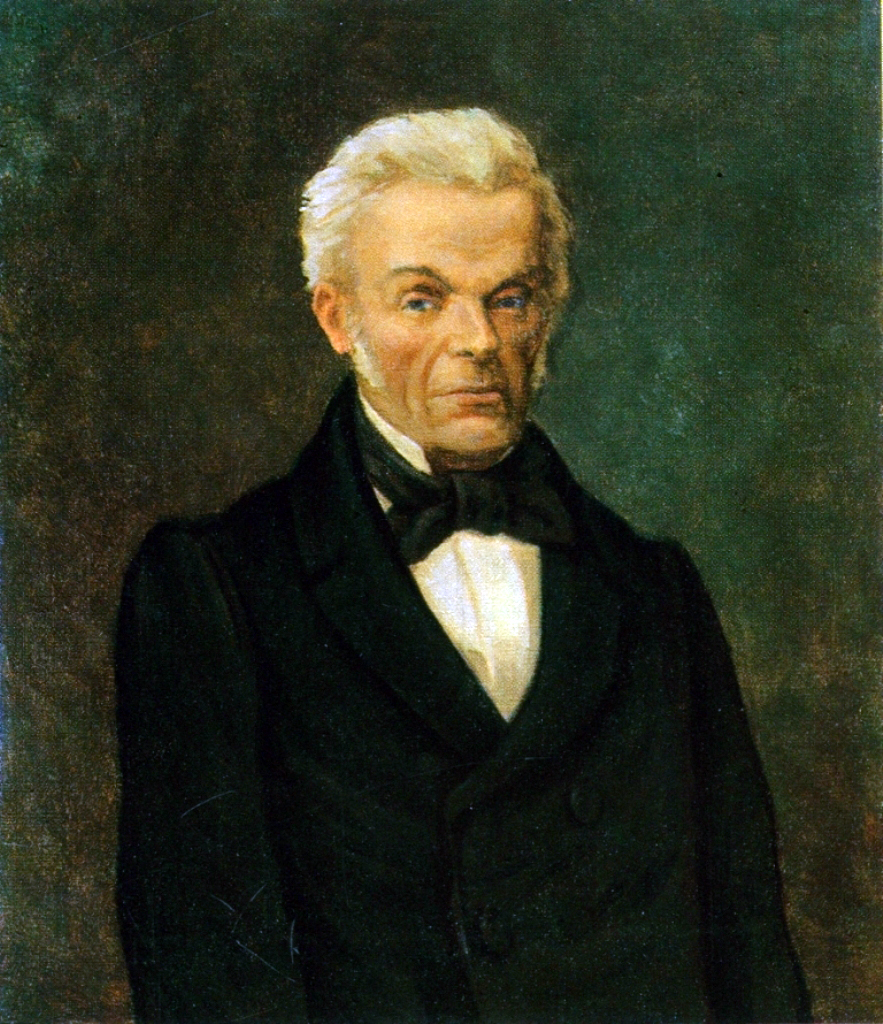
Frederik Holst

- 11 July - Jonas Schanche Kielland, consul and politician (d.1848)
- 24 July - Knud Spødervold, author and lay preacher and leader of the Strong Believers (d.1852)
- 14 August - Frederik Holst, medical doctor (d.1871).
- 15 November - Peder Jensen Fauchald, politician (d.1856)
- 16 November - Olaf Rye, military officer (d.1849)

=== Full date unknown ===
- Gjest Baardsen, outlaw, jail-breaker, non-fiction writer, songwriter and memoirist (died 1849).
- Hans Glad Bloch, politician (d.1865)
- Mikkel Johannesen Borge, politician
- Martin Halvorsen Vee, politician
- Arnt Arntsen Wang, politician

== Deaths ==
- 25 December – Claus Fasting, playwright, literary critic, editor and civil servant (born 1746)
