= 1862 in Norway =

- Centuries: 17th; 18th; 19th; 20th; 21st
- Decades: 1840s; 1850s; 1860s; 1870s; 1880s
- See also: 1862 in Sweden; List of years in Norway

Events in the year 1862 in Norway.

== Incumbents ==
- Monarch: Charles IV.
- First Minister: Frederik Stang

== Events ==
- 23 June – Norway's second railway, Hamar-Grundsetbanen, is opened.
- 3 October – Kongsvingerbanen, Norway's third railway opens between Lillestrøm and Kongsvinger, is opened.

== Arts and literature ==
- The poem Terje Vigen, written by Henrik Ibsen, is published.

== Births ==
=== January to June ===
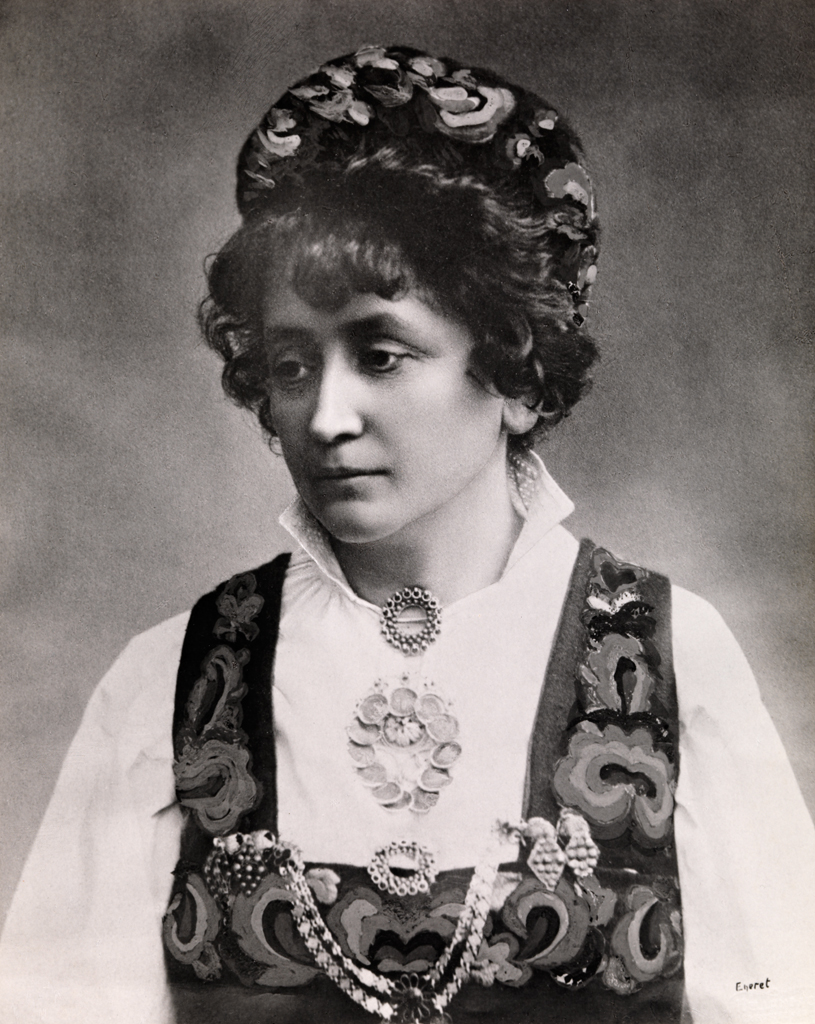
Hulda Garborg

- 22 February – Hulda Garborg, writer, novelist, playwright, poet, folk dancer and theatre instructor (died 1934)
- 14 March – Vilhelm Bjerknes, physicist and meteorologist (died 1951)
- 16 June – Olaf Frydenlund, rifle shooter and Olympic silver medallist (died 1947)
- 25 June – Thomas Wegner Larsen Haaland, politician

=== July to December ===
- 4 August – Albert Gran, Norwegian-American actor (born 1932)
- 15 August – Fernanda Nissen, journalist, literary critic, theatre critic, politician and feminist pioneer (died 1920)
- 21 September – Johan Castberg, jurist and politician (died 1926)
- 23 September – Bernt B. Haugan, Norwegian American minister, politician and temperance leader
- 24 September – Arnt Severin Ulstrup, physician and politician
- 14 November – Ludvig Larsen Kragtorp, physician and politician
- 11 December – Otto Valstad, educator, painter, book illustrator and children's writer (died 1950).

=== Full date unknown ===
- Samuel Balto, explorer and adventurer (died 1922)
- Johan Olaf Bredal, politician and Minister (died 1948)
- Jørgen Brunchorst, politician and Minister (died 1917)
- Anna Bugge, feminist (died 1928)
- Ove Christian Charlot Klykken, politician
- Anders Sandvig, dentist and ethnologist (died 1950)

== Deaths ==
- 30 September – Josephine Thrane, teacher and journalist (born 1820).

=== Full date unknown ===
- Jacobine Gjertz, pianist, composer and writer (born 1819)
- Jon Eriksson Helland, Hardanger fiddle maker (born 1790)
- Knut Mevasstaul, rose painter (born 1785)
- Jørgen Herman Vogt, politician (born 1784)
