= 1786 in Norway =

- Centuries: 16th; 17th; 18th; 19th; 20th
- Decades: 1760s; 1770s; 1780s; 1790s; 1800s
- See also: 1786 in Denmark; List of years in Norway

Events in the year 1786 in Norway.

== Incumbents ==
- Monarch: Christian VII.

== Events ==
- The trade with Iceland is opened to all Danish and Norwegian traders.
- 2 October - Lofthusreisingen begins, a large peasant revolt in South Norway.

== Births ==
- 15 May - Johan Bülow Wamberg, politician, (d.1852)
- 26 May - Engebret Soot, canal engineer (d.1859)
- 29 June - Peder Christian Hersleb Kjerschow, bishop (d.1866)

=== Full date unknown ===
- Samuel Mathiassen Føyn, ship-owner and politician (d.1854)

== Deaths ==
- 18 February – Ludvig Daae, priest and landowner (born 1723).

=== Full date unknown ===
- Anders Olsen, trader, explorer and colonial administrator (born 1718)
