= 1783 in Norway =

- Centuries: 16th; 17th; 18th; 19th; 20th
- Decades: 1760s; 1770s; 1780s; 1790s; 1800s
- See also: 1783 in Denmark; List of years in Norway

Events in the year 1783 in Norway.

== Incumbents ==
- Monarch: Christian VII.

== Events ==
- Jacob Juel is put in house arrest for embezzlement of the state. It would later turn out to be 556,000 Rdlr, the largest embezzlement in Norwegian history.

== Arts and literature ==
- Hegra Church was built.

== Births ==
- 24 January – Herman Løvenskiold Udied 1825)
- 23 December - Lorentz Lange, judge and politician (d.1860)

=== Full date unknown ===
- Christian Holm, politician (d.1855)
- Andreas Samuelsen Vibstad, politician (d.1854)

== Deaths ==
- Simen Fougner, farmer and writer (born 1701).
