= 1784 in Norway =

- Centuries: 17th; 18th; 19th; 20th
- Decades: 1760s; 1770s; 1780s; 1790s; 1800s
- See also: 1784 in Denmark; List of years in Norway

Events in the year 1784 in Norway.

== Incumbents ==
- Monarch: Christian VII.

== Events ==
- 29 January – Joachim Geelmuyden and his family were ennobled under the name Gyldenkrantz.
- 30 March – 18 June – The Sagbadre War, in present-day Ghana.
- Georgernes Verft, a shipyard in Bergen, was established.
- Jacob Juel escapes imprisonment at Akershus Castle, and flees to Sweden.

== Arts and literature ==
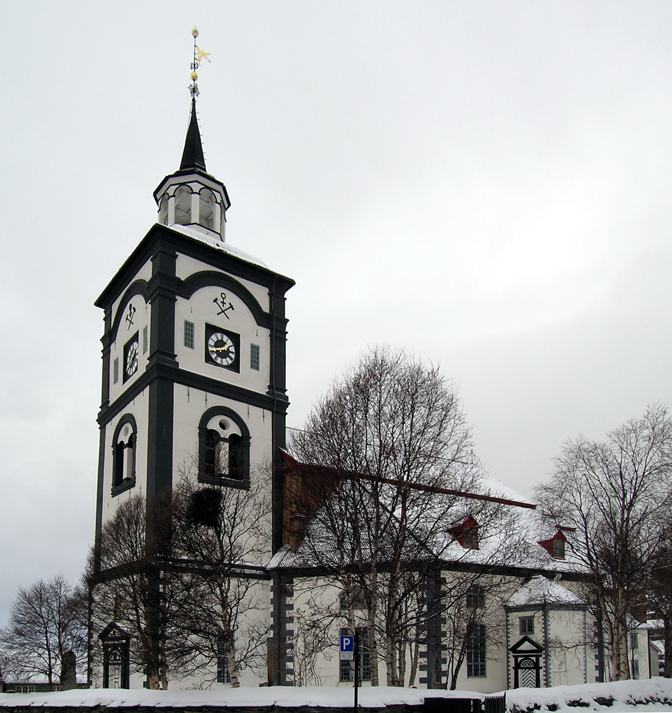
Røros Church

- Røros Church was built.
- Torsken Church was built.

== Births ==
- 7 March – Svend Borchmann Hersleb, professor of theology and politician (d.1836)
- 28 April – Jørgen von Cappelen Knudtzon, businessman and patron of the arts (d.1854)
- 12 June – Paul Andreas Kaald, navy officer and businessman (d.1867)
- 11 July – Olaus Michael Schmidt, judge and politician (d.1851)
- 26 September – Christopher Hansteen, astronomer and physicist (d.1873)

=== Full date unknown ===
- Michael Sevald Aamodt, politician (d.1859)
- Christian Ulrik Kastrup, jurist, military officer and politician (d.1850)
- Jørgen Herman Vogt, politician (d.1862)
- Tørris Johnsen Worum, politician (d.1834)
