= 1787 in Norway =

- Centuries: 17th; 18th; 19th; 20th
- Decades: 1760s; 1770s; 1780s; 1790s; 1800s
- See also: 1787 in Denmark; List of years in Norway

Events in the year 1787 in Norway.

== Incumbents ==
- Monarch: Christian VII.

== Events ==
- 15 March - Lofthusreisingen ends with the arrest of Christian Jensen Lofthuus.

== Arts and literature ==
- Det Dramatiske Selskab in Christiansand is founded.

== Births ==
- 11 January - Nils Vibe Stockfleth, missionary (d.1866)

=== Full date unknown ===
- Sjur Hansen Halkjeldsvik, politician (d.1868)
- Nicolai Johan Lohmann Krog, politician and Minister (d.1856)
- Johan Frederik Knudzen Nødbæk, politician
- Johan Henrik Rye, jurist and politician (d.1868)
- Jørgen Fredrik Spørck, military officer and politician (d.1866)

== Deaths ==
=== Full date unknown ===
- Jens Schanche, postmaster (born 1717).
