= 1866 in Norway =

- Centuries: 17th; 18th; 19th; 20th; 21st
- Decades: 1840s; 1850s; 1860s; 1870s; 1880s
- See also: 1866 in Sweden; List of years in Norway

Events in the year 1866 in Norway.

== Incumbents ==
- Monarch: Charles IV.
- First Minister: Frederik Stang

== Events ==
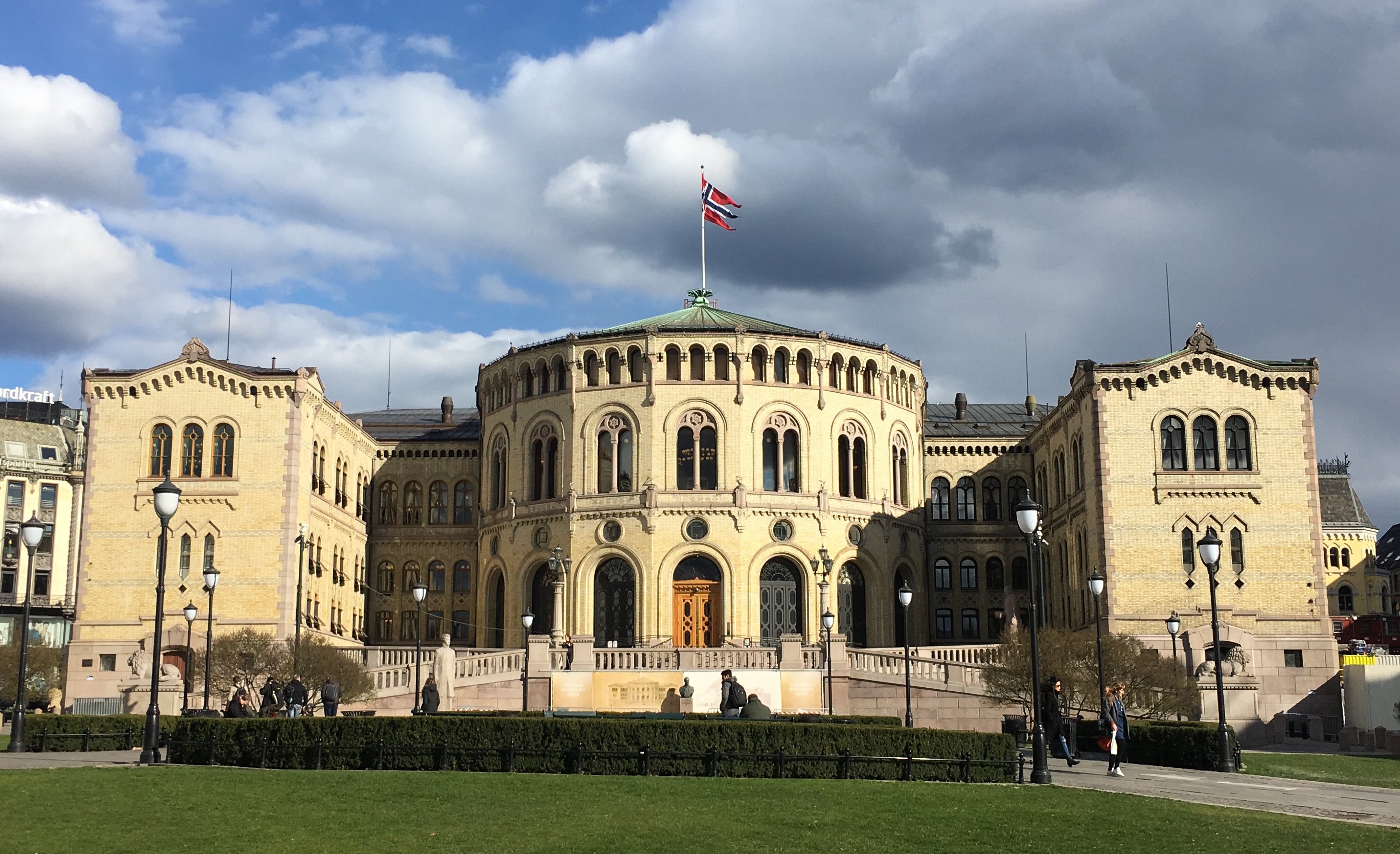
The official inauguration of the Parliament of Norway Building

- 5 March – The official inauguration of the Parliament of Norway Building (Norwegian: Stortingsbygningen).
- 12–13 July – The town of Drammen is destroyed by fire, with the flames visible from Christiana (now Oslo) 36 km (22 mi) away.
- The town of Kopervik is founded.

== Arts and literature ==
- Erika Nissen, pianist, makes her concert debut in Berlin.

== Births ==
=== January to June ===
- 5 January – Johan Gjøstein, educator, newspaper editor and politician (died 1935).
- 21 January – Olaus Alvestad, educator and newspaper editor (died 1903)
- 22 January – Sigurd Høst, educator (died 1939).
- 15 March – Johan Vaaler, inventor (died 1910)
- 25 April – Aasulv Olsen Bryggesaa, politician and Minister (died 1922)
- 29 April – Kristian Prestgard, editor of Decorah-Posten (died 1946)
- 10 May – Thorolf Holmboe, painter (died 1935)
- 24 June – Peter Karl Holmesland, jurist and politician (died 1933)

=== July to December ===
- 10 July – Sigurd Eldegard, actor and playwright (died 1950).
- 29 July – Jens Zetlitz Monrad Kielland, architect (died 1926)
- 12 August – Johan Opsahl, politician
- 2 September – August Herman Halvorsen, politician (died 1929)
- 13 September – Ole Østmo, rifle shooter and Olympic medallist (died 1923)
- 28 October – Peter Collett Solberg, businessperson and politician (died 1934)
- 1 November – Betzy Kjelsberg, politician and feminist (died 1950)
- 29 November – Johan Friele, sailor and Olympic gold medallist (died 1927)
- 2 December – Ingvald Anker Andersen, politician

=== Full date unknown ===
- Simon Christian Hammer, writer and journalist (died 1932)
- Jenova Martin, suffragist and writer (died 1937)
- Sigbjørn Obstfelder, writer (died 1900)

== Deaths ==
- 20 March – Rikard Nordraak, composer (born 1842)
- 26 April - Nils Vibe Stockfleth, missionary (born 1787)
- 24 November – Peder Christian Hersleb Kjerschow, bishop (born 1786)

=== Full date unknown ===
- Nicolai Benjamin Cappelen, jurist and politician (born 1795)
- Louise Brun, actor (born 1831)
- Conradine Birgitte Dunker, socialite and writer (born 1780)
- Ole Paulssøn Haagenstad, politician (born 1775)
- Jørgen Fredrik Spørck, military officer and politician (born 1787)
