= 1785 in Norway =

- Centuries: 16th; 17th; 18th; 19th; 20th
- Decades: 1760s; 1770s; 1780s; 1790s; 1800s
- See also: 1785 in Denmark; List of years in Norway

Events in the year 1785 in Norway.

== Incumbents ==
- Monarch: Christian VII.

== Arts and literature ==
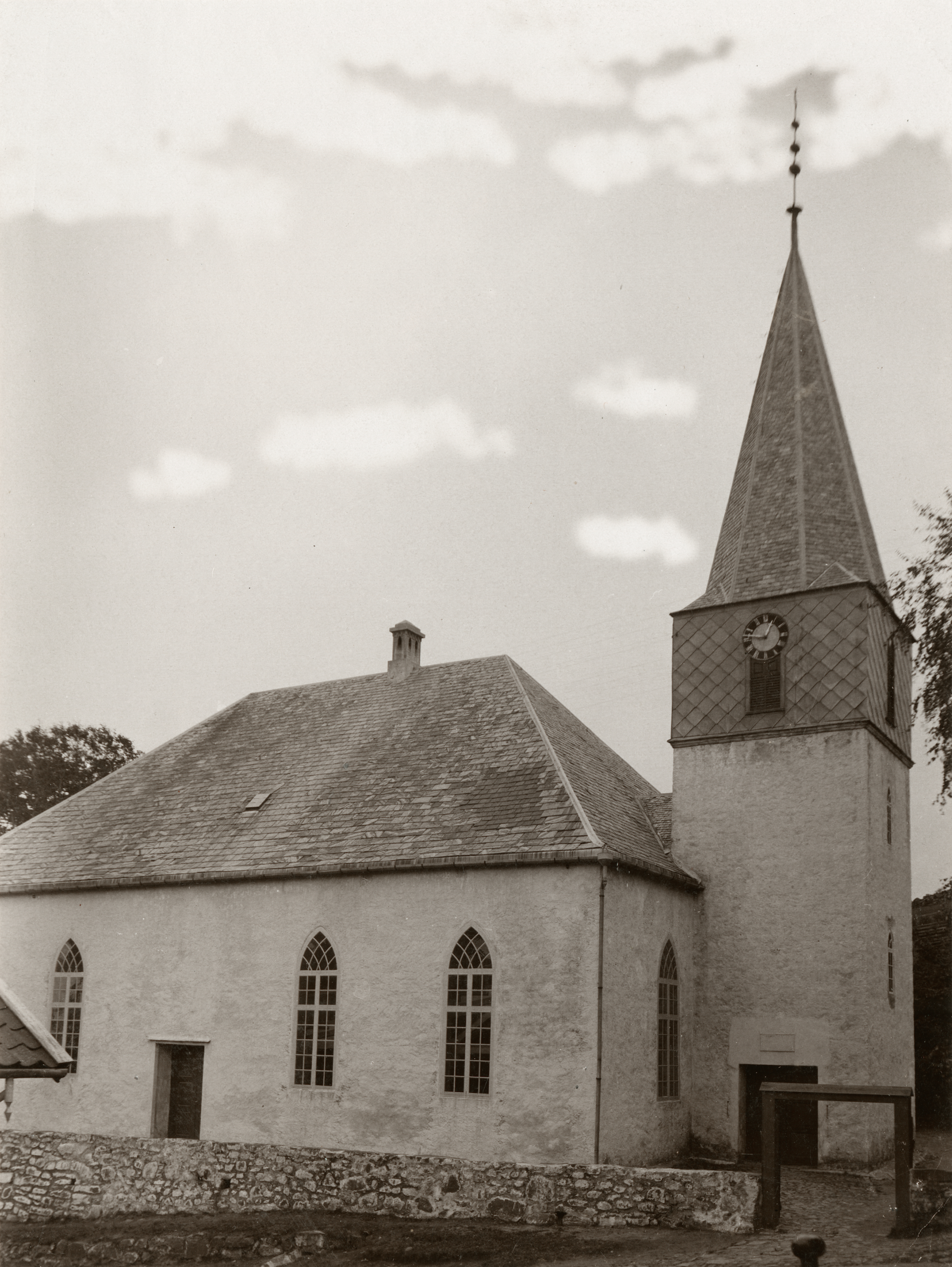
Frelseren Church (1900)

- 12 January - The first public library in Norway is opened.
- Frelseren Church was built.
- In an anonymous work, Christian Kølle introduced the written feminine grammatical gender in Norway.

== Births ==
- 1 August - Georg Jacob Bull, jurist and politician (d.1854)

=== Full date unknown ===
- Gustav Peter Blom, politician (d.1869)
- Michel Nielsen Grendahl, politician (d.1849)
- Knut Mevasstaul, rose painter (d.1862)

== Deaths ==
- 29 December - Johan Herman Wessel, poet (b.1742)
