= 1855 in Norway =

- Centuries: 17th; 18th; 19th; 20th; 21st
- Decades: 1830s; 1840s; 1850s; 1860s; 1870s
- See also: 1855 in Sweden; List of years in Norway

Events in the year 1855 in Norway.

== Incumbents ==
- Monarch: Oscar I.
- First Minister: Nicolai Krog

== Events ==
- 1 February - The town of Haugesund is founded.
- 25 June – Marcus Thrane and 132 other members of the Labour Union was sentenced for crimes against the state security.
- 31 December – Population Census: 1,490,047 inhabitants in Norway.

== Notable births ==
- 23 January – Edvard Hagerup Bull, judge and politician (died 1938)
- 31 January – Karl Uchermann, painter and illustrator (died 1940).
- 11 February – Erik Werenskiold, painter and illustrator (died 1938)
- 21 March – Fredrik Georg Gade, physician (died 1933)
- 10 April – Jacob Fjelde, Norwegian-American sculptor (died 1896)
- 28 May – Ole Amundsen Buslett, Norwegian-American author, newspaperman, and politician (died 1924)
- 24 July – Nils Claus Ihlen, engineer, politician and Minister (died 1925)
- 5 November – Einar Wang, politician (died 1939)
- 25 November – Anton Ræder, educator and historian (died 1941).

=== Full date unknown ===
- Lars Kristian Abrahamsen, politician and Minister (died 1921)
- Anders Bergene, businessperson (died 1920)
- Hartvig Sverdrup Eckhoff, architect (died 1928)
- Nils Hansteen, painter (died 1912)
- Gjert Holsen, politician (died 1921)
- Ambrotius Olsen Lindvig, politician and Minister (died 1946)
- Anthon B. Nilsen, businessman, politician and author (died 1936)
- Axel Paulsen, speed skater and figure skater (died 1938)
- Ivar Bergersen Sælen, politician and Minister (died 1923)
- Karl Anton Sanderød, politician (died 1924)

== Notable deaths ==
- 26 July - Ole Paus, ship's captain, shipowner and land owner (born 1766)
- 15 December – Fredrik Meltzer, businessman and politician (born 1779).

=== Full date unknown ===
- Olea Crøger, folk music collector (born 1801)
- Christian Holm, politician (born 1783)
