= Thomas Haaland =

Thomas Haaland may refer to:

- Thomas Vigner Christiansen Haaland, Norwegian politician
- Thomas Wegner Larsen Haaland, Norwegian politician, banker, and farmer
