= 1852 in Norway =

- Centuries: 17th; 18th; 19th; 20th; 21st
- Decades: 1830s; 1840s; 1850s; 1860s; 1870s
- See also: 1852 in Sweden; List of years in Norway

Events in the year 1852 in Norway.

== Incumbents ==
- Monarch: Oscar I.
- First Minister: Nicolai Krog

== Events ==
- The Sami revolt in Guovdageaidnu.
- The town of Hønefoss is founded.

== Arts and literature ==
- The construction of Oscarshall Palace was finished.

== Births ==
- 10 February – Svend Borchmann Hersleb Vogt, jurist and politician (died 1923)
- 13 August – Christian Krohg, painter, illustrator, author and journalist (died 1925)
- 4 September – Eilif Peterssen, painter (died 1928)
- 5 September – Hans Henrik Reusch, geologist (died 1922)
- 23 December – Jens Ludvig Andersen Aars, politician (died 1919)

=== Full date unknown ===
- Erik Enge, politician and Minister (died 1933)
- Gunnar Olavsson Helland, Hardanger fiddle maker (died 1938)

== Deaths ==
- 20 March – Knud Spødervold, author and lay preacher and leader of the Strong Believers (born 1791)
- 8 June – Johan Bülow Wamberg, politician, (born 1786)
- 3 July – Jonas Schanche Kielland, consul and politician (born 1791)
- 24 September – Prince Gustaf, Duke of Uppland, duke (born 1827)
- 12 October – Haagen Ludvig Bergh, politician (born 1809)

=== Full date missing ===
- Maria Nubsen, midwife (born c.1780).
