= 1789 in Norway =

- Centuries: 16th; 17th; 18th; 19th; 20th
- Decades: 1760s; 1770s; 1780s; 1790s; 1800s
- See also: 1789 in Denmark; List of years in Norway

Events in the year 1789 in Norway.

== Incumbents ==
- Monarch: Christian VII.

== Events ==
- 20 February – Hanging as a capital punishment was abolished.
- July – The flood Storofsen struck eastern Norway.
- 9 July – Theater War part of the Russo-Swedish War (1788–1790): Denmark-Norway agreed to cease active engagement in the conflict. A statement of neutrality was issued by Denmark-Norway, not a formal peace treaty and Denmark-Norway leaves the war.
- 17 July:
  - The town of Hammerfest was founded.
  - The town of Vardø was founded.
- 12 November – The Norwegian army retreated from Bohuslen back to Norway. During the retreat, the Norwegian army lost 1,500-3,000 men to hunger, disease, poor sanitary conditions, and exposure to continual autumn rainfall

== Births ==
- 29 January - Fredrik Riis, civil servant (d.1845)
- 19 March – Peter Christian Knudtzon, businessman (died 1864)
- 2 November - Karen Wedel-Jarlsberg, courtier (d.1849)

=== Full date unknown ===
- Ole Johannesen Staff, politician

== Deaths ==
- 1 August - Peder Hjort, businessperson (born 1715)

=== Full date unknown ===
- Eric Gustaf Tunmarck, painter (born 1729).
