= Kølle =

Kølle is a Norwegian surname. Notable people with the surname include:

- Christian Kølle (1736–1814), Norwegian educator
- Catharine Hermine Kølle (1788–1859), Norwegian adventurer and painter

== See also ==
- Kolle
- Kölle
