= 1848 in Norway =

- Centuries: 17th; 18th; 19th; 20th; 21st
- Decades: 1820s; 1830s; 1840s; 1850s; 1860s
- See also: 1848 in Sweden; List of years in Norway

Events in the year 1848 in Norway.

== Incumbents ==
- Monarch: Oscar I.
- First Minister: Nicolai Krog

== Events ==
- Ålesund received city rights.
- 10–12 March – March riots: after the newspaper Morgenbladet publishes news of the French Revolution of 1848, some 100 youths gather to make catcalls outside the house of the newspaper's editor, Adolf Bredo Stabell, in Christiania. Counter-demonstrations, in support of the French revolution and against a local ban on trade on Sundays, involved up to 3–4,000 people and led to clashes with the police and the military. Some 70 people were arrested.
- 21 May – Fatal accident in Vanse Church where eight people were killed and several were injured. The accident occurred when there arose panic in the crowded church and several people were trampled to death.
- 27 December – Marcus Thrane founded Drammens arbeiderforening (Drammen Labour Union).
- Christiania Bank was founded.
- Fred. Olsen & Co. was founded.

== Arts and literature ==
- Bridal Procession on the Hardangerfjord was painted.

== Notable births ==
- 3 February – Jørgen Løvland, politician and Prime Minister of Norway (d. 1922)
- 1 March – Caroline Schytte Jensen, writer and composer (died 1935).
- 2 May – Hans Gabriel Nissen Buck, physician and politician (d. 1924)
- 17 May – Erik Jørgensen, master gunsmith (d. 1896)
- 21 May – Wilhelmine Gulowsen, writer (d. 1899)
- 27 May – Johan Bøgh, museum director and art historian (d. 1933)
- 12 June – Nordahl Rolfsen, writer, educationalist and teacher, journalist, translator and speaker (d. 1928)
- 20 June – Jens Carl Peter Brandt, businessperson and politician (d. 1912)
- 19 September – Gunnar Knudsen, politician and twice Prime Minister of Norway (d. 1928)
- 22 November – Lars Holst, journalist, newspaper editor and politician (d. 1915).
- 16 December – Georg Sverdrup, theologian and educator (d. 1907)
- 21 December – Viggo Ullmann, educator and politician (d. 1910)
- 23 December – Ingeborg Belling, actress (d. 1927)

=== Full date unknown ===
- Hjalmar Hjorth Boyesen, author and college professor in America (d.1895)
- Holm Hansen Munthe, architect (d.1898)
- Kristian Mauritz Mustad, politician (d.1913)
- Henrik Nissen, architect (d.1915)
- Andreas Lauritz Thune, engineer and businessman (d.1920)

== Notable deaths ==
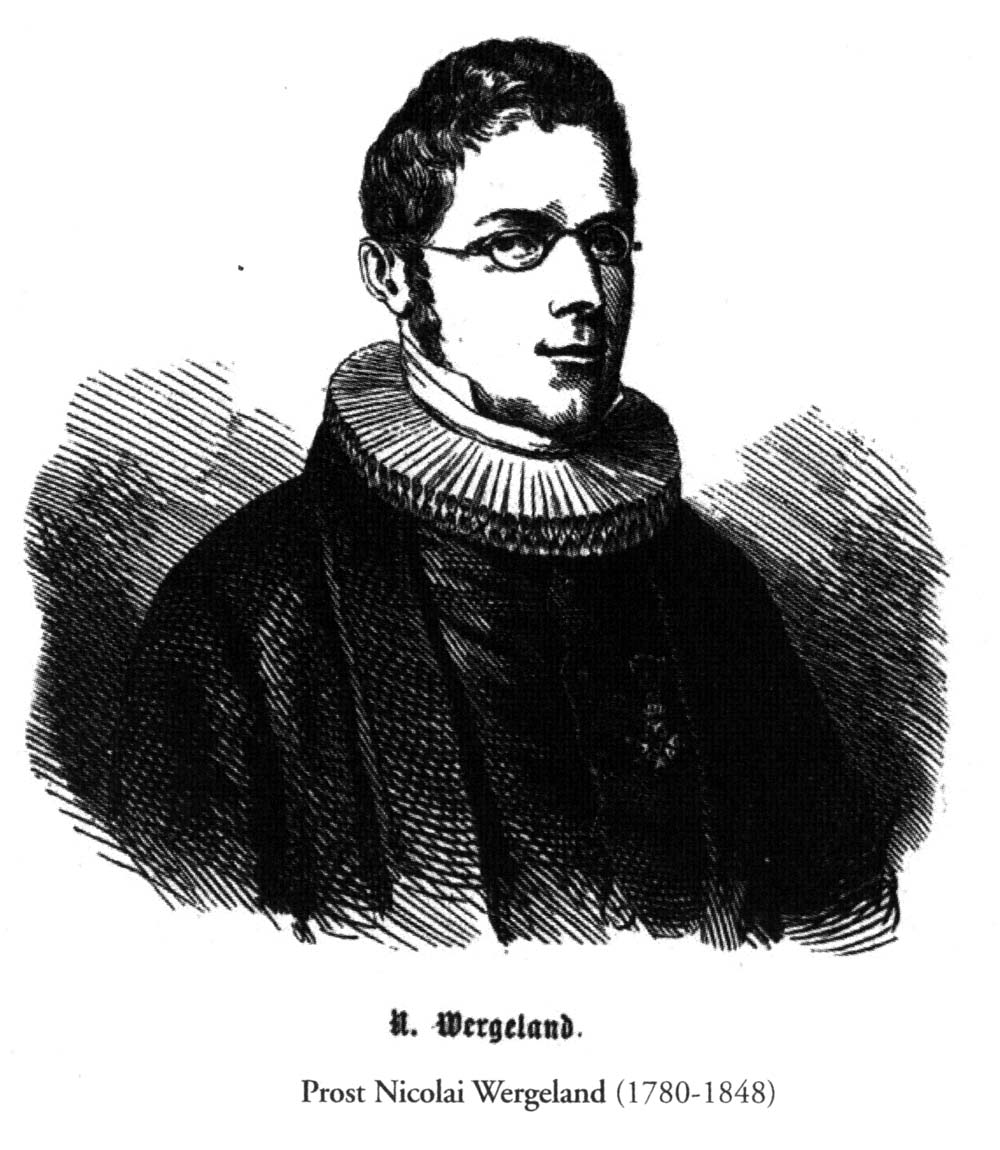
Nicolai Wergeland

- 2 January – Frederik Motzfeldt, politician (born 1779).
- 5 February – Hans Munk, physician (born 1770)
- 25 March – Nicolai Wergeland, priest, writer and politician (born 1780).
- 30 March – Jonas Anton Hielm, jurist and politician (born 1782)
- 20 December – Ole Høiland, burglar and jail-breaker (born 1797)
- 24 December – Hans Nicolai Lange, priest and politician (born 1795)

=== Full date unknown ===
- Ole Hersted Schjøtt, clergyman and politician (born 1805)
