= Wamberg (surname) =

Wamberg is a Danish surname. Notable people with the surname include:

- Johan Bülow Wamberg (1786–1852), Norwegian politician
- Niels Wamberg (1920–2016), Danish coxswain
- Helge Wamberg (born 1888–1959), Danish journalist
