= 1859 in Norway =

- Centuries: 17th; 18th; 19th; 20th; 21st
- Decades: 1830s; 1840s; 1850s; 1860s; 1870s
- See also: 1859 in Sweden; List of years in Norway

Events in the year 1859 in Norway.

== Incumbents ==
- Monarch: Oscar I (until 8 July); then Charles IV.
- First Minister: Hans Christian Petersen

== Events ==
- March–23 June – Parliamentary elections are held, resulting in 47 seats won by farmers, sheriffs, church singers, and teachers; 33 by civil servants; and 37 by individuals from other professions.
- 8 July – Charles XV succeeds his father Oscar I of Sweden and Norway (as Charles IV).

== Notable births ==
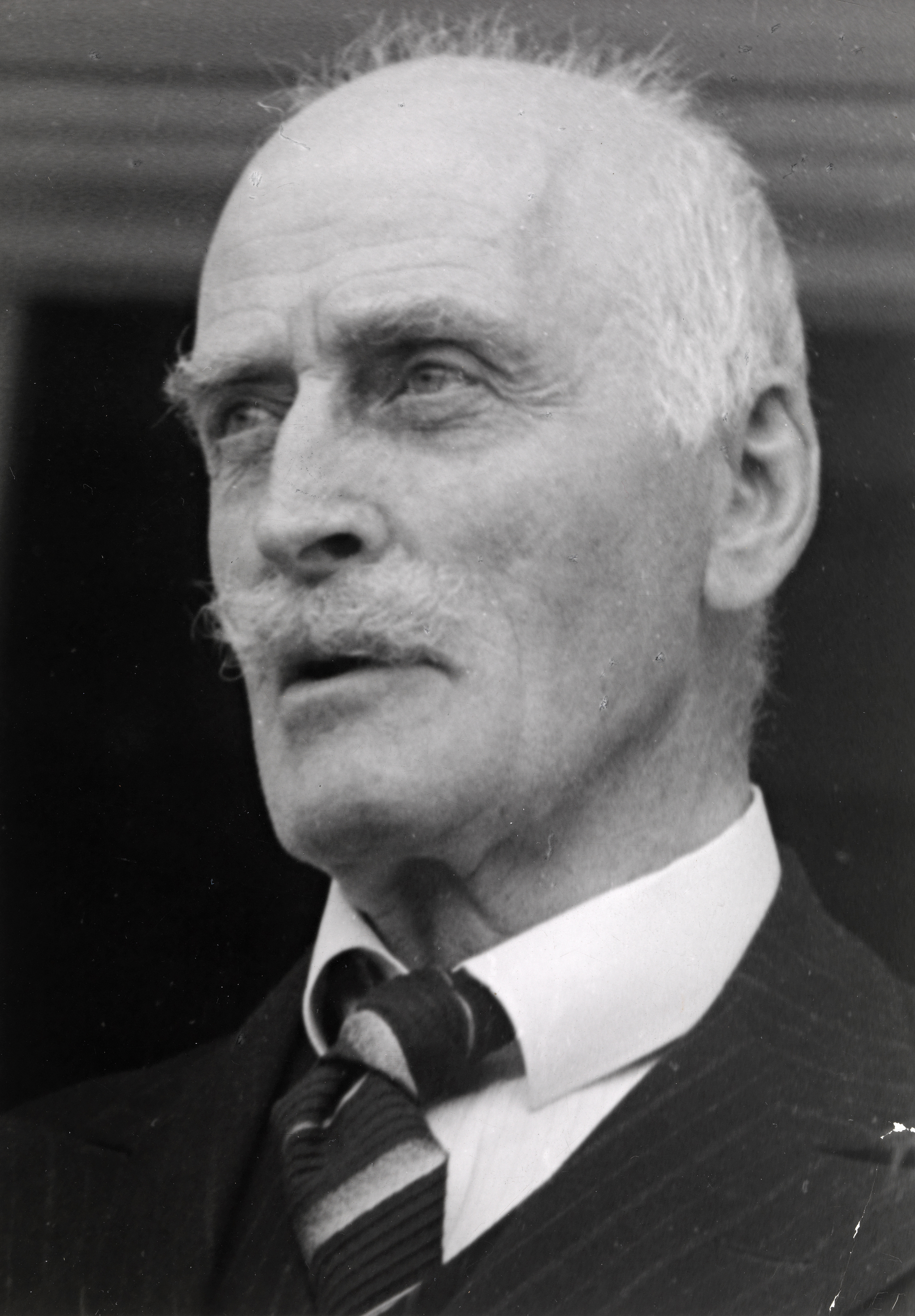
Knut Hamsun

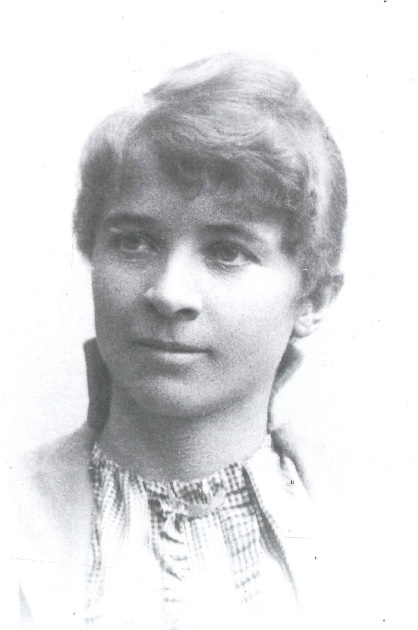
Minda Ramm

- 28 January – Ambrosia Tønnesen, sculptor (died 1948).
- 5 April – Harald Smedal, politician and Minister (died 1911)
- 15 May – Olav Bjørkum, politician (died 1936)
- 23 June – Daniel Isaachsen, physicist (died 1940)
- 29 June – Ragnvald Bødtker, engineer (died 1946)
- 30 July – Christian Sparre, politician (died 1940)
- 4 August – Knut Hamsun, author, Nobel Prize in Literature laureate (died 1952)
- 29 August – Thomas Vigner Christiansen Haaland, politician (died 1913)
- 7 October – Thorleif Frederik Schjelderup, businessperson (died 1931)
- 11 November – Belle Gunness, serial killer
- 15 November – Bjørn Bjørnson, actor and theatre director (died 1942)
- 15 November – Christopher Hornsrud, politician and Prime Minister of Norway (died 1960)
- 17 November – Fredrik Stang Lund, politician and Minister (died 1922)
- 23 December – Sigurd Ibsen, author and politician (died 1930)
- 27 December – Bernt Holtsmark, politician (died 1941)
- 27 December – Minda Ramm, novelist, translator and literary critic (died 1924).

== Notable deaths ==
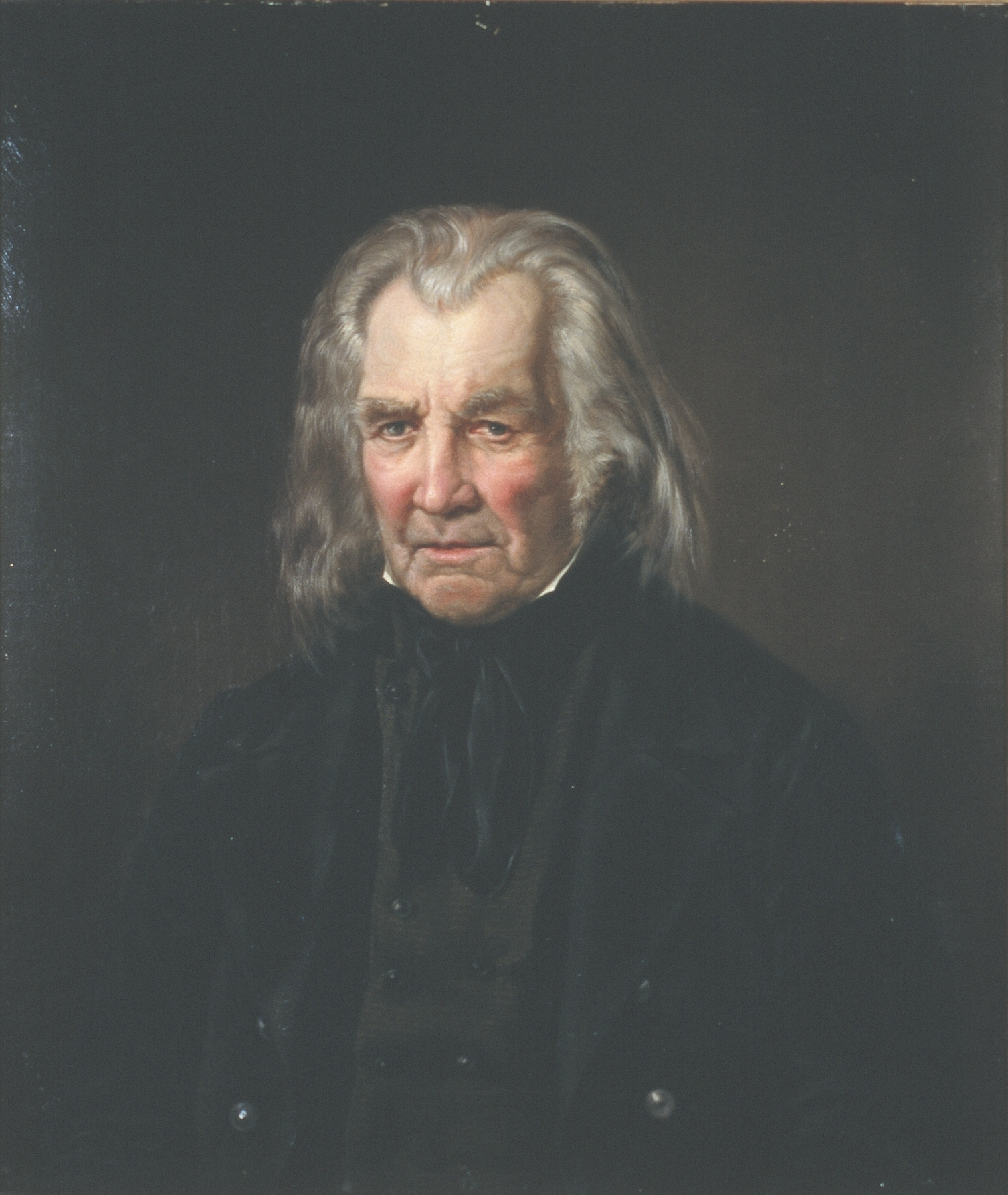
Ole Rasmussen Apeness

- 14 February – Ole Rasmussen Apeness, district sheriff, soldier, and farmer (b. 1765)
- 26 May – Engebret Soot, canal engineer (born 1786)
- 7 June – Lauritz Dorenfeldt Jenssen, businessperson (born 1801)
- 27 August – Catharine Hermine Kølle, adventurer and painter (born 1788)
- 29 October – Nils Landmark, jurist, farmer and politician (born 1775)
- 19 December – Niels Arntzen Sem, politician (born 1782)
- 23 December – Even Hammer Holmboe, politician (born 1792)

=== Full date unknown ===
- Michael Sevald Aamodt, politician (born 1784)
