= Staff =

Staff may refer to:

== Pole ==
- Walking staff, an instrument used for balance when walking
- Staff, a weapon used in stick-fighting
  - Quarterstaff, a European pole weapon
- Staff of office, a pole that indicates a position
- Staff (railway signalling), a token authorizing a locomotive driver to use a particular stretch of single track
- Level staff, also called levelling rod, a graduated rod for comparing heights
- Fire staff, a staff of wood or metal and Kevlar, used for fire dancing and performance
- Flagstaff, on which a flag is flown
- Scout staff, a shoulder-high pole traditionally carried by Boy Scouts, for various uses in emergencies
- Pilgrim's staff, a walking stick used by pilgrims during their pilgrimages

== Military ==
- Staff (military), the organ of military command and planning
- USS Staff (AM-114), a United States Navy minesweeper
- Smart Target-Activated Fire and Forget (XM943 STAFF), an American-made experimental 120×570mm NATO tank gun shell

== People ==
- Staff (name), a list of people with either the surname or nickname

== Other uses ==
- People in employment within any organization, for instance:
  - civil staff or civilian staff, referring to an organisation's civilian support staff, often in an otherwise uniformed organisation such as a police service. One notable example is the civil staff of the Metropolitan Police Service in London
  - Academic staff in a school, college, or university
- Staff (music), a set of five horizontal lines upon which notes are placed in written music notation
- Staff (building material) (short for staffieren), an artificial stone product used as ornament
- Jack Staff, British superhero
- Staffordshire, a county in England
- Staff, a nickname for the Staffordshire Bull Terrier

== See also ==
- Celastrus, a shrub genus commonly known as the staff vine or staff tree
- Staphylococcus, often shortened to "staph", bacteria which can cause infection
