= Christian Holm =

Christian Holm may refer to:

- Christian Holm (Norwegian politician) (1783–1855)
- Christian Holm (painter) (1804–1846), Danish animal painter
- Christian Hintze Holm (born 1964), Norwegian politician
- Christian Holm (Swedish politician) (born 1976)
- Christian Holm (Scouting)
