= Essendrop =

Essendrop is a surname. Notable people with the surname include:

- Bernhard Ludvig Essendrop (1812–1891), Norwegian politician and priest
- Carl Peter Parelius Essendrop (1818–1893), Norwegian bishop and politician
- Jens Essendrop (1723–1801), Norwegian clergyman and writer
- Ulla Essendrop (born 1976), Indian-born Danish television presenter
