= Kolle =

Kolle is both a surname and a given name. Notable people with the name include:

Surname:

- Andy Kolle (born 1982), American boxer
- Helmut Kolle (1899–1931), German painter
- Jorge Kolle Cueto (died 2007), Bolivian politician
- Oswalt Kolle (1928–2010), German sex educator
- Rikkie Kollé (born 2001), Dutch model

Given name:

- Kirsti Kolle Grøndahl (born 1943), Norwegian politician

== See also ==
- Kölle
- Kølle
