= Johann Friedrich von und zu Mansbach =

Hessian-Danish military officer (1744–1803)

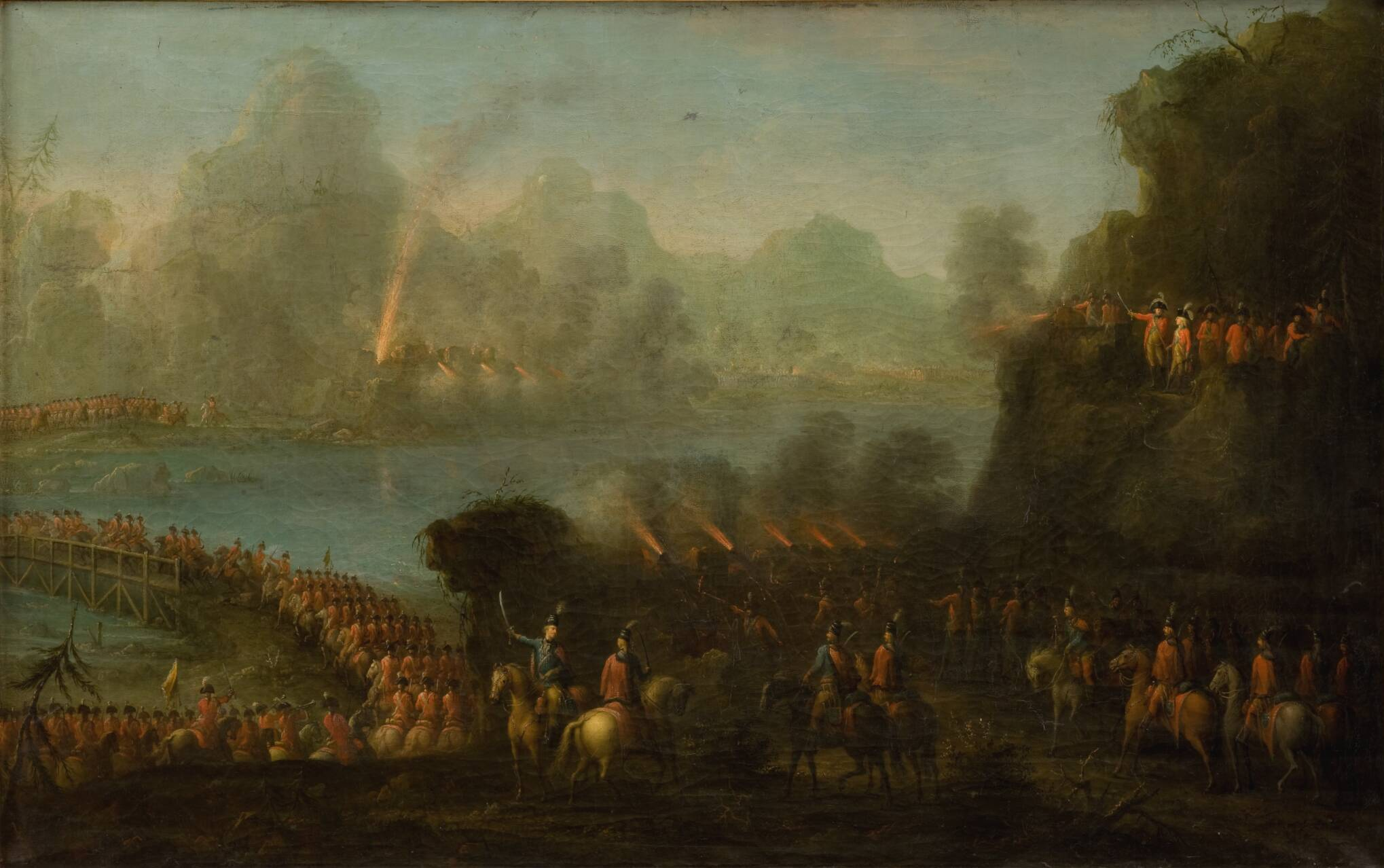
1790 painting of the Battle of Kvistrum, with Mansbach possibly depicted

Johann Friedrich von und zu Mansbach (26 October 1744 – 15 March 1803) was a Hessian-Danish military officer. He spent much of his career in Norway, participated in the Theater War, and commanded Fredriksten Fortress from 1790 to his death, reaching the rank of lieutenant general.

He was born in Mansbach as a son of Friedrich Wilhelm von und zu Mansbach and Sophia Bernstein. In 1787 he married Isabella von Oldenburg (1769–1855), a daughter of Adam Christoph von Oldenburg and Maria de Schöller, and a former member of Désirée Clary's court. Their son Carl von und zu Mansbach became a notable military officer and diplomat, and one of Carl's daughters married judge and politician Otto Joachim Løvenskiold.

Johann Friedrich von und zu Mansbach was a military officer in Hesse-Kassel before serving Denmark. In April 1776 he became a naturalized Danish citizen. He served as leader of Dronningens Livregiment in Denmark from November 1772, with the rank of lieutenant colonel. He became chamberlain (kammerherre) in April 1774. He was promoted further to colonel in May 1783, major general in July 1788 and lieutenant general in April 1801.

From May 1783 he was stationed in Norway. From March 1787 to his death he led the Sønnenfjelske gevorbne Infanteriregiment, and when the Theater War broke out in 1788 he led the Fourth Field Brigade. From September 1790 he doubled as regiment leader and commander of Fredriksten Fortress. In 1801, during the War of the Second Coalition, Mansbach was placed in command of troops at Vestfold to resist a potential British attack, which did not occur. Mansbach died in March 1803 at Fredriksten.
