= Valborg Seeberg =

Norwegian author (1851–1929)

- Born: Valborg Sissener; 16 November 1851; Christiania, Norway
- Died: 1929 (aged 77–78)
- Spouse: Franz Gustav Seeberg (m. 1876)
- Children: 10
- Relatives: Wilhelmine Gulowsen (sister)
- Writing career
- Pen name: En badegjæst; Palle; V.Sg

Valborg Seeberg (16 November 1851 – 1929) was a Norwegian author.

== Early life ==
Valborg Sissener was born on 16 November 1851 in Christiania (now Oslo) to Captain Johan Peter Brandt Sissener and his first wife Oline Riiser. She was the sister of writer, editor and translator Wilhelmine Gulowsen. On 12 December 1876, she married Captain Franz Gustav Seeberg. Together they had 10 children, including businessman and sportsman Christen Seeberg.

== Career ==
Seeberg published a modest number of publications from 1908 to 1909, under pseudonyms such as En badegjæst, Palle and V.Sg. In 1908, she published Badetyper og Stemninger which describes the environment of Sandefjord Spa. The following year she also published Cirkus-Artisten.

Seeberg died in 1929.
