= 1729 in Sweden =

Events from the year 1729 in Sweden

== Incumbents ==
- Monarch - Frederick I

== Events ==
- April - Sweden and Saxony finally resume peaceful connections with each other after the Great Nordic War.

== Births ==
- 31 January – Pehr Löfling, botanist (died 1756)
- 1 May – Eric Gustaf Tunmarck, painter (died 1789).
- 11 September – Jacob Johan Anckarström the Elder, nobleman (died 1777)
- 21 October – Bengt Andersson Qvist, chemist and mineralogist (died 1799)

== Deaths ==
- 29 April – Ingela Gathenhielm, privateer (born 1692)
- 20 August – Gunnila Grubb, songwriter (born 1692)
- 22 October – Anna Maria Ehrenstrahl, painter (born 1666)
