= Isak Kobro Collett =

Norwegian politician (1867–1911)

Isak Kobro Collett (19 January 1867 – 2 September 1911) was a Norwegian politician for the Conservative Party.

== Personal life ==
He was born as the second son of Thomas Collett (1835–1898) and Sine Kobro (1843–1920), in Lindaas Municipality where his father was stationed as a county physician. He had one older and two younger brothers. His great-grandfather was Jonas Collett, among the founding fathers of the Norwegian Constitution.

He married Jenny Augusta Arntzen (1875–1951). The couple had six children, some of whom died young.

== Career ==
He took secondary education in Drammen, and graduated as cand.med. in 1894. He was appointed acting county physician (equivalent to Medical Officer for Health) in Modum in 1898. He started a private practice in Eidsvold in 1898, but again became county physician, this time in Ullensaker from 1905.

Involved in politics, he was a member of the municipal council of Eidsvold Municipality, and even deputy mayor for some time.

He served as a deputy representative to the Norwegian Parliament during the term 1910–1912, representing the constituency Øvre Romerike. He did meet in the place of Johan Opsahl, but died midway during the term.
