= Snarøya =

Coordinates: 59.88027°N 10.6117°E

- Village
- Interactive map of Snarøya
- Country: Norway
- Region: Østlandet
- County: Akershus
- Time zone: UTC+01:00 (CET)
  - Summer (DST): UTC+02:00 (CEST)

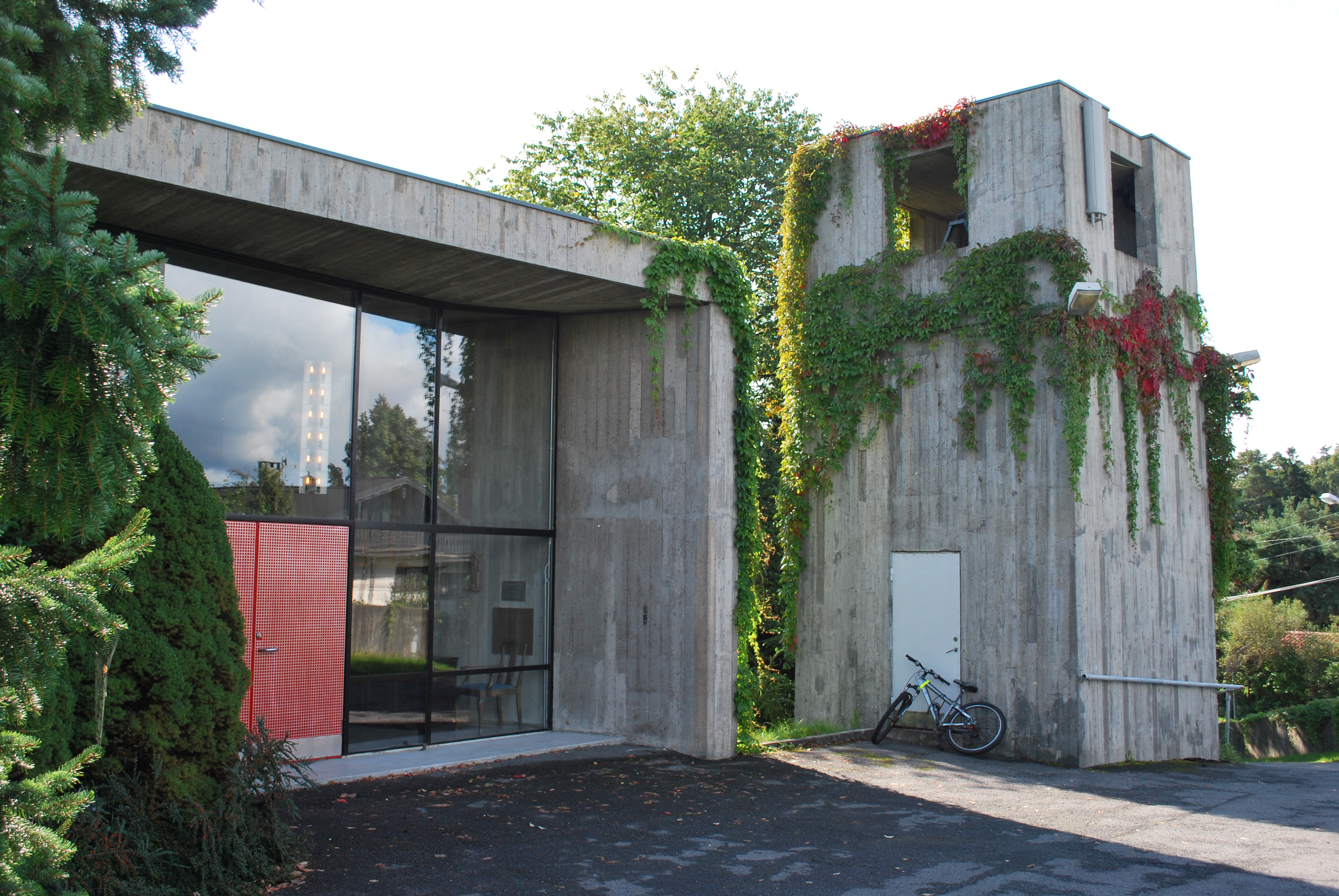
Church

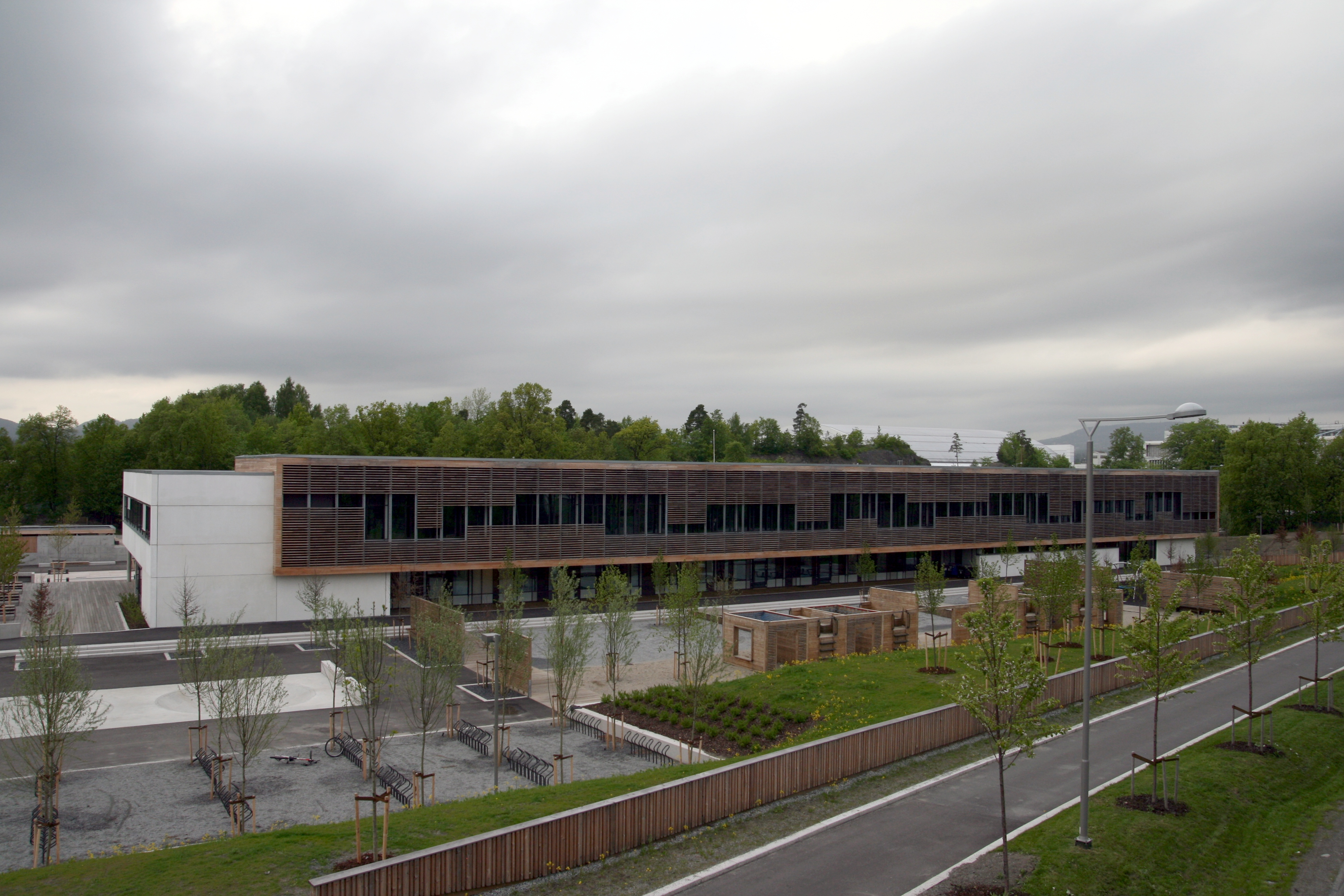
Secondary school at Hundsund grendesenter

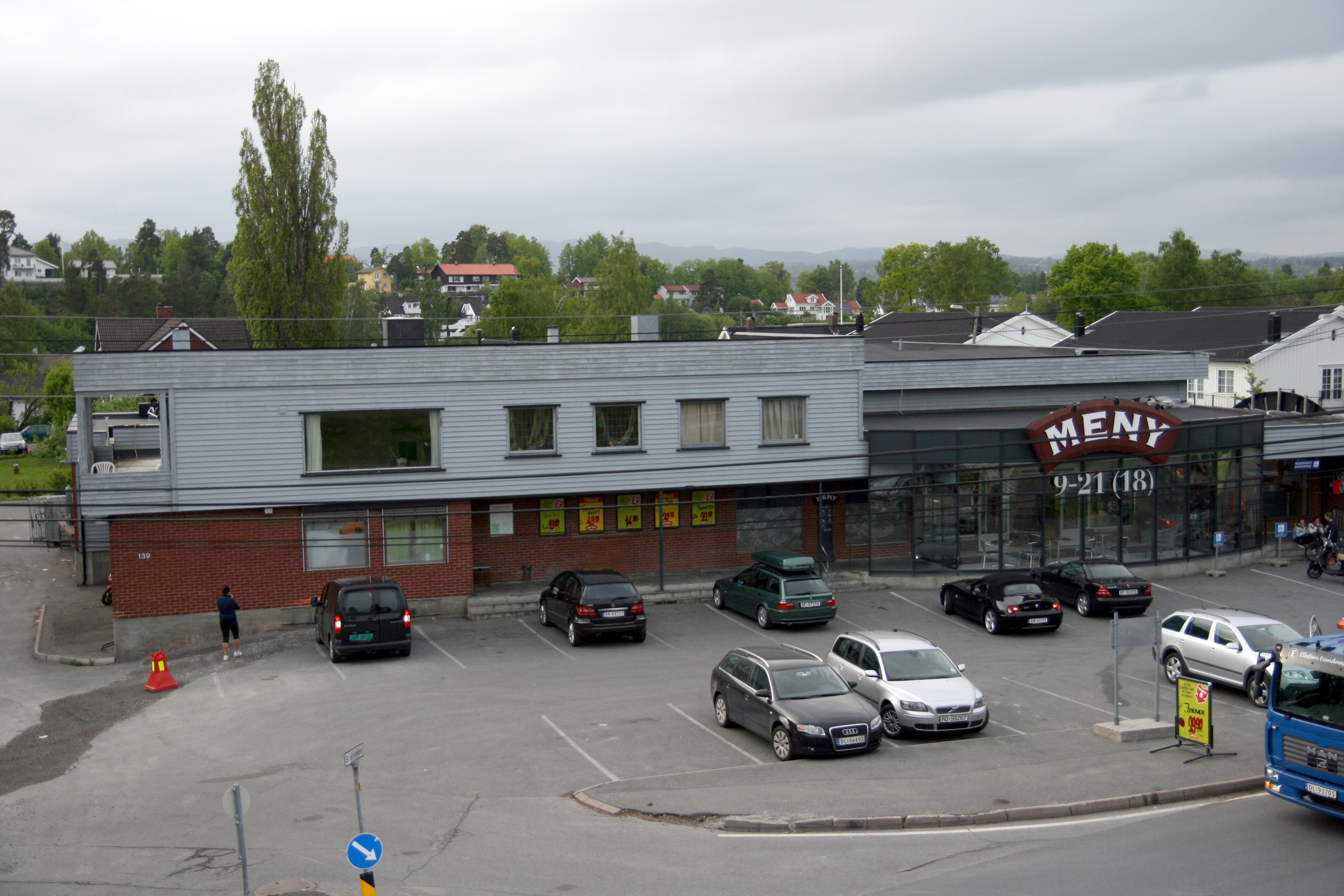
Snarøya's only grocery store

Snarøya is a populated peninsula in the inner Oslofjord in Norway. It belongs to Bærum municipality in Akershus county. It is located south of the districts Lysaker, Lagåsen and Fornebu, and has 2,940 inhabitants.

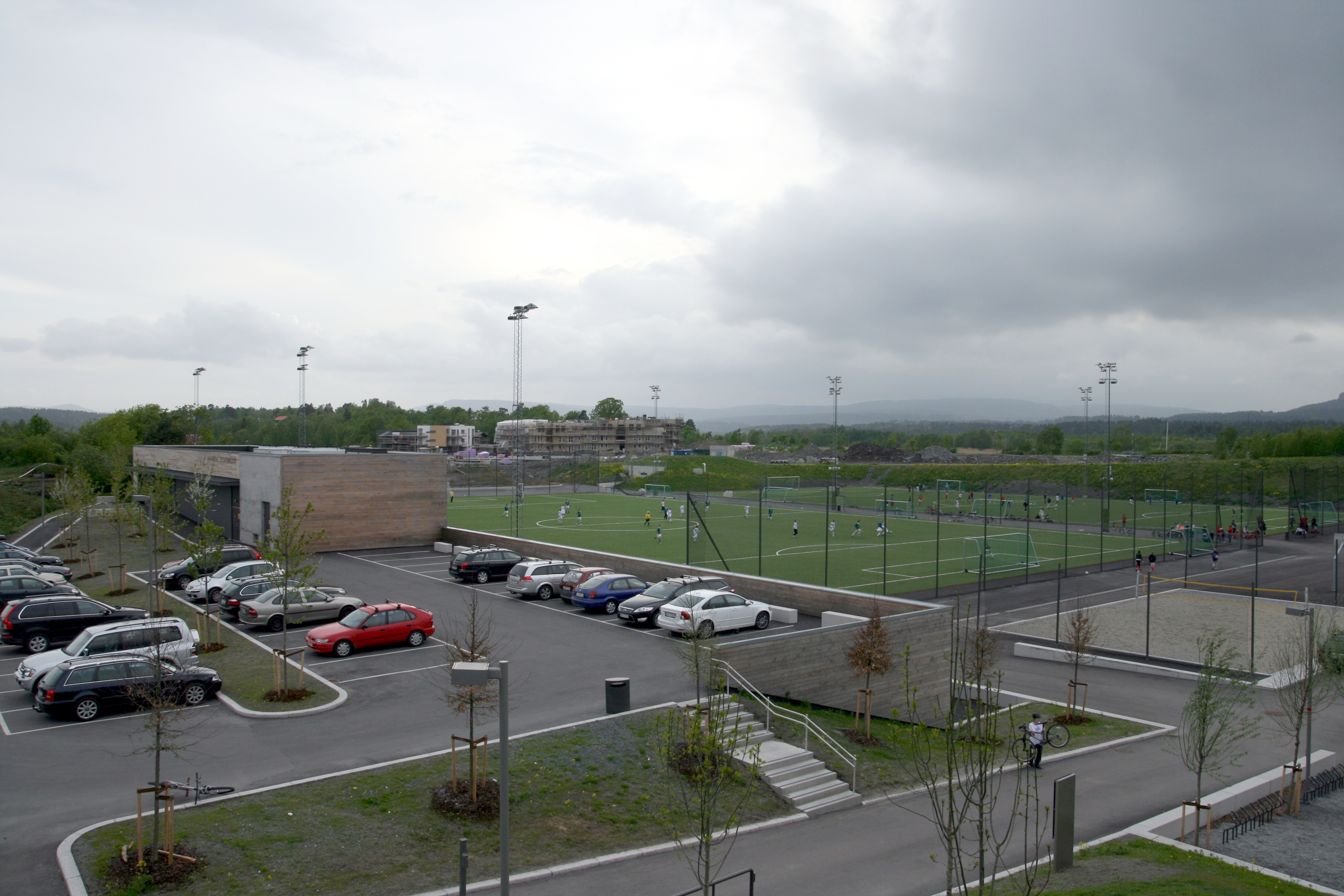
Football fields of Hundsund grendesenter. The closer one is turned into a bandy field in winter.

== History ==
Its name is derived from the word snar, meaning thicket or brushy terrain. The suffix -øya refers to the fact that the peninsula was an island until the nineteenth century.

It is unclear when the island was first settled, but the manor Snarøen is known from historical sources. In 1616 the manor was registered as crown land, but it later became privately owned. It comprised the entire island.

The theologist Christian Kølle, who owned the manor from 1770 and 1803, contributed to history as he published the topographical pamphlet Kort Beskrivelse over Snarøen, en liten Gaard ved Christiania in 1792. His daughter Catharine Hermine Kølle, born at Snarøya, is known as the first female painter in Norway.

In 1867 the manor was bought by a Valentin Fürst, who transformed it into a sawmill. The sawmill was closed in 1907, and at the same time much of the surrounding land was parcelled out into lots for single-owner homes and cottages. In 1923 the manor itself was bought by Mario Caprino, father of the noted film director and writer Ivo Caprino. In 1952 it was rebuilt into a film studio, Caprino Studios.

== Demographics ==
As of 31 December 2007 the district Snarøya had 2,940 inhabitants. This places Snarøya among the lesser-populated districts in Bærum. However, the population is increasing, having been 2,748 in 2001. The age distribution was 28.2% who were 19 years or younger, 8.8% ages 20 to 29, 28.7% ages 30 to 49, 23.3% ages 50 to 66 and 11.0% who were 67 years of age or older.

== Culture ==
Snarøya has a primary school with 326 pupils. The secondary school is located at Hundsund at Fornebu.

Snarøya formerly had its own library as a branch of the municipal public library service. This was discontinued in December 1988.

== Sport ==
The local multi-sports team Snarøya SK was founded on 1 July 1920. It has sections for association football, bandy and team handball. It has two fields with artificial turf, one of which is turned into a bandy field during the winter. The district also has a tennis club, Snarøya TK, which Norway's No. 1 Casper Ruud represents, as well as a curling club, Snarøya CC.

== Politics ==
As a district of Bærum, Snarøya is not self-governed, but elects members to the municipal council. Representatives to the municipal council are elected through a party-list proportional representation system with plural member constituencies. As such, the entire municipality is a single constituency. Snarøya is one of several sub-constituencies within the municipality, meaning that each sub-constituency has its own polling station, for accessibility purposes.

In national elections, the sub-constituency Snarøya contributes towards the total vote in the county, not the municipality. Similarly, the party lists consist of candidates from different parts of the county.

The recent electoral results for Snarøya are as follows:

Party	Result, 2007		Result, 2003	
Party	Snarøya	Bærum	Snarøya	Bærum
Conservative	55.4%	40.4%	59.4%	38.7%
Progress	24.8%	15.3%	22.1%	15.6%
Liberal	6.8%	10.9%	4.0%	5.6%
Labour	6.3%	19.5%	5.7%	16.7%
Christian	3.4%	2.8%	2.5%	3.1%
Socialist Left	2.1%	5.7%	4.8%	14.1%
Folket (local list)	0.4%	0.4%	—	—
Centre	0.3%	1.2%	0.4%	1.4%
Pensioners	0.3%	1.5%	1.0%	2.6%
Red	0.2%	1.3%	0.2%	1.1%
Green	0.1%	0.7%	—	—
Democrats	0.0%	0.2%	0.0%	0.2%

== Transportation ==
Located south of the district Fornebu, Snarøya was served by Oslo Airport, Fornebu from 1939 until the airport was closed in 1998.

Snarøya is not accessible by railway, although a branch line from the Lilleaker Line was proposed in 1919. Instead, it is served by bus, line 31 in the Greater Oslo transportation network. The bus service has been operated since 1921, and was the basis for the first permanent residential areas. Other than that, cars are prevalent, though bicycles are also used. The peninsula is also accessible by boat.
