= Staff (name) =

Staff is both a surname and a nickname. Notable people with the name include:

== Surname ==
- Barbara Staff (1924–2019), American political activist
- David Staff (born 1979), English footballer
- Frank Staff (1918–1971), South African ballet dancer, choreographer, producer and company director
- Hanne Staff (born 1972), Norwegian orienteering athlete
- Jamie Staff (born 1973), English BMX and track racing cyclist and coach
- Kathy Staff (1928–2008), English actress who portrayed Nora Batty in Last of the Summer Wine
- Leopold Staff (1878–1957), Polish poet
- Mark Staff Brandl (born 1955), American-born Swiss artist and art historian
- Ole Johannesen Staff (1789–1861), Norwegian politician
- Ray Staff, mastering engineer for Led Zeppelin, The Rolling Stones, The Clash and Black Sabbath

== Nickname ==
- Staff Barootes (1918–2000), Canadian physician and politician
- Staff Jones (born 1959), Welsh former rugby union player
