= Ole Rasmussen Apeness =

Norwegian district sheriff, soldier and farmer

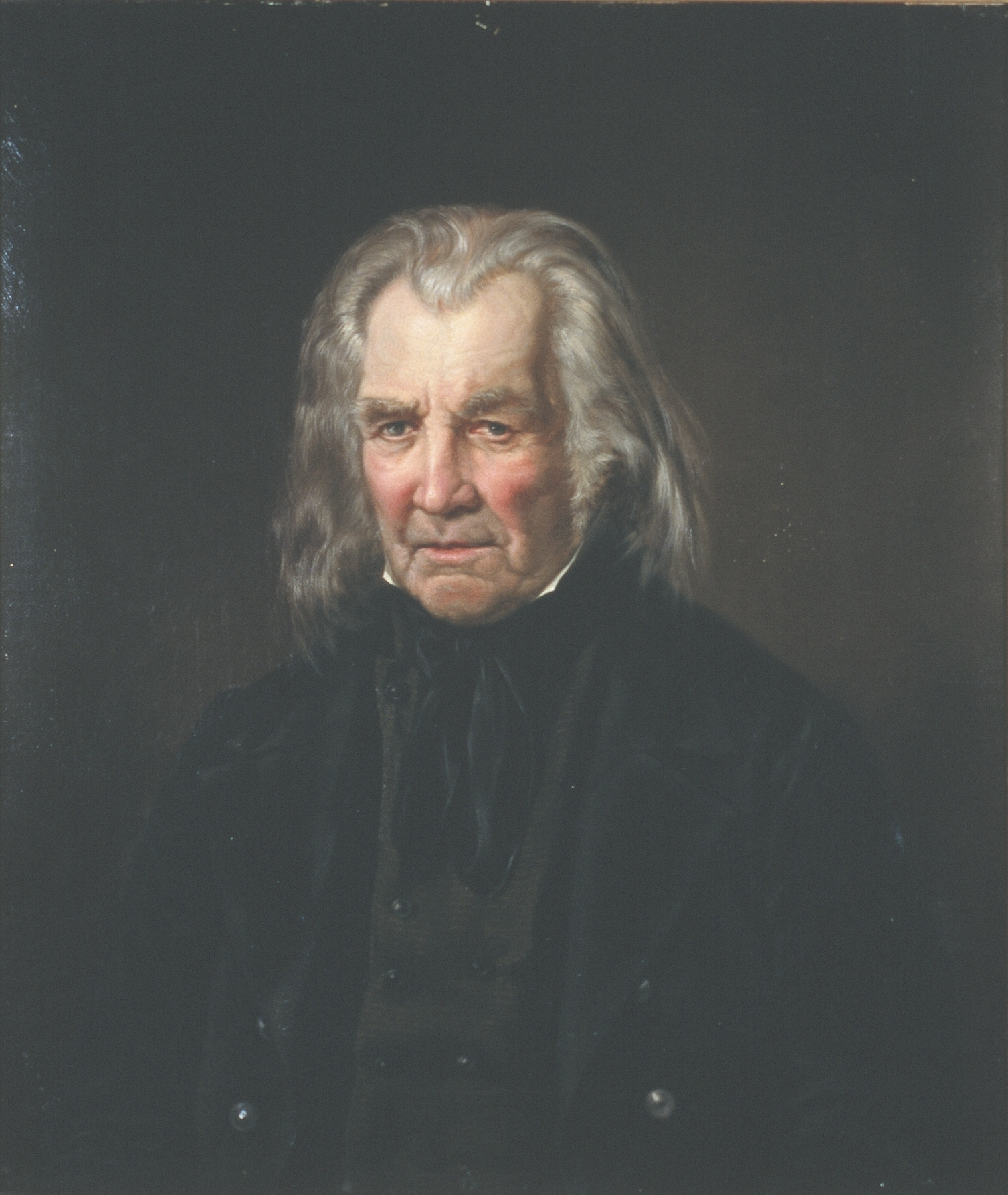
- Ole Rasmussen Apeness by Hedevig Lund (1824–1888). The painting belongs to Eidsvoll 1814. From DigitaltMuseum

Norwegian Constitutional Assembly
- In office 1814–1814

Personal details
- Born: 11 February 1765 Borre, Norway
- Died: 14 February 1859 (aged 94)
- Occupation: District sheriff, soldier, and farmer

Ole Rasmussen Apeness (11 February 1765 – 14 February 1859) was a Norwegian district sheriff, soldier, and farmer. He served as a representative at the Norwegian Constitutional Assembly.

Ole Rasmussen Apeness was born at Borre in Vestfold, Norway. Apeness was associated Haugean pietistic state church reform movement. He became a soldier in 1783 and participated as a non-commissioned officer in the campaign against Sweden in 1788. In 1794 he became sheriff in Borre, a post he held for 30 years. From 1808 to 1845 he was with the Conciliation Commission (Forlikskommisjon). In 1794, he was married to Elen Marie Hansdatter (1775–1818). In 1789, he bought the family farm from his mother where he and his wife raised their seven children. In 1819, his farm, Apenesgården, was purchased for use as Karljohansvern, the main base for the Royal Norwegian Navy in Horten from 1819 to 1963. In 1824 he bought a farm in Sem and stayed there the rest of his life.

He represented Jarlsberg Grevskab (now Vestfold) at the Norwegian Constituent Assembly in 1814. Together with his fellow delegates, Herman Wedel-Jarlsberg and magistrate Gustav Peter Blom, he supported the position of the union party (Unionspartiet).

== Related Reading ==
- Holme Jørn (2014) De kom fra alle kanter - Eidsvollsmennene og deres hus (Oslo: Cappelen Damm) ISBN 978-82-02-44564-5
