= Mikkel Johannesen Borge =

Norwegian politician (1791–1844)

Mikkel Johannesen Borge (28 March 1791 – 30 August 1844) was a Norwegian politician.

He was elected to the Norwegian Parliament in 1836, 1839 and 1842, representing the rural constituency of Søndre Bergenhus Amt (today named Hordaland). He worked as a farmer and bailiff.
