= Sølver Hansen Laane =

Norwegian politician

Sølver Hansen Laane (12 January 1788, Lardal – 12 October 1860) was a Norwegian politician.

He was elected to the Norwegian Parliament in 1842, representing the rural constituency of Jarlsberg og Laurvigs Amt (today named Vestfold). He served only one term.
