= Paul Andreas Kaald =

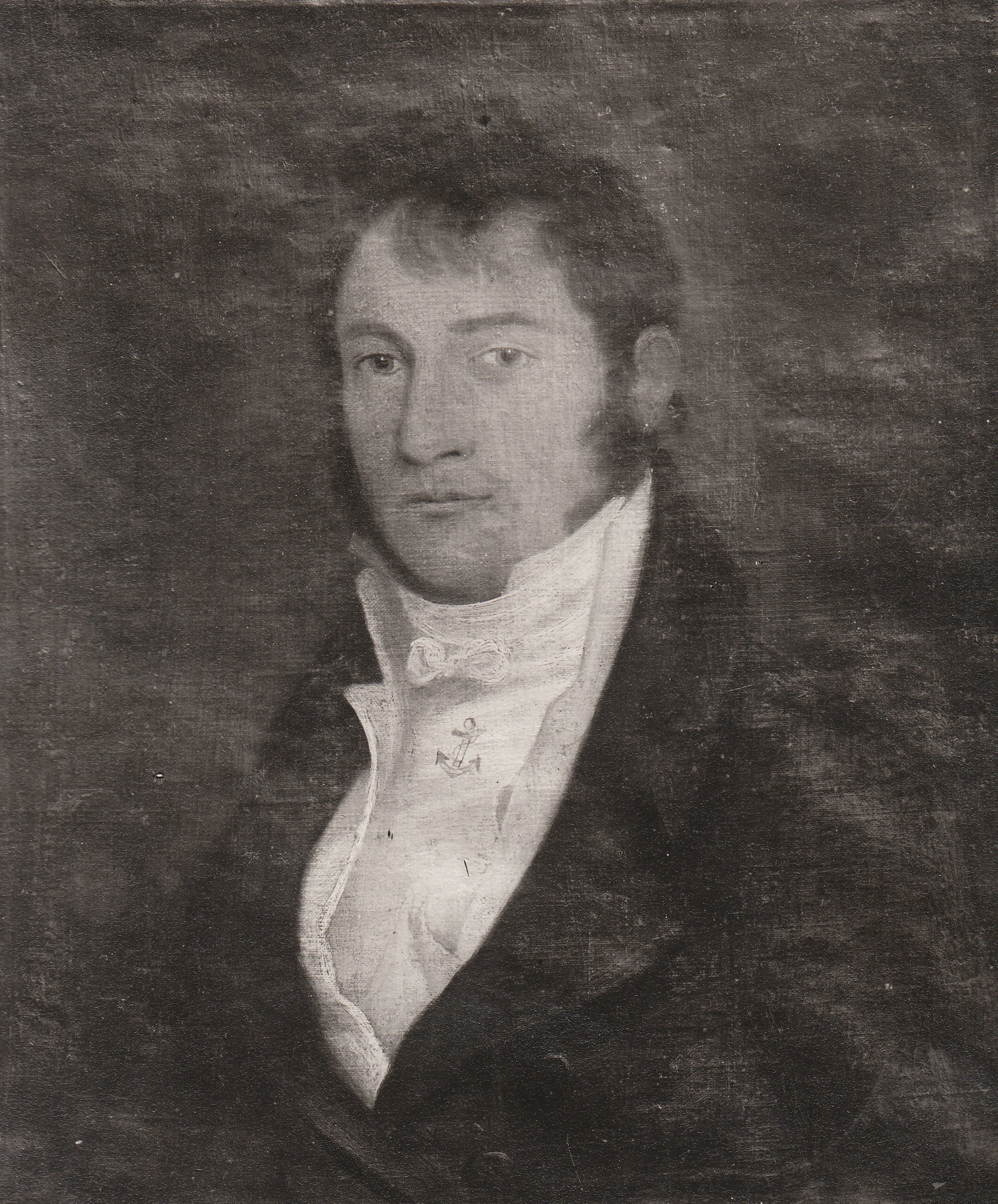
Oil painting of Paul Andreas Kaald

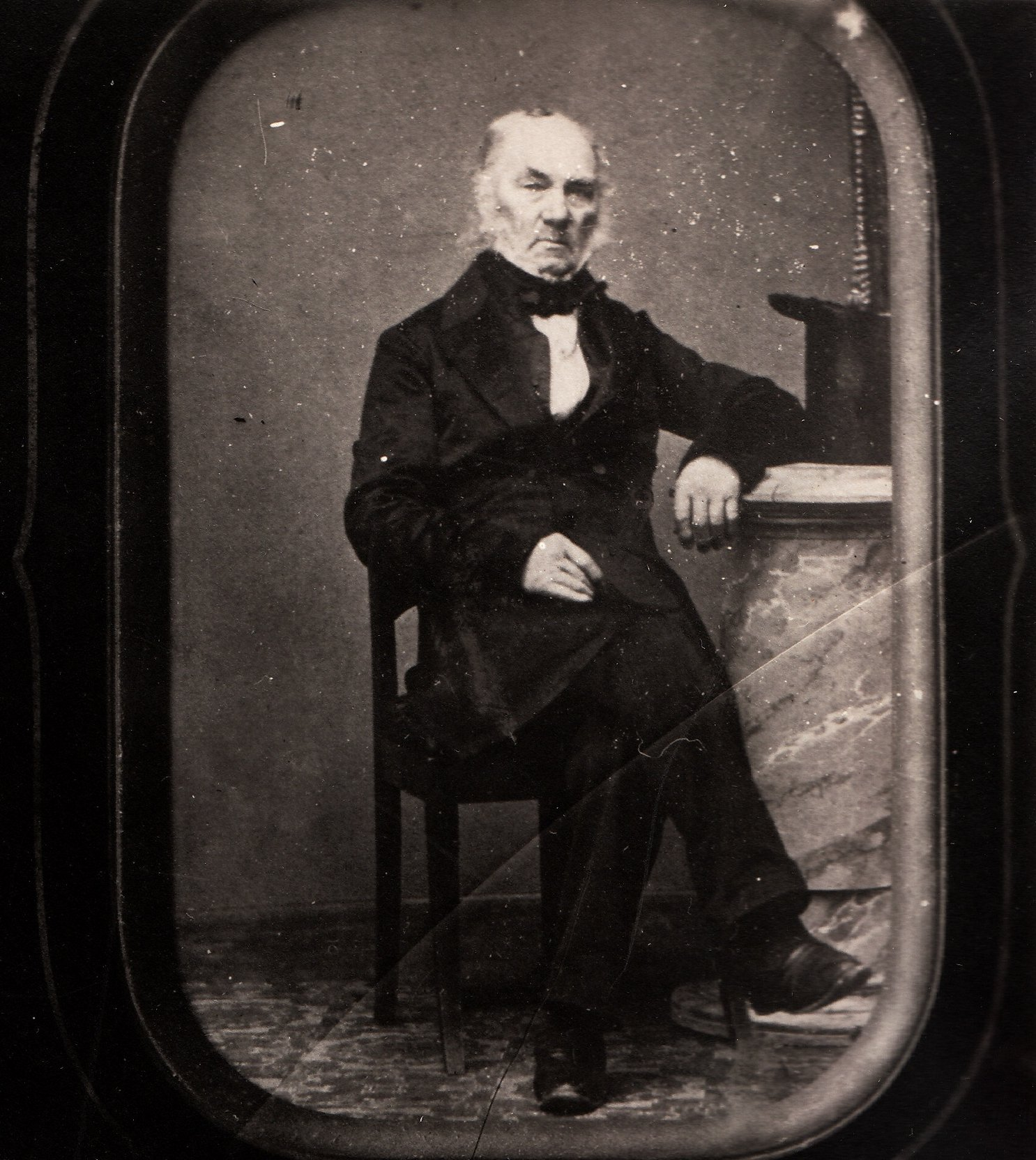
Kaald in old age

Paul Andreas Kaald (12 June 1784 – 24 June 1867) was a Norwegian seafarer. He was chartered as a Norwegian privateer captain from Trondheim during the Gunboat War (1807–1814).

== Biography ==
Kaald went to sea when he was fourteen years old and passed the examination for first mate in 1803. His first journey as a privateer was in 1808; he captained the return of a captured ship to Norway. The captured vessel was refitted and renamed Den Flinke before being sent on a second journey; the voyage was truncated when the ship was retaken by the British. Captain Kaald was imprisoned in Scotland for two years. Kaald was later sent back to Trondheim.

Three years later he ventured forth on his third privateering expedition. His ship Anna Bruun, with a crew of 60 and 14 cannons, was one of the largest privateers based in Norway. This journey made Kaald a rich man. When the war ended, Kaald bought the schooner Isabella. He was the owner of the ship until its disappearance in 1834. He moved to rural Hitra in 1835 and settled on the Grindvik farm where he lived until his death in 1867.

Kaptein Kaalds vei, in the Ladehammeren district of Trondheim, was named in memory of Paul Andreas Kaald.

== Historic background ==
The Gunboat War naval conflict (1807–1814) between Denmark–Norway and the British Navy was conducted during the Napoleonic Wars. After the loss of the Danish fleet to the British in 1807, civilian merchant ships were often engaged by Denmark against British shipping. Private ship owners equipped and manned privateers which could seize enemy merchant ships. Privateers could make fortunes from capturing British ships but fought a vastly superior enemy.

== Sources ==
In 1950, Johan Nicolay Tønnesen (1901–87) edited an extract of the posthumous papers of Captain Paul Andreas Kaald. På kapertokt og i prison, 1808-1810. Av I captein Paul Andreas Kaalds etterlattepapirer (Trondheim: Holboek Erikson & Co. A.s., 1950, 233 p. edited by Johan Nicolay Tønnessen).

== Other sources ==
- Lindeberg, Lars (1974) De så det ske : Englandskrigene 1801-14 (Copenhagen: Lademann) ISBN 87-15-08075-7
- Feldbæk, Ole (2001) Slaget på Reden (Politikens Forlag) ISBN 87-567-4001-8
- Hillingsø, Kjeld (2007) Et trist kapitel - 1807 Landkrigen (Gyldendal) ISBN 978-87-02-06004-1
- Bourgois, Eric Lerdrup; Høffding, Niels (2007) Danmark og Napoleon (Hovedland) ISBN 978-87-7070-061-0
