= Michel Nielsen Grendahl =

Norwegian politician

Michel Nielsen Grendahl (12 March 1775 - 18 January 1849) was a Norwegian farmer, shipbuilder and politician.

Grendahl was born at Rennebu in Søndre Trondhjem, Norway. His parents were Niels Mikkelsen Grindal (1739-1811) and Randi Mikkelsdatter Stavne (1745-1814). He grew up on the family farm (Øvre Grindal i Rennebu) in the parish of Rennebu. He traveled to Bergen where he first became interested in shipping. In 1806, he traveled to Kristiansund where he engaged in shipbuilding. His business did well but he was determined to return to farming. In 1821, he bought Havstein (Havstein Gård på Byåsen), a large farm in Byåsen, just west of the city of Trondheim. Influenced by the reform teachings of Hans Nielsen Hauge, his farm became a spiritual center for the Haugean Movement (haugianere).

Grendahl was elected to the Norwegian Parliament in 1830, 1833, 1836 and 1842, representing the rural constituency of Søndre Trondhjems Amt (today part of Trøndelag county).
