= Ingeborg Belling =

Norwegian actress (1848–1927)

- Born: Ingeborg Regine Belling; 23 December 1848; Bergen, Norway
- Died: 23 April 1927 (aged 78)
- Spouse: Abraham Christian Hjalmar Frithjof Hammer (m. 1872)

Ingeborg Regine Belling (23 December 1848 – 23 April 1927) was a Norwegian actress.

== Personal life ==
Ingeborg Belling was born on 23 December 1848 in Bergen to master carpenter Carl Daniel Belling (1817–1889) and Serine "Siri" Andrine Torkildsdatter (c. 1828–1879). On 12 May 1872, she married actor Abraham Christian Hjalmar Frithjof Hammer in Christiania.

== Career ==
In spring 1870, Belling was a pupil of Danish theatre director Frederik Adolph Cetti in Bergen. Belling participated in several of Cetti's student productions.

From 1870 to 1872, Belling was an actor at Møllergaten's Norwegian Theatre under the direction of Bjørnstjerne Bjørnson. It was here she made her Christiania debut, and acted alongside her future husband. She made her debut in the lead and only role in Johan Ludvig Heiberg's vaudeville monologue Emilies Hjertebanken, which was successfully received. In Dagbladet, it was reported that "the biggest event of the evening, however, was Miss Belling in Emilie's Palpitations, a debutante of the first rank. The way in which she already knows how to fill this demanding little role, the joy, freshness, life that burst out of all the lines, brought the audience into the best mood, and with strong and general shouts of bravado she was evoked. Like all our talented actresses, she is a Bergen woman, and in her our stage has probably found an artist who wants to assert the reputation of her native town".

In autumn 1870, Belling accompanied Bjørnson and his troupe to Trondhjem, where they performed for three months. She then worked at the Christiania Theatre where she, like the other actors from Møllergaten troupe, was re-engaged. She returned to Bergen around 1879, where she was given several roles at the theatre, but her employment there ended in 1881.

== Death ==
Belling died on 23 April 1927, at the age of 78.
