= Lorentz Lange =

Norwegian politician (1783–1860)

Lorentz Lange (23 December 1783 – 8 March 1860) was a Norwegian judge and politician.

He was born in the prestegjeld of Vang in Hedmark county, Norway.

He was appointed by the government as the first Professor of Law at the University of Oslo in 1816, where he served until 1825. From 1825 to 1858 he served as Supreme Court Assessor.

He was elected to the first session of the Parliament of Norway in 1814, representing the constituency Christiansand. He was re-elected in 1815. In 1833 he was re-elected for a third term, representing the constituency of Akershus Amt.
