= Ingvald Anker Andersen =

Norwegian politician (1866–1950)

Ingvald Anker Andersen (2 December 1866 - 19 April 1950) was a Norwegian politician for the Conservative Party.

Born in Trondhjem, he was a member of Trondhjem city council from 1916 to 1919. He served as a deputy representative to the Norwegian Parliament during the term 1922–1924, representing the Market towns of Sør-Trøndelag and Nord-Trøndelag counties.

Outside politics he worked as a saddle maker, inheriting his father's company.
