= Johan Opsahl =

Norwegian politician

Johan Opsahl (12 August 1866 – 18 February 1933) was a Norwegian politician for the Conservative Party.

He was elected to the Parliament of Norway from Øvre Romerike, Akershus amt in 1910, but was not re-elected for a second term. For parts of the term, his seat was filled by Isak Kobro Collett.

Born to farmers in Nes, Akershus, Opsahl took an agrarian education at Aas. He worked with farming, but he also ran a timber merchant business, a sawmill, a mill and a peat dust factory. He was a member of the executive committee of Nes municipal council from 1907 to 1910.
