= August Herman Halvorsen =

Norwegian politician (1866–1929)

August Herman Halvorsen (2 September 1866 - 6 January 1929) was a Norwegian politician for the Labour Democrats.

He served as a deputy representative to the Norwegian Parliament during the term 1919–1921, representing the rural constituency of Vest-Telemarken.

Born in Skien, he grew up in Hollen Municipality and inherited his father's tanning business.

He was a member of the municipal council of Hollen Municipality from 1898 to 1925, serving as mayor from 1916. He also served on a number of public committees, being chairman of the poor's relief agency from 1903 to 1906 and the public trustee's office from 1916 to 1922. For an unknown period he was a member of the county committee of Telemark.
