= Arnt Severin Ulstrup =

Norwegian physician and politician (1862–1922)

Arnt Severin Ulstrup (24 September 1862 – 1922) was a Norwegian physician and politician for the Conservative Party.

He was elected to the Norwegian Parliament in 1910 from the constituency Østerrisør, and was re-elected in 1913.

Born in Brekkestø, he enrolled as a student in 1883 and graduated as cand.med. in 1890. He first opened his own physician's office in Lillesand, in 1890, but moved to Risør in 1891 and became town physician there in 1910. He was a member of the municipal council for Risør Municipality, and was also director of the local savings bank for some time.
