= Karl Anton Sanderød =

Norwegian politician

Karl Anton Sanderød (21 March 1855 – 1924) was a Norwegian politician.

== Personal life ==
He was born at Røsland as the son of Ole Knutsen Sanderød (1828–1907) and Anne Helene Abrahamsdatter (1830–1908).

In 1879 he married Marie Ringdal (1850–1923) from Drammen. They had one son, born in 1881.

== Career ==
He worked in the police sergeant's office in Vaale Municipality from 1869 to 1879. From 1876 to 1879 he was also municipal treasurer. He then moved to Ramnes to become a police sergeant. Here, he was a member of the municipal council of Ramnes Municipality from 1888 to 1900. He was elected to the Norwegian Parliament in 1900, representing the constituency of Jarlsberg og Larviks Amt. He had previously been a deputy representative from 1898 to 1900. One of his primary concerns was the establishment of the Tønsberg–Eidsfoss Line, which was opened in 1901.

In 1903 he moved from Ramnes to Barkåker in Sem Municipality to work as a police sergeant there. He was a member of the municipal council in Sem Municipality from 1908 to 1910. He retired in 1920, and died in 1924.
