= Simon Christian Hammer =

Norwegian writer and journalist

Simon Christian Hammer (19 December 1866 – 18 March 1932) was a Norwegian writer and journalist.

== Life ==
He was born in Arendal in the county of Aust-Agder, Norway. He became editor-in-chief of Stavangeren in 1893, and later worked at Farmand, Verdens Gang and Tidens Tegn. He was also the Norwegian correspondent for The Times from 1917 to 1932. He published several history books.

== Selected works ==
- Ludvig Holberg, the Founder of Norwegian Literature and an Oxford Student
- Kristianias historie (1923)
- Nicolai Andreas Grevstad (Norsk biografisk leksikon. Oslo, Norway: 1929)
- Things seen in Norway (1934)
