= Andreas Samuelsen Vibstad =

Norwegian politician

Andreas Samuelsen Vibstad (6 October 1783 – 27 January 1854) was a Norwegian politician.

He was elected to the first session of the Norwegian Parliament in 1827, representing the constituency of Nordre Throndhjems Amt. He worked as a farmer there. He only served one term.
