= Jens Essendrop =

Norwegian clergyman and topographical writer (1723–1801)

- Born: 24 November 1723; Christiania, Norway
- Died: 12 December 1801 (aged 78)
- Education: Theology
- Alma mater: University of Copenhagen
- Occupations: Clergyman, mining official and topographical writer

Jens Essendrop (24 November 1723 – 12 December 1801) was a Norwegian clergyman, mining official and topographical writer. He was born in Christiania, a son of priest Søren Essendrop and Pauline Holst. He served as mining officer (Norwegian: overbergamtsforvalter) in Kongsberg from 1771. His work Physisk Oeconomisk Beskrivelse over Lier Præstegield introduced the topographical descriptions of parishes as a literary genre in Norway, and became a model for succeeding writers.
