= Asle Kristensen Hoffart =

Norwegian politician

Asle Kristensen Hoffart (November 14, 1788 – November 29, 1851) was a Norwegian politician.

He was elected to the Norwegian Parliament in 1842, representing the rural constituency of Buskeruds Amt (today named Buskerud). He worked as a farmer. He served only one term.
