= Jan Verner Tranefelt =

Swedish military personnel (1730–1806)

- Born: 1730
- Died: 1806 (aged 75–76)
- Allegiance: Sweden
- Conflicts: Russo-Swedish War (1788–1790); Battle of Kvistrum

Jan Verner Tranefelt (1730–1806) was a Swedish military officer who served under Gustav III of Sweden.

== Career ==
- 1773: överstelöjtnant (lieutenant colonel)
- 1780: överste (colonel)

== Bibliography ==
- Berglund Carl-Axel, ed. (1961), Kungl. Bohusläns regemente och dess hembygd: inför ett trehundraårsminne. D. 3 (in Swedish), Uddevalla: Kungl. Bohusläns regementes historiekomm., LIBRIS 1245672
- Generalmönsterrulla för Bohus Lähns Lätta Dragonregemente 1783
