= Sjur Hansen Halkjeldsvik =

Norwegian politician

Sjur Hansen Halkjeldsvik (26 August 1787 – 6 September 1868) was a Norwegian politician.

He was elected to the Norwegian Parliament in 1830, representing the constituency of Romsdals Amt. He was re-elected in 1848, having been a deputy representative in 1845. He worked as a farmer.
