= Ove Christian Charlot Klykken =

Norwegian politician

Ove Christian Charlot Beck Klykken (8 October 1862 – 2 October 1929) was a Norwegian politician for the Conservative Party.

Born in Skogn Municipality, he married Sofie Bull from Nordkapp Municipality and settled in Lebesby Municipality, working as a merchant.

He was elected to the Norwegian Parliament for the term 1900–1903, representing the rural constituency Finmarkens Amt. He only sat through one term.
