= Johan Frederik Knudzen Nødbæk =

Norwegian politician

Johan Frederik Knudzen Nødbæk (25 August 1787, Holme – 26 February 1871, Holme) was a Norwegian politician.

He was elected to the Norwegian Parliament in 1842 and 1845, representing the rural constituency of Lister og Mandals Amt (today part of Agder county). He worked as a farmer.
