= Wilhelmine Gulowsen =

Norwegian writer (1848–1899)

- Born: Wilhelmine Mentzine Sissener; 21 May 1848; Kongsvinger, Hedmark, Norway
- Died: 26 May 1899 (aged 51)
- Spouse: Anders Gulowsen (m. 1866)
- Relatives: Valborg Seeberg (sister)
- Writing career
- Pen name: Waldemar Steen; Annar Mentz

Wilhelmine Mentzine Gulowsen (21 May 1848 – 26 May 1899) was a Norwegian author, poet, editor and translator.

== Early life ==
Wilhelmine Mentzine Sissener was born on 21 May 1848 in Kongsvinger to Captain Johan Peter Brandt Sissener and his first wife Oline Riiser. She was the sister of author Valborg Seeberg. On 2 December 1866, she married Anders Gulowsen.

== Career ==
Gulowsen's first independent publication was the poetry collection Strengeleg, published under the pseudonym Waldemar Steen and consists of a number of love poems written from a traditionally male perspective, in which she celebrates female beauty.

In 1882, she published Mindeblade over fru Johanne Reimers, a book about actress Johanne Regine Reimers. That same year, Gulowsen became the editor of the culture-oriented weekly magazine Figaro, which she led from 1882 to 1883. She was also a cultural writer for several of the daily newspapers at the time.

Gulowsen embarked on several trips throughout Europe, which was reflected in her next releases. In 1884, she published Lidt om Recensionerne og Theatrene i Stockholm under the pseudonym Annar Mentz and in 1885 she released Alene med mange – reisebreve fra Frankrig, Italien og Schweitz, af den der har gjort turen.

== Later life and death ==
Gulowsen died on 26 May 1899, at the age of 51.
