= Maria Nubsen =

Norwegian midwife

- Born: Maria Christensdatter Hansen c.1780
- Died: 1852 (aged 71–72); Christiania, Norway
- Education: Fødselsstiftelsen, Copenhagen
- Occupation: midwife
- Years active: 1801–1850

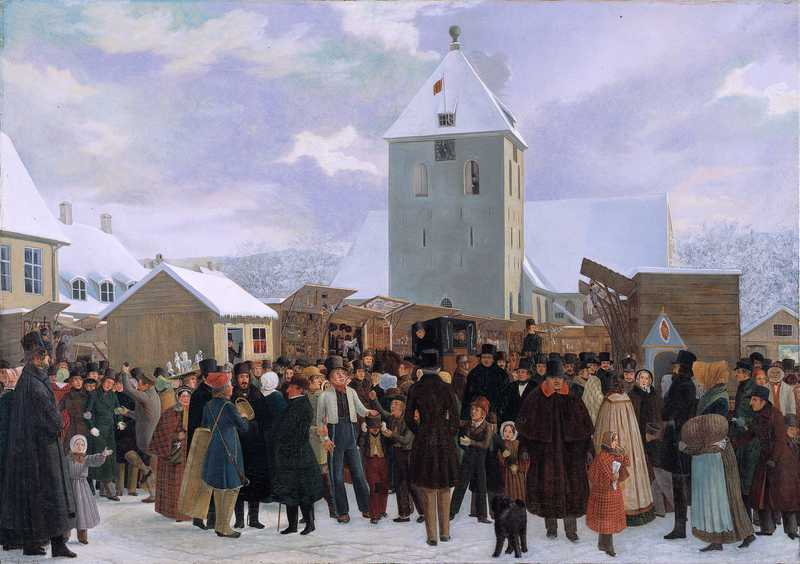
Painting (1843) of a scene from the Stortorvet marketplace by Ludvig Wilhelm Theodor Bratz. Among the portrayed persons are madame Nubsen, Henrik Wergeland, Johan Fjeldsted Dahl and Erik Røring Møinichen

Maria Nubsen (c,1780–1852) was a Norwegian midwife. She served as midwife in Christiania for nearly fifty years.

She was a daughter of Christen Hansen, and married Lars Nubsen in 1801. After receiving education at Fødselsstiftelsen in Copenhagen, she was approved midwife in 1799. She was assigned as midwife in Christiania from 1801, and practiced until about 1850, including an assignment for the maternity institution Fødselsstiftelsen in Christiania from 1818 to 1831, the foundation's first midwife.
