= Battle of Kvistrum =

Battle of the Theatre War

- Part of the Theatre War
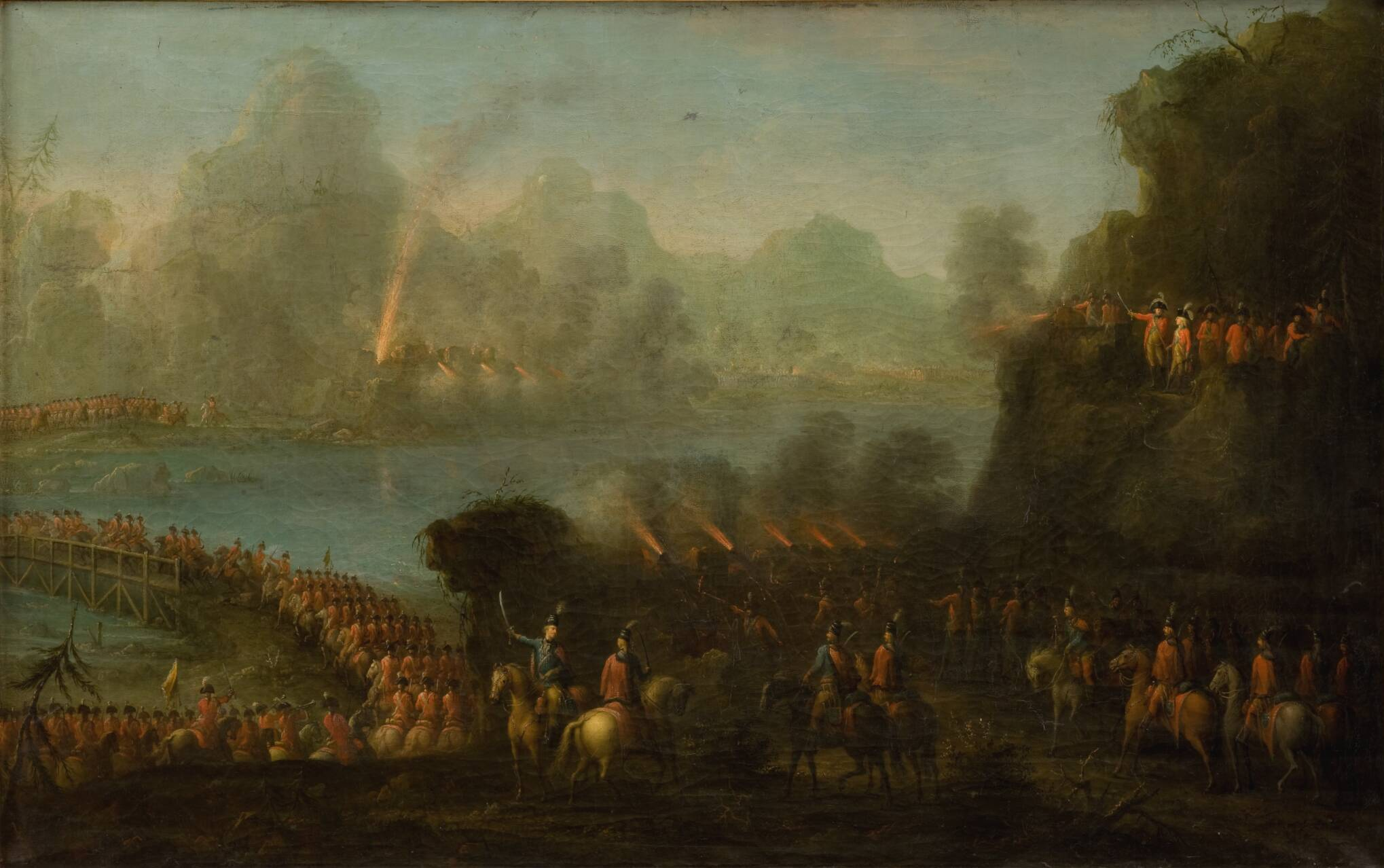
- The affair at Quistrumbro; Anthon Christoffer Rüde, 1790
Date	September 29, 1788
Location	Kviström, Sweden 58°27′37″N 11°41′25″E
Result	Dano-Norwegian victory

Belligerents
Denmark–Norway	Sweden

Commanders and leaders
Johann Friedrich von und zu Mansbach	Jan Verner Tranefelt (POW)

Strength
7,500–8,000 men	850 men

Casualties and losses
5 killed 16 wounded	5 killed 845 captured

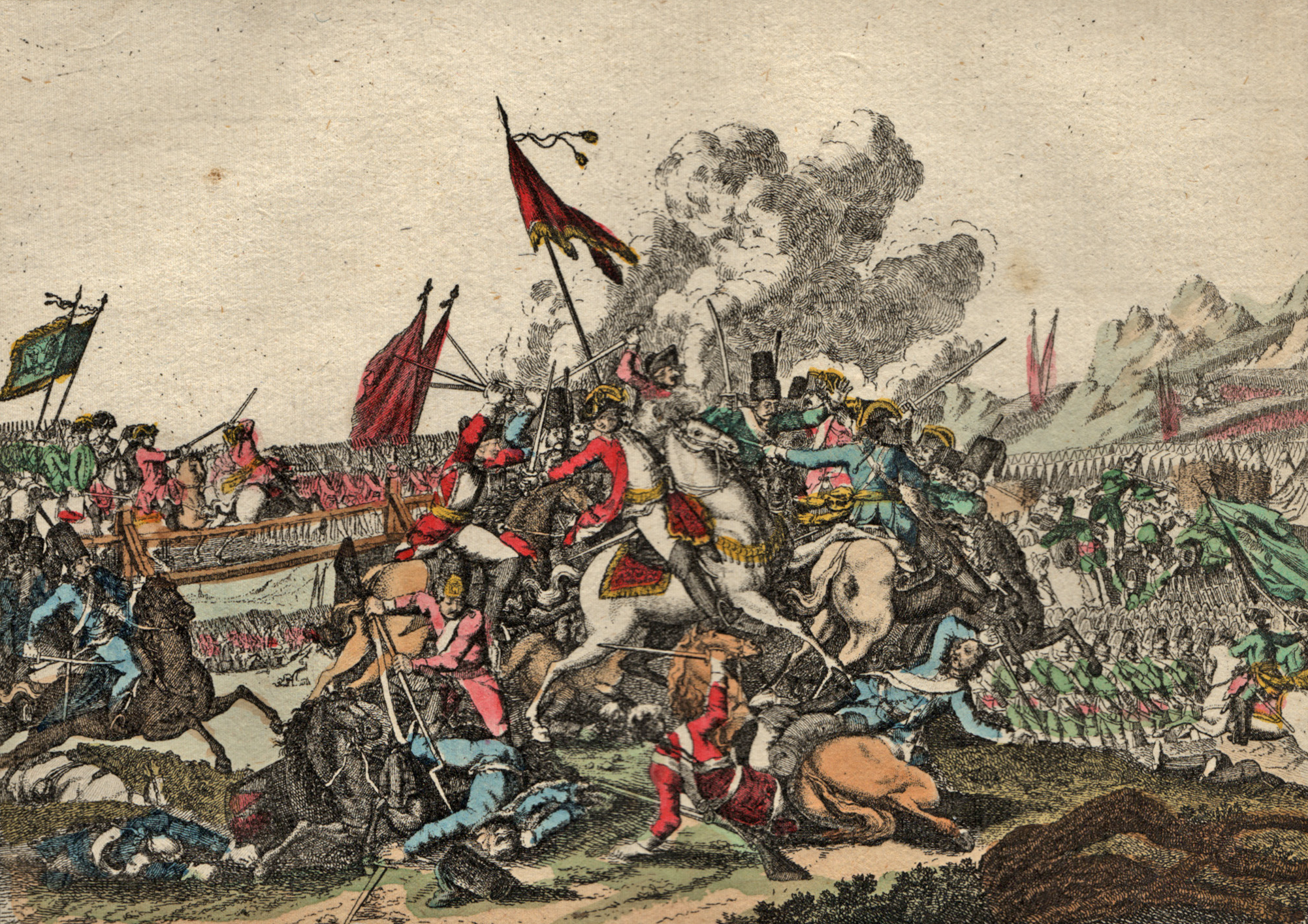
Battle of Kvistrum, as depicted in Nordischer Kriegsschauplaz

The Battle of Kvistrum (also known as the Battle of Kvistrum Bridge) was fought on 29 September 1788 during the Theatre War, a phase of the Russo-Swedish War of 1788–1790, between Sweden and the Denmark–Norway. The Swedes lost the battle and had five killed and the rest captured with 60 wounded, the Danes and Norwegians had suffered 5 killed and 16 wounded.
