= Gjert Holsen =

Norwegian politician

Gjert Martinus Markvardson Holsen (1855 – 1921) was a Norwegian politician for the Conservative Party.

He was born in Holsen. He served as a representative to the Norwegian Parliament from 1889 to 1897 and 1903 to 1912. During this time he served as President of the Lagting from 1905–1906.

He was a member of the municipal council for Førde Municipality from 1887 to 1910. Outside politics he was a farmer.
