= Martin Halvorsen Vee =

Norwegian politician

Martin Halvorsen Vee or perhaps Matias Halvorsen Ve (1 March 1791 – 22 October 1864) was a Norwegian politician.

He was elected to the Norwegian Parliament in 1845, representing the constituency of Jarlsberg og Laurviks Amt. He worked as a farmer there. He served only one term.
