= Arnt Arntsen Wang =

Norwegian politician

Arnt Arntsen Wang (1791 – 14 November 1845) was a Norwegian politician.

Wang was elected to the Norwegian Parliament in 1839, representing the constituency of Nordre Throndhjems Amt. He worked as a farmer there. He served only one term.
