= Mads Lauritz Madsen =

Norwegian politician

Mads Lauritz Madsen (1782–1840) was a Norwegian politician.

He was elected to the first session of the Norwegian Parliament in 1827, representing the constituency of Drammen. He worked as a merchant in that city. He only served one term.
