= Ludvig Larsen Kragtorp =

Norwegian physician and politician

Ludvig Larsen Kragtorp (14 November 1862 – 25 November 1928) was a Norwegian physician and politician for the Liberal Party.

He was elected to the Norwegian Parliament in 1907 from the constituency Eidsberg, and was re-elected in 1910 and 1913.

Born in Rødenes, he enrolled as a student in 1884 and graduated as Candidate of Medicine in 1892. He first opened his own physician's office in Høland in 1893, but then worked as municipal physician in Spydeberg from 1893 to 1912. He was the mayor of Spydeberg from 1904 to 1907, having been a member of the municipal council. He also chaired the school board from 1899 to 1903.

== Electoral history ==
=== 1906 Norwegian parliamentary election ===
Candidate	Party	First round		Second round	
Candidate	Party	Votes	%	Votes	%
Ludvig Larsen Kragtorp	Venstre	1,027	46.75	1,390	85.38
Grundt, J. A.	Coalition Party (Høyre)	510	23.21	158	9.71
Hjelmark, A.	Coalition Party (Venstre)	330	15.02	23	1.41
Revhaug, A. .	Labour Party	158	7.19	2	0.12
Trømborg, H . T.	Coalition Party (Venstre)	90	4.10	52	3.19
Wergeland, S. L	Coalition Party (Høyre)	82	3.73	3	0.18
Total		2,197	100.00	1,628	100.00
Valid votes		2,197	99.86	1,628	99.33
Invalid/blank votes		3	0.14	11	0.67
Total votes		2,200	100.00	1,639	100.00
Registered voters/turnout		4,108	53.55	4,118	39.80
Source: Statistics Norway
