= Peder Nielsen Hemb =

Norwegian politician

Peder Nielsen Hemb (23 February 1782, Lardal – 1 September 1850, Lardal) was a Norwegian politician.

He was elected to the Norwegian Parliament in 1836, 1842 and 1845, representing the rural constituency of Jarlsberg og Laurvigs Amt (today named Vestfold). He worked as a farmer.
