= Jonas Anton Hielm =

Norwegian lawyer and politician (1782–1848)

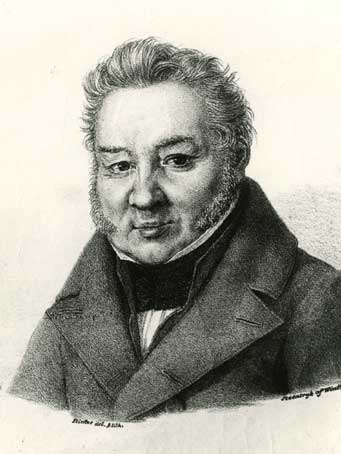
Jonas Anton Hielm

Jonas Anton Hielm (30 December 1782 – 30 March 1848) was a Norwegian lawyer and Member of Parliament .

Jonas Anton Hielm was born in Kristiansand in Vest-Agder, Norway. He was the son of regiment quartermaster and garrison auditor, Børge Hielm (died 1810). He was a law student at the University of Copenhagen from 1797 to 1800. He passed his Candidate of Law (cand.jur.) examination in 1802.

He became a barrister in Copenhagen until 1814. During 1815–1816, he was a senior lecturer at the University of Oslo. From 1815 to 1821, he served as state auditor. In 1822, he was suspended from office based upon libel charges involving Christian Magnus Falsen, Attorney General of the Norway. By a decision of the Supreme Court of Norway in 1825, Hielm was sentenced to pay a fine and the suspension as barrister was adjourned.

Subsequently, he was a representative to the Norwegian Storting from Smaalenenes amt (now Østfold) during session in 1830, 1833, 1836 and 1842. In Parliament, he was an advocate of Norwegian equality within the Union between Sweden and Norway including the right of Norwegian merchant ships to fly the Norwegian flag rather than that of the union.
