= Ole Johannesen Staff =

Norwegian politician

Ole Johannesen Staff (1799–1861) was a Norwegian politician.

He was elected to the Norwegian Parliament in 1836, 1839 and 1842, representing the rural constituency of Christians Amt (today part of Innlandet). He worked as a farmer.
