= Thomas Vigner Christiansen Haaland =

Norwegian politician

Thomas Vigner Christiansen Haaland (29 August 1859 - 15 July 1913) was a Norwegian politician.

Born in Torvestad Municipality, he worked as a banker and ship-owner for the most of his career.

He was a member of the municipal council of Haugesund Municipality, serving as mayor in 1900, 1902, 1903 and 1910. He served as a deputy representative to the Norwegian Parliament during the term 1904–1906, representing the Moderate Liberal Party, and in 1907–1909 for the Coalition Party.
