= Thomas Wegner Larsen Haaland =

Norwegian politician

Thomas Wegner Larsen Haaland (25 June 1862 – 12 July 1935) was a Norwegian politician for the Liberal Party.

Born in Torvestad Municipality, he worked as a banker and farmer for the most of his career. He was a mayor of Torvestad Municipality from 1907. He was elected to the Norwegian Parliament in 1913, representing the constituency of Karmsund. He served only one term.
