= Michael Sevald Aamodt =

Norwegian politician

Michael Sevald Præstrup Aamodt (1784–1859) was a Norwegian politician.

He was elected to the Norwegian Parliament in 1824, representing the rural constituency of Lister og Mandals Amt. He sat through only one term.

Hailing from Øye in Kvinesdal, he worked as a goldsmith and vaccinator. He died in 1859.

== See also ==
- Politics of Norway
