= Theatre War =

1788–1789 war between Denmark-Norway and Sweden

- Part of the Russo-Swedish War of 1788–1790
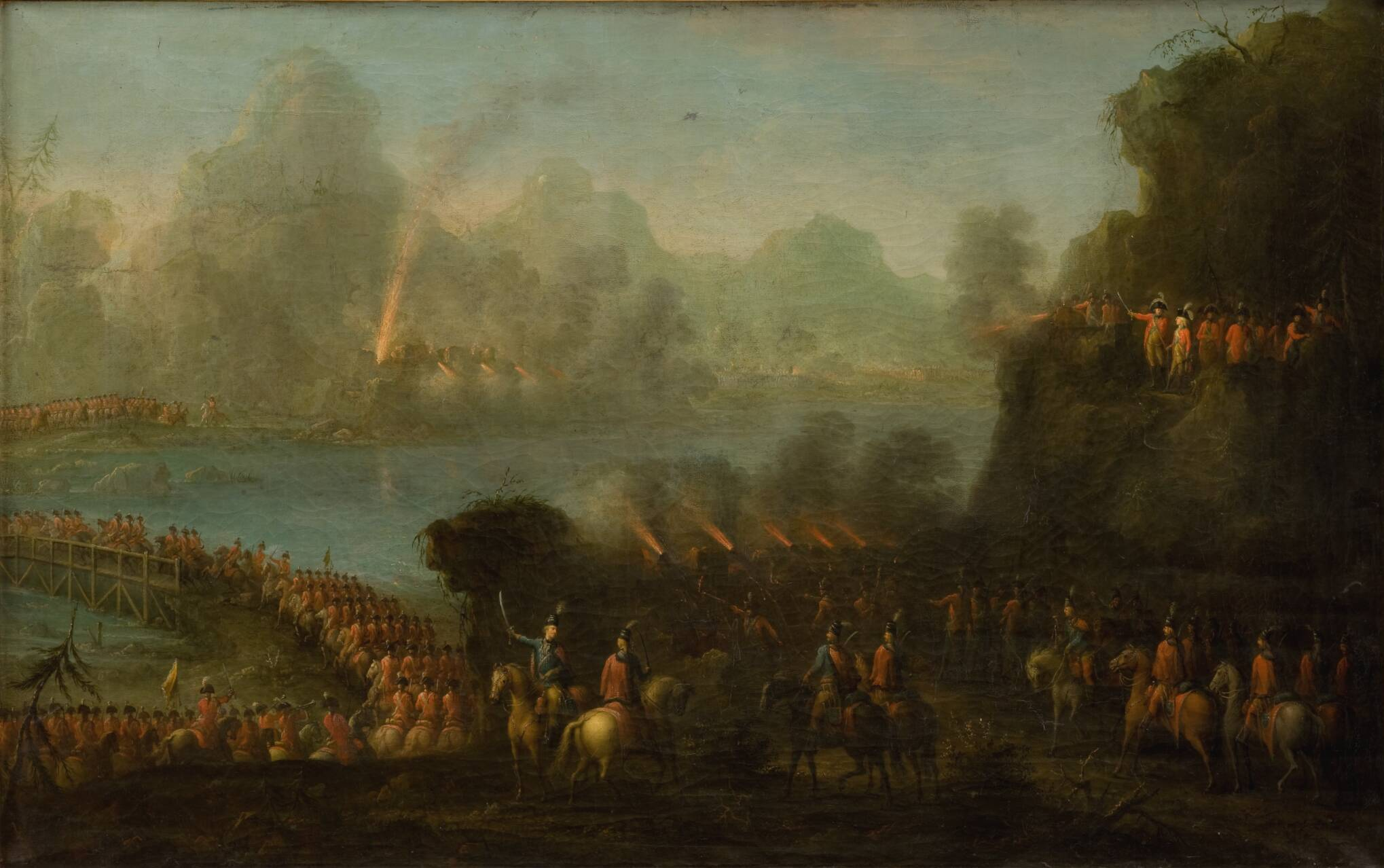
- The affair at Quistrumbro; Anthon Christoffer Rüde, 1790
Date	24 September 1788 – 9 July 1789
Location	Scandinavian Peninsula
Result	See § Conclusion and aftermath
Territorial changes	Status quo ante bellum

Belligerents
Denmark–Norway	Sweden

Commanders and leaders
(Denmark–Norway) Christian VII (Denmark–Norway) Charles of Hesse (Denmark–Norway) Johann Friedrich	Gustav III; Rudolf du Rietz; Jan Verner Tranefelt

Strength
8,000–10,000 men	10,000 men

Casualties and losses
1,500–3,000 dead (Note: Only 6 people died in direct combat, most casualties are from hunger, disease, poor sanitary conditions, and continual rainfall.): 6 killed in combat	Unknown, at least 5 dead (Note: 60 wounded, and 845 captured.)

The Theatre War (Swedish: Teaterkriget), Cowberry War, Cranberry War or Lingonberry War (Norwegian: Tyttebærkrigen, Danish: Tyttebærkrigen), was a brief war between Denmark–Norway and Sweden, starting on 24 September 1788, formally lasting until 9 July 1789. Although the decision to launch the attack was taken in Denmark, the majority of the attacking soldiers were Norwegians from the Norwegian army.

The attack was directed towards the region known as Bohuslän in Sweden, and was supposed to act as a diversion to relieve Russia, which was an ally of Denmark–Norway, and had recently been attacked by Sweden (Gustav III's Russian War). This forced Denmark–Norway to honour their alliance between the two states that had been signed in 1773.

== Background ==
When Gustav III of Sweden, on his own initiative and unconstitutionally, attacked Russia in 1788 and thereby started the Russo-Swedish War of 1788–90, Denmark-Norway found itself in an awkward position. In the 1773 Treaty of Tsarskoye Selo, Denmark–Norway had committed itself to assist with 12,000 men, six ships of the line, and three frigates in the case Russia were to be attacked. Soon after the Swedish attack, the Russians demanded that Denmark–Norway keep its promise, and Denmark–Norway was thus forced to join the war. When Gustav III received news of this, he exclaimed, "I am saved!"

Considering that the attack on Russia was Gustav's own initiative, that many Swedish officers and the king's opponents were strongly against the war (see Anjala conspiracy), and that the war was not being fought very successfully, this exclamation might seem strange. However, Gustav III, the astute politician, saw this as a golden opportunity to turn the Swedish opinion in his favour. He left the battlefront in Finland and proceeded to Stockholm and then Dalarna, where he managed to incite several free corps to participate in the defense against the Danes and Norwegians. Despite strong popular support, Sweden had only 10,000 men who had to be divided between Skåne, Jämtland, and Bohuslän.

== Danish-Norwegian attack ==
The first Danish-Norwegian force of about 8,000-10,000 men under the command of Prince Charles of Hesse attacked Bohuslän from Norway on 24 September and advanced quickly toward Vänersborg, meeting feeble Swedish resistance. Colonel Johan Werner Tranefelt ensconced himself in Kvistrum north of Uddevalla with his 700 men but was defeated on 29 September by a much larger Danish–Norwegian force led by Major General Johann Friedrich von und zu Mansbach. In a week, the Danish–Norwegians took Uddevalla, Vänersborg, and Åmål, and on 6 October, they stopped at Gothenburg, demanding its surrender. Out of 10,000 soldiers, the Norwegians lost only 8 in the aforementioned confrontations.

=== Defense of Gothenburg ===
By this time, Gustav III himself had arrived in Gothenburg and took resolute action; he dismissed the passive Lieutenant General, Anders Rudolf du Rietz, and replaced him with Johan Sparre af Söfdeborg. The defenses of Gothenburg were quickly strengthened. In addition, the British ambassador to Copenhagen, Sir Hugh Elliot, arrived in Gothenburg and brokered a short armistice with the Dano-Norwegian commander on 9 October. Delaying and stalling tactics prolonged the armistice in stages until May 1789.

== Conclusion and aftermath ==
Faced with the armistice, threats of a joint attack on Holstein from both Great Britain and Prussia, and an ever more strongly defended Gothenburg, the Danish–Norwegian troops marched off on 12 November 1788 toward Norway, and Gustav III could use this as an excuse to call it a victory. This was convenient for Sweden since the fighting on the Finnish front was still very much in progress.

The success could have turned into a debâcle when it was revealed that Lieutenant Benzelstjärna, with the king's approval, had planned to burn the seven Russian ships in the Copenhagen harbour. Through the revelation, the plans were never carried out.

The attacking Danish-Norwegian force only lost six men through acts of war. The almost frivolous Swedish and Norwegian names for the conflict do not reflect the real suffering caused by it: the Danish–Norwegian army lost 1,500-3,000 men to hunger, disease, poor sanitary conditions, and exposure to continual autumn rainfall. On 12 November, the Norwegian division retreated to Norway.

On 9 July 1789, before the threat of a combined might of Britain and Prussia, Denmark–Norway agreed to cease active engagement in the conflict. A statement of neutrality was issued by Denmark-Norway, not a formal peace treaty.

Some modern historians such as Ulf Sundberg and Dick Harrison, see this as a Swedish victory, with Sundberg stating that "considering that Denmark was forced out of the war, one can, with some hesitance, categorize the outcome as a Swedish victory." Yet other historians see the war as inconclusive, with historian and co-writer of Tyttebærkrigen: det norske felttog i Sverige 1788, Tore Dyrhaug, stating that "... neither the battle nor the war led to anything."

=== Reception in Denmark–Norway ===
Despite the outcome, the Crown Prince Frederick of Denmark utilized the Battle of Kvistrum Bridge to portray Denmark–Norway as the victor. Additionally, Privy Councillor of Denmark, Andreas Peter Bernstorff, had managed to preserve the Dano-Russian Alliance with as few resources as possible. As such, despite the massive casualties, the war was still seen as a Danish victory in Denmark. The Danish journalist, Karin Kryger, describes the Danish reaction as follows:

The Danish interpretation was that Denmark had won, and that the Crown Prince, by his resolute action, had kicked Sweden into its place and secured peace. This mild overinterpretation of the event came into full play when the Crown Prince returned home on 7 December 1788 and was received by an enthusiastic capital.

— Karin Kryger

Subsequently, when Frederick and Charles of Hesse-Kassel returned to Christiania (present-day Oslo), the newspaper Norske Intelligenz-Seddeler wrote that at "the honourable affair at Kvistrum," only one officer and five soldiers had fallen, furthermore stating that the enemy had been routed. Meanwhile, Frederick and Charles were received with cheers, parties, and pompous speeches from the inhabitants of Christiania, and, according to the Norske Intelligenz-Seddeler, the whole city was illuminated when the two rode across the city. According to a later historian, Ernst Sars, they were received as they were "an Alexander." Parties continued for two weeks in the city until the perceived heroes left again for Copenhagen. Here, the two were also received with pomp, described by a young Adam Oehlenschläger:

I marveled at all the lights in the big city and thought I was in a fairy tale from One Thousand and One Nights."

— Adam Oehlenschläger

== Name of the war ==
The Swedish term "Theatre War" reflects the view in later times that the war in practice was a theatrical spectacle rather than a "real" martial conflict.

In Norwegian, the war is known as Tyttebærkrigen after the Norwegian word for the mountain cranberry, in remembrance of how the Norwegian troops, denied assistance by the local population, had to live off the land in berry season.

== See also ==
- Russo-Swedish War (1788–1790)

== References and sources ==
- Georg Apenes, Tyttebærkrigen: det norske felttog i Sverige 1788, 1988.

== Literature ==
- Store norske leksikon retrieved 16 October 2010
- S. A. Sørensen: "Haxthausen, Frederik" article in: Dansk biorgafisk lexikon, Vol. 7. Copenhagen, 1893. pp. 177–179.
- Engberg, Jens (2014). Den standhaftige tinsoldat [The steadfast tin soldier] (in Danish). Politikens Forlag.
