= Christian Kølle =

Norwegian linguist & theologian (1736–1814)

Christian Kølle (15 August 1736 – 30 January 1814) was a Norwegian educator and theologian known for his at-the-time innovative views on written Norwegian that preceded many of the later language reforms.

== Background ==
He was born in Kristiania to government official (kanselliråd) Jens Kølle and his wife Catharine Hermine Juell. He attended the Christiania Cathedral School, enrolled as a student in 1755 and graduated with a cand.theol. degree in 1760. He applied for various clergical positions in Denmark, but was never appointed supposedly because of closeness with the Moravian Church. He instead worked as a private tutor in Kråkstad, Fjære, and Arendal. In 1770 he bought the farm Snarøen and ran his own boarding school.

== Career ==
Kølle wrote several of the textbooks used in his school. In some of these books, he employed linguistic ideas that preceded many actual language reforms in Norway. He emphasized "purely Norwegian" words in books, and argued for more phonemic orthography in the written language. In an anonymous work released in 1785 he introduced the written feminine grammatical gender in Norway, unheard of in the Danish written culture of the day, but often used in orally Norwegian. He also introduced a precursor to the letter "å" instead of "aa". Following the model of the letter ø, which was an o with a slash through it, he chose the character ⱥ (a with a slash through it), to replace aa. Although he preferred to use ⱥ, he used å or aͤ (a with superscript o or e) when this type was not available.

His principles were attacked by J. J. Vangensten in Norway's first newspaper Norske Intelligenz-Sedler, and by Jens Kragh Høst in the Danish Kiøbenhavnske Efterretninger om lærde Sager, both in 1796. A rebuttal by Kølle was printed in both publications in 1797. He was a predecessor of later language reformers, including Rasmus Rask and Knud Knudsen. The letter å eventually became introduced in Norwegian in 1917, and written feminine grammatical gender also became a reality.

Kølle released the topographical pamphlet Kårt Beskrivelse over Snarøen, en liden Gård ved Christiania in 1792. The pamphlet is a useful historical source on Snarøen (now: Snarøya), and also contained a section of farmer's advice. The pamphlet was embedded with an issue of Norske Intelligenz-Sedler. In 1794 he released the Enlightenment-typical book Ær dæt Fårnuftigt at have Religion? åk Vilken av så mange ær dæn Fårnuftigste?. Both publications were written in his own phonemic orthography. In 1805 he released an autobiography.

== Personal life ==
He was married to Elisabeth Monrad (1758–1829), who was a sister of Lars Monrad (1762–1836), owner of a noted pharmacy in Bergen. They had three daughters. One of them, Catharine Hermine Kølle (1788–1859), is known as both the first female hiker and the first female painter in Norway. Christian Kølle sold the farm in 1803, and moved with his family to Kopervik, a place which he considered safer in the event of war. He had intended to move to Strandebarm, then changed his mind, but soon became dissatisfied with Kopervik as well. They moved on to Ulvik in 1805, where he again opened a small learning institution. He died at his farm in 1814, and his wife died in 1829 in Os. In modern times, a road at Snarøya was named after him.
