= Christian Jensen Lofthuus =

Norwegian farmer and revolutionary

- Born: 15 May 1750; Risør, Norway
- Died: 13 June 1797 (aged 47); Akershus Fortress
- Occupation: Farmer
- Known for: Leadership of farmer's revolt

Christian Jensen Lofthuus (15 May 1750 – 13 June 1797) was a Norwegian farmer from Risør, Norway. Between 1786-87, he led a large peasant revolt in Norway which became known as the Lofthusreisingen.

== Biography ==
Lofthus was born in Risør in Nedenes county, Norway. He was the son of an unwed mother from a local farming family and a father of higher social status and started life as a farmer on the Lofthus farm in Vestre Moland just outside Lillesand. Soon, he also had interests in a sawmill and engaged in shipping and trade and had traveled as a skipper to both Denmark and Great Britain. Later, he was being tried and ruined for violating trade restrictions, he became outspoken against the social differences he saw at the root of his problems. He soon became a leader to the local farmers.

In June 1786, he presented a written complaint to Crown Prince Frederik who was then Regent of Denmark-Norway. At that time, Lofthus had been selected by the village as an envoy with a list of complainants on behalf of the common people of the community. Most of the complaints concerned large demands for payment for official business. It was also complained that officials demanded overly high taxes. Moreover, the farmers wanted a repeal of the Danish grain monopoly and a freer timber trade.

Lofthus had an audience with the crown prince twice in June and July 1786, and by his own account he had virtually been given a royal mandate to return home to document the complaints. During the early years of Frederick's regentship, he gave his support to liberal reforms many of which included farm measures. When Lofthus returned to Risør, he claimed to have succeeded with his demands. He repeated this several times, each time with more signatures on the complaints and petitions. When an attempt to arrest him failed, armed peasants rose on 2 October 1786, forcing local officials to grant immunity to Lofthus.

What followed was a back-and-forth of threats of armed conflict, localized armed uprisings, official investigations (confirming several of the complaints made by Lofthus) and the eventual arrest of Lofthus on 15 March 1787. Enevold Falsen (1755–1808), a noted attorney and father of the future Norwegian constitutional writer Christian Magnus Falsen, defended Lofthus in the ensuing trial. However, in 1792 Lofthus received penal servitude for life. He died of a stroke after ten years of captivity in Akershus Fortress in Christiania.

== Legacy ==
Lofthus became inspirational for the national struggle for independence leading up to the events of 1814 in Norway. The Norwegian leftist movement at the time regarded him as a martyr for the Norwegian cause. Henrik Wergeland later wrote passionately of how Lofthus was betrayed by the government (Almuestalsmanden Christian Jensen Lofthuus and sundry-Urolighederne in 1786 and 87 in Nedenes County in Christian Sand Post No. 82-142/1842). In 1914, a memorial stone with inscription was erected to Lofthus on his farm in Vestre Moland. In 2002, a monument by Norwegian artist Gunn Harbitz was raised by the harbour in Lillesand.

== Other sources ==
- Barton, H. Arnold (1986) Scandinavia in the Revolutionary era, 1760-1815 (University of Minnesota Press) ISBN 978-0-8166-1393-9
- Sætra, Gustav and Johnsen, Berit Eide (1998) Kristian Lofthus og hans tid (Kristiansand: Høgskolen i Agder) ISBN 82-7117-352-9
