= Christian Holm (Norwegian politician) =

Norwegian politician (1783–1855)

Christian Holm (1783–1855) was a Norwegian politician.

He was born in 1783 in Østerild, Jutland, Denmark. He came to Norway in 1798, and studied mining from 1807 to 1811. He was hired by Jacob Aall at Nes Works, and was the manager of their mines in Nissedal

He was elected to the Norwegian Parliament in 1832, and as such he served from 1833 to 1835. When local government was created in 1837, Holm was elected the first mayor of Tvedestrand Municipality. He served as mayor from 1837 to 1840 and 1841 to 1842.

Christian Holm married Johanne Ingeborg Rebekka, née Smith, in 1813. One of their grandsons Johan Holm was mayor of Tvedestrand from 1854 to 1856.
