= Johan Bülow Wamberg =

Norwegian politician

Johan Bülow Wamberg (15 May 1786 – 8 June 1852) was a Norwegian politician.

He was born in Hvideseid as the son of Nils Wamberg and his wife Sussanne Sophie Saxe. His father had migrated from Denmark to work as a district stipendiary magistrate. Johan B. Wamberg was to a large degree raised by politician and businessperson Niels Aall. He went on to found his own company in Skien. He was elected to the Norwegian Parliament in 1827, representing the constituency of Skien og Porsgrund. He served only one term.

Around 1830 he was appointed chief customs surveyor in Farsund. He moved to Flekkefjord in 1841 and Kristianssand in 1842, where he stayed until his death.

Wamberg married Hedvig Jørgine Flood, and the couple had eight children. After her death in 1840, Wamberg married Mathilde Petromine Cappelen. They had three children.
