= Catharine Hermine Kølle =

Norwegian writer, artist (1788–1859)

Catharine Hermine Kølle (29 February 1788 – 27 August 1859) was a Norwegian adventurer, writer and artist.

== Biography ==
Catharine Kølle was born at Snarøya in the parish of Bærum in Akershus, Norway. She was one of three daughters of Christian Kølle (1736–1814) and Elisabeth Monrad (1758–1829). Her father was a language teacher and theologian. In 1803 the family moved to Kopervik on the island of Karmøy in the county of Rogaland, Norway. In 1807 the family moved to Holmen in Ulvik in the district of Hardanger, which became the permanent basis for her life. She received the customary education of young ladies from professional families. She later taught German and French, and some Latin and Italian at a small learning institution which had been founded by her father. Her family lived mostly on fruit growing and farming.

She is known principally as a hiker and artist, as well as for her travel journals. Between 1826 and 1858, Catharine Kölle carried out at least fifteen long journeys at home and abroad. She twice traveled by foot to Italy, including trips to Venice in 1841 and Genoa in 1858. She chronicled her travels in journals which provided documentary material about the places she visited. Her travel journals totaling over 400 pages are maintained at the library of the University Museum of Bergen.

She also painted at least 251 watercolor paintings of which over 200 watercolors are also maintained at the University Museum of Bergen. The total list of works contains not only scenes from places she has visited. She also painted the images in the travel descriptions from inaccessible destinations including North America, Guinea, Istanbul, Sri Lanka, and Jakarta. Additionally she painted biblical and mythological scenes. Her works are painted in bright, bold colors. They have a naive expression, with accuracy in description of the topography and architecture.
