= 1754 in Norway =

- Centuries: 16th; 17th; 18th; 19th; 20th
- Decades: 1730s; 1740s; 1750s; 1760s; 1770s
- See also: 1754 in Denmark; List of years in Norway

Events in the year 1754 in Norway.

== Incumbents ==
- Monarch: Frederick V.

== Events ==
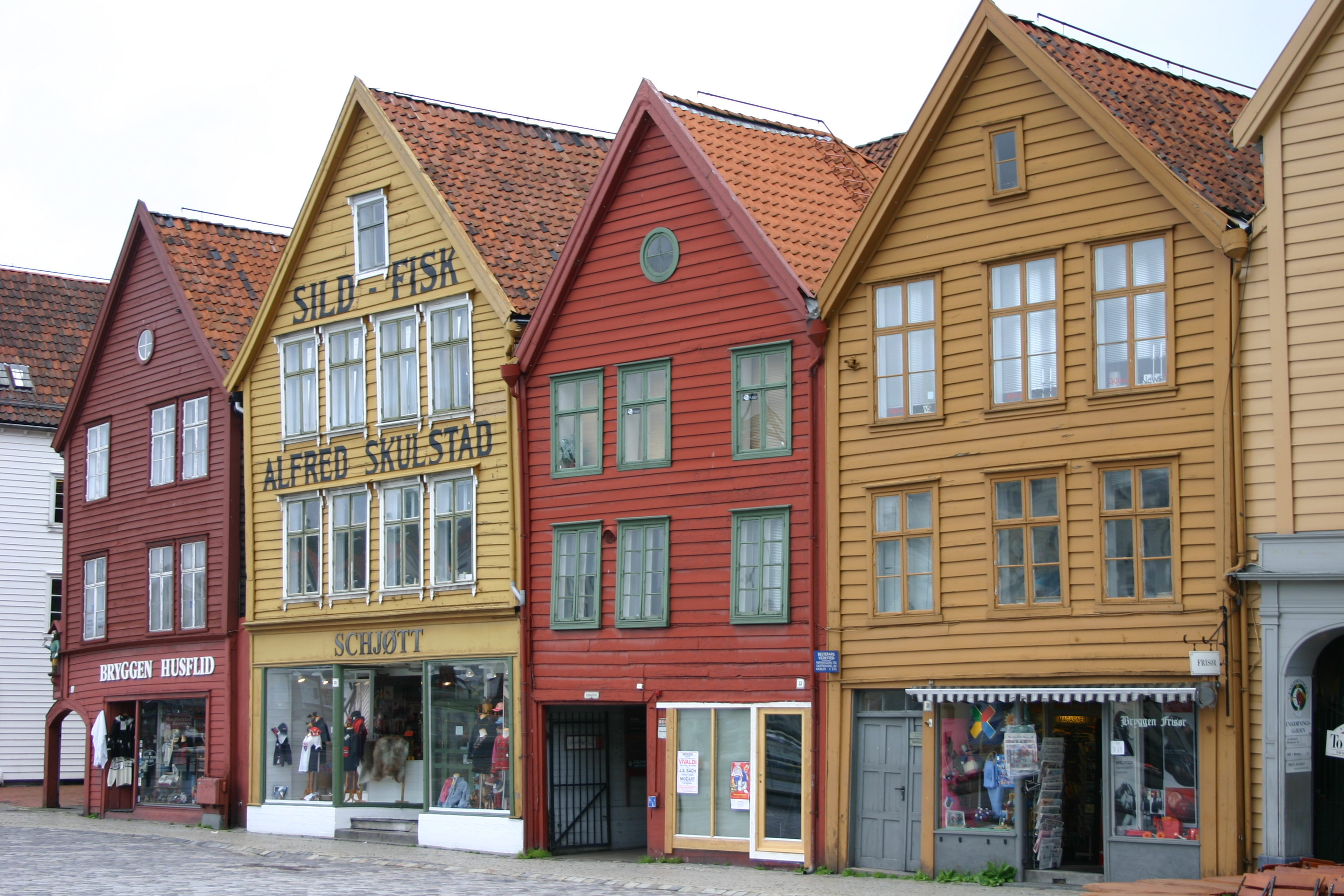
Bryggen

- The Hanseatic League Kontor at Bryggen was closed.
- Saint Thomas, Saint John and Saint Croix were sold to king Frederick V, becoming royal Danish-Norwegian colonies.
- Susanne Monsdatter witch trail in Hordaland, one of the last witch trials in Scandinavia.

== Arts and literature ==
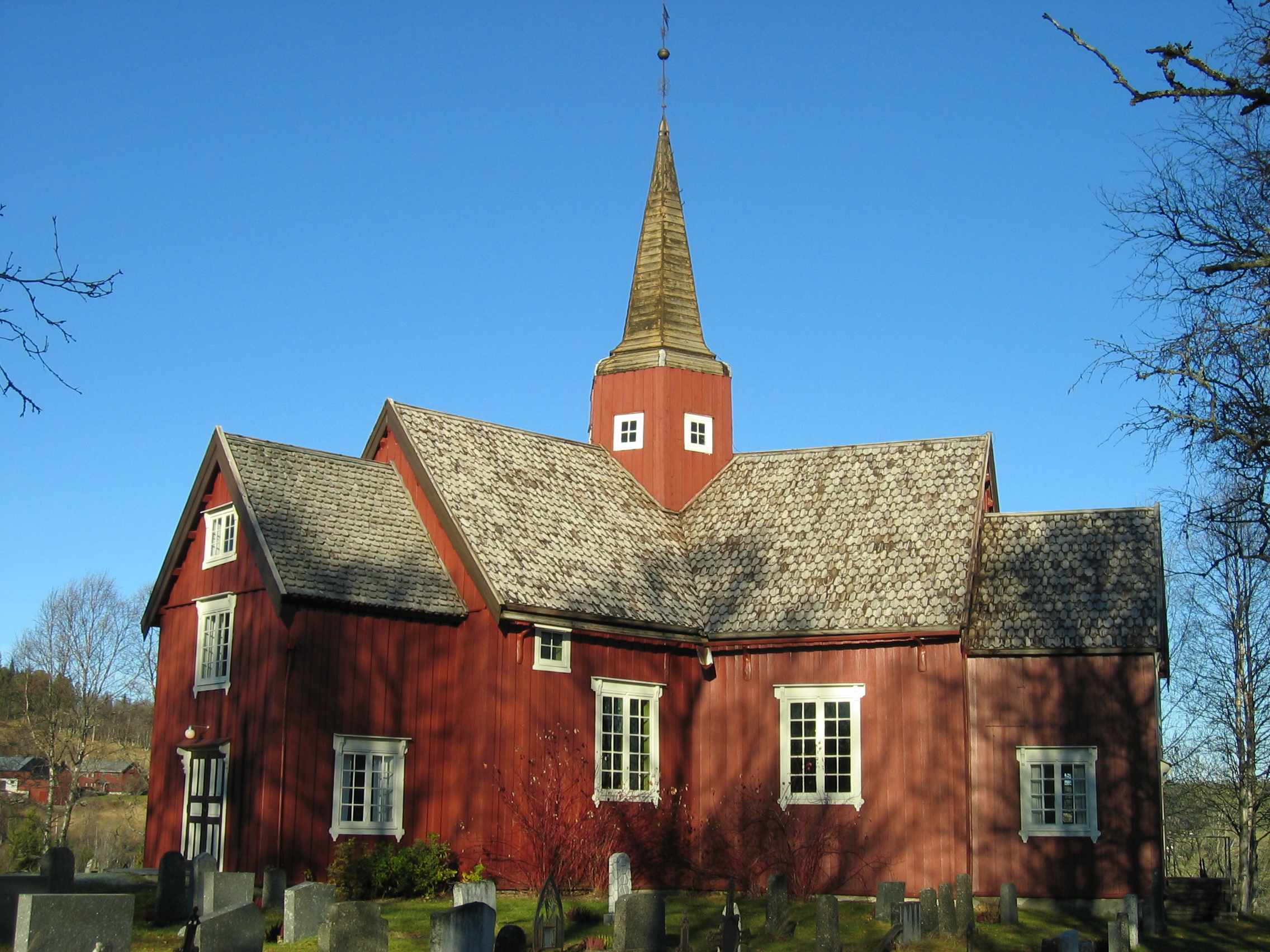
Budal Church

- Budal Church was built.

== Births ==
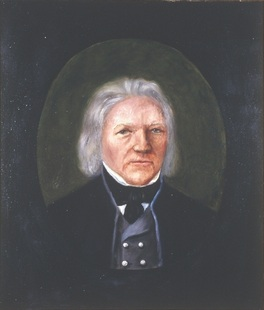
Peder Hjermann

- 4 October – Mathias Bonsak Krogh, bishop and politician (died 1828).

=== Full date unknown ===
- Peder Hjermann, farmer and politician (died 1834).
- Andreas Rogert, jurist and politician (died 1833).

== Deaths ==
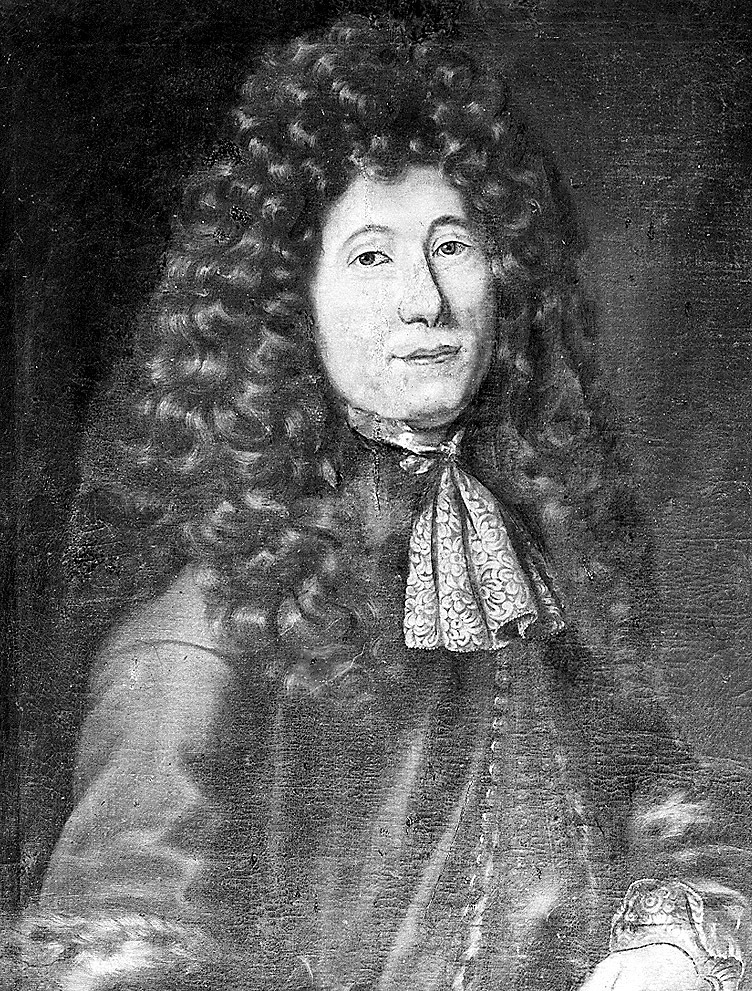
Hans Colbjørnsen

- Hans Colbjørnsen, timber trader and military officer (born c.1675).
- Torsten Ottersen Hoff, sculptor (born c.1688).
