= 1835 in Norway =

- Centuries: 17th; 18th; 19th; 20th; 21st
- Decades: 1810s; 1820s; 1830s; 1840s; 1850s
- See also: 1835 in Sweden; List of years in Norway

Events in the year 1835 in Norway.

== Incumbents ==
- Monarch: Charles III John.
- First Minister: Jonas Collett

== Events ==
- 5 November - Christiania Offentlige Theater burns down.
- 29 November – Population Census: Norway had 1,194,827 inhabitants.
- 1835 Norwegian parliamentary election.

== Births ==
- 15 May – Henrik Mohn, meteorologist (d.1916)
- 11 October – Ernst Sars, historian (1917)

=== Full date unknown ===
- Baard Madsen Haugland, politician (d.1896)
- Olaf Isaachsen, painter (d.1893)
- Nils Trondsen Thune, politician
- August Weenaas, Lutheran minister, founding President of Augsburg University in the USA (d.1924)

== Deaths ==
- 24 March – Ole Olsen Amundrød, farmer, schoolteacher and politician (b. 1771)
- 8 August – Jørgen Mandix, judge (b. 1759).
- 15 September – Henrik Carstensen, businessman, timber merchant and shipowner (b. 1753.
- 26 September – Nils Astrup, politician (b.1778)
- 6 December – Diderik Hegermann, politician and Minister (b.1763)
