= 1844 in Norway =

- Centuries: 17th; 18th; 19th; 20th; 21st
- Decades: 1820s; 1830s; 1840s; 1850s; 1860s
- See also: 1844 in Sweden; List of years in Norway

Events in the year 1844 in Norway.

== Incumbents ==
- Monarch: Charles III John (until 8 March); then Oscar I.
- First Minister: Nicolai Krog

== Events ==
- 8 March – King Oscar I ascends to the throne of Sweden-Norway
- 11–18 July – The 4th Scandinavian Scientist Conference is held in Oslo.

=== Undated ===
- 1844 Norwegian parliamentary election
- Utsira Lighthouse is established.

== Births ==
- 19 February – Mathilde Schjøtt, writer, literary critic, biographer and feminist (died 1926).
- 2 March – Ole Larsen Skattebøl, judge and politician (d.1929)
- 8 March – Jens Jonas Jansen, priest (d.1912)
- 22 March – Sven Oftedal, helped found the Lutheran Free Church (d.1911)
- 23 May – Klaus Hanssen, physician and politician
- 15 July – Thorbjorn N. Mohn, American Lutheran church leader and the first president of St. Olaf College (d. 1899)
- 8 August – Alf Collett, writer (d.1919)
- 11 September – N. O. Nelson, founder of the N. O. Nelson Manufacturing Company (d. 1922)
- 2 October – Peter Harboe Castberg, banker (d.1926)
- 29 December – Brynild Anundsen, founder of Decorah Posten (d.1913)

=== Full date unknown ===
- Oluf Hansen Hagen, politician
- Nils Otto Hesselberg, politician (d.1929)
- Christian Wilhelm Engel Bredal Olssøn, politician and Minister (d.1915)
- Steinar Schjøtt, philologist and lexicographer (d.1920)
- Oscar Wergeland, painter (d.1910)

== Deaths ==
- 4 August – Jacob Aall, historian and statesman (b.1773)
