= 1756 in Norway =

- Centuries: 16th; 17th; 18th; 19th; 20th
- Decades: 1730s; 1740s; 1750s; 1760s; 1770s
- See also: 1756 in Denmark; List of years in Norway

Events in the year 1756 in Norway.

== Incumbents ==
- Monarch: Frederick V.

== Events ==
18 June – 6 July – The Cattle War, in present-day India.

== Births ==
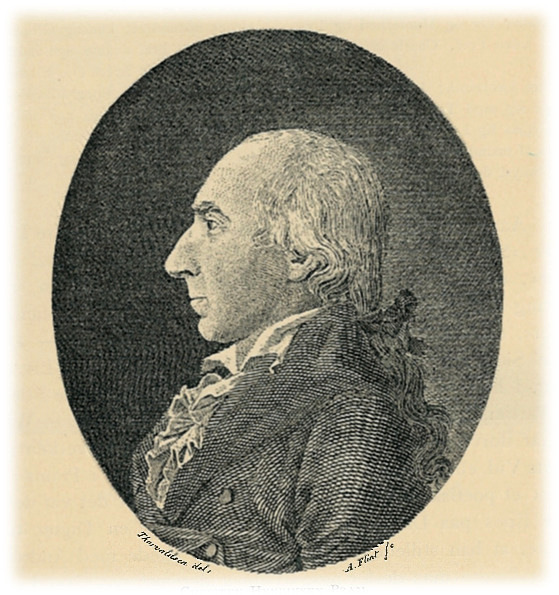
Christen Pram is regarded as the first Norwegian novelist.

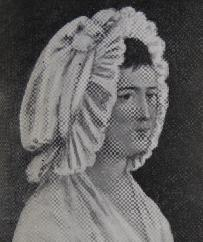
Hilchen Sommerschild

- 4 September – Christen Pram, economist, civil servant, poet, novelist, playwright (died 1821).
- 3 October – Abraham Pihl, clergyman, astronomer and architect (died 1821).

=== Full date unknown ===
- Anders Lysgaard, farmer and politician (died 1827).
- Peter Andreas Heuch, merchant (died 1825).
- Hilchen Sommerschild, first female teacher in Norway (died 1831).

== Deaths ==
- 26 September – Joachim Andreas Stukenbrock, Berghauptmann at the Kongsberg Silver Mines (born 1699).
