= 1842 in Norway =

- Centuries: 17th; 18th; 19th; 20th; 21st
- Decades: 1820s; 1830s; 1840s; 1850s; 1860s
- See also: 1842 in Sweden; List of years in Norway

Events in the year 1842 in Norway.

== Incumbents ==
- Monarch: Charles III John.
- First Minister: Nicolai Krog

== Events ==
- Porsgrunn was granted full city status. Limited city status was granted in 1807.
- Flekkefjord was granted full city status.
- Lillehammer was granted full city status.
- Drøbak was granted full city status.
- The Norwegian Missionary Society was founded in Stavanger.
- The eleventh Storting convened, following the 1841 election.
- The Conventicle Act was repealed.
- The Witchcraft Act (Trolldomslov) is abolished.
- Russian ship of the line Ingermanland sinks outside the coast of Jæren.

== Arts and literature ==
- Ivar Aasen commenced his research on rural dialects all across Norway

== Births ==
=== January to June ===
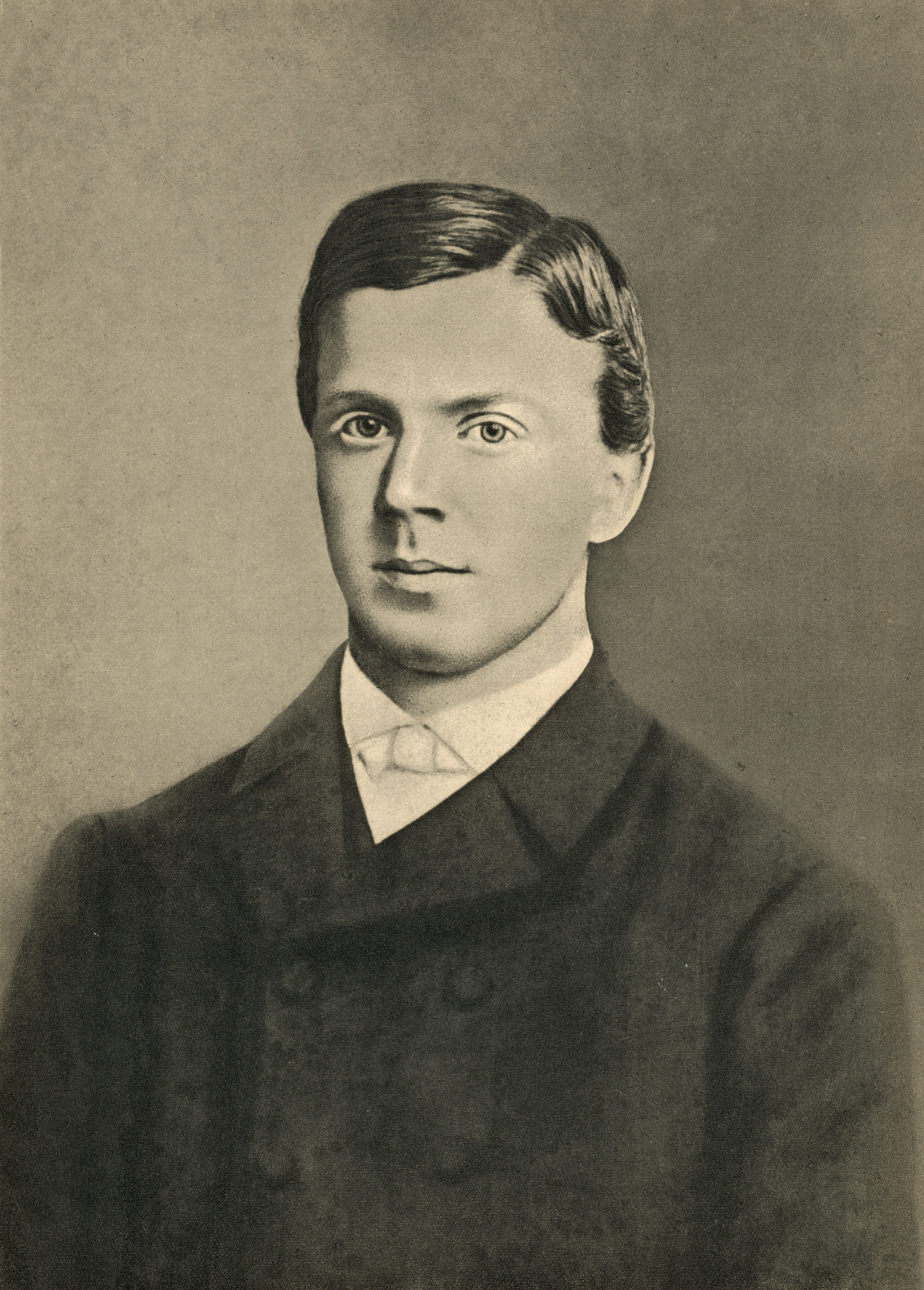
Rikard Nordraak

- 16 March – Theodor Nilsen Stousland, politician (d.1910).
- 1 April – Edmund Neupert, pianist and composer (d.1888)
- 12 June – Rikard Nordraak, composer (d.1866)
- 26 May – Evald Rygh, banker, politician and Minister (d.1913)

=== July to December ===
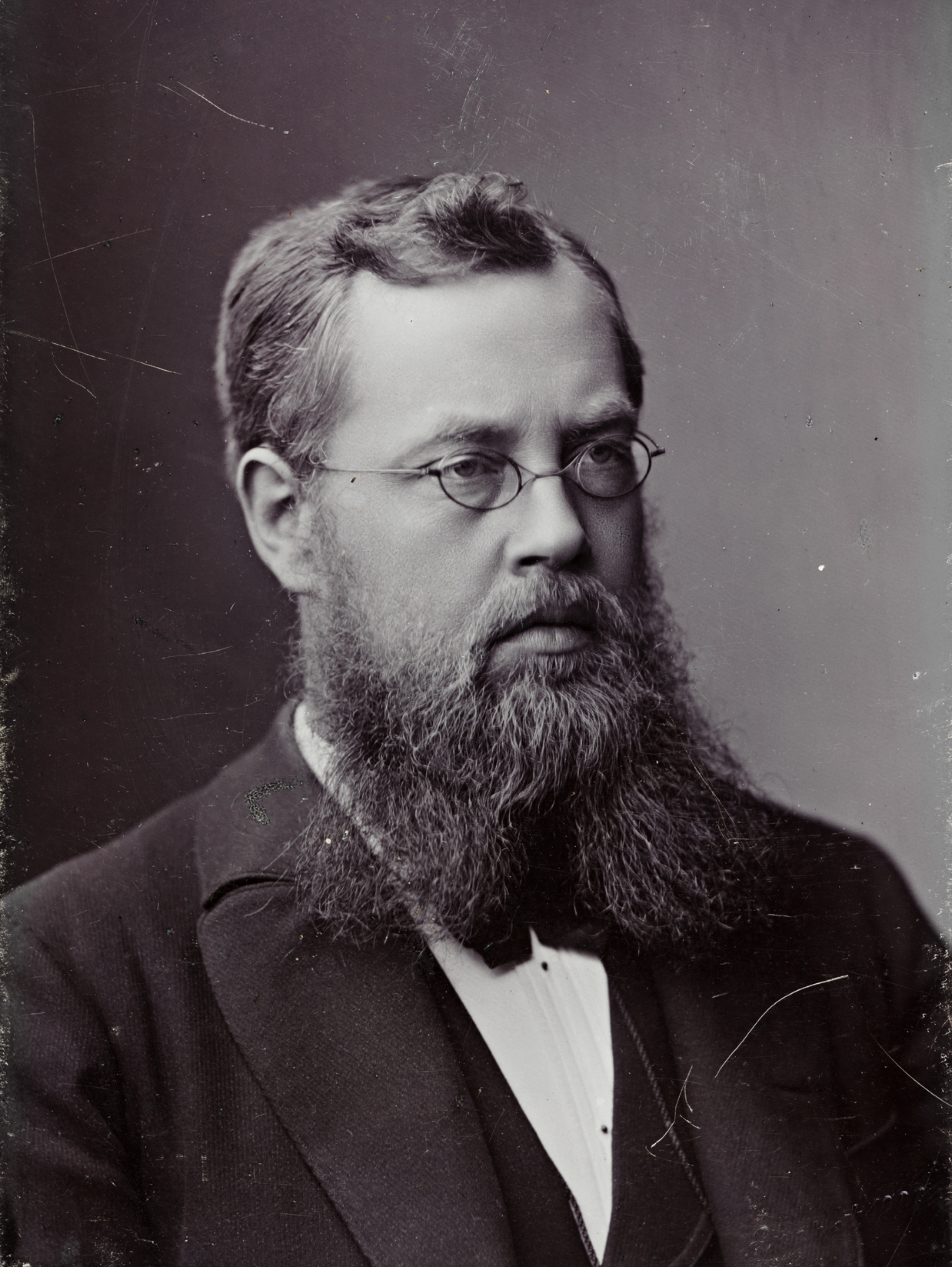
Sophus Lie

- 6 August – Karl Gether Bomhoff, pharmacist, politician and Governor of the Central Bank of Norway (d. 1925).
- 31 August – Ole Bornemann Bull, ophthalmologist (d.1916)
- 2 December – Robert Collett, zoologist (d.1913)
- 16 December – Otto Sinding, painter (d.1909)
- 17 December – Sophus Lie, mathematician (d.1899).

=== Full date unknown ===
- Nils S. Dvergsdal, politician (d.1921)

== Deaths ==
- 16 January – Thomas Fearnley, painter (born 1802).
- 16 March – Maurits Hansen, writer (b.1794)

=== Full date unknown ===
- Henrik Anker Bjerregaard, poet, dramatist and judge (b.1792)
- Wilhelm Jürgensen, military officer (b.1762)
