= List of elections in 1835 =

The following elections occurred in the year 1835.

== Europe ==
- 1835 United Kingdom general election
- 1835 United Kingdom general election in Ireland
- 1835 United Kingdom general election in Wales
- 1835 Belgian general election
- 1835 Norwegian parliamentary election

== See also ==
- Category:1835 elections
