= 1841 in Norway =

- Centuries: 17th; 18th; 19th; 20th; 21st
- Decades: 1820s; 1830s; 1840s; 1850s; 1860s
- See also: 1841 in Sweden; List of years in Norway

Events in the year 1841 in Norway.

== Incumbents ==
- Monarch: Charles III John.
- First Minister: Nicolai Krog

== Events ==
- 27 February – Frederik Due succeeds Severin Løvenskiold as prime minister, when Løvenskiold is appointed Governor-general of Norway.

== Arts and literature ==
- The poem «Vi ere en Nation, vi med» is first published. It was written by Henrik Wergeland.
- The first volume of «Norwegian Folktales» (Norwegian: Norske folkeeventyr) a collection of Norwegian folktales and legends by Peter Christen Asbjørnsen and Jørgen Moe is first published.

== Births ==
- 23 May – Karen Sundt, writer (died 1924).
- 29 July – Gerhard Armauer Hansen, physician (died 1912)
- 21 August – Carl Willoch Ludvig Horn, educator, textbook writer and politician (died 1913).
- 10 September – Thore Torkildsen Foss, politician (died 1913)
- 1 October – Sophus Christian Munk Aars, civil servant and writer (died 1931)
- 27 November – Nikoline Harbitz, author (died 1898).
- 13 December – Olaf Wilhelm Petersen, military officer and sports official (died 1909).

=== Full date unknown ===
- Lars Anton Nicolai Larsen-Naur, politician (died 1896)

== Deaths ==
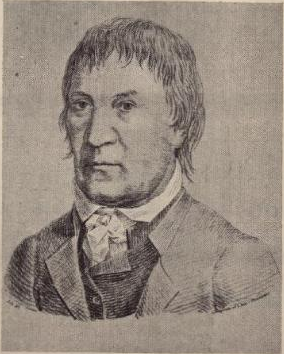
Niels Hertzberg

- 12 June – Hans Jørgen Reutz Synnestvedt, military officer and politician (b. 1777)
- 21 October – Niels Hertzberg, priest and politician (b. 1759).
- 21 November – Thomas Fasting, naval officer and government minister (b. 1769)
- 15 December – Jacob Hersleb Darre, priest, member of the Norwegian Constitutional Assembly (born 1757).

=== Full date unknown ===
- Osmund Andersen Lømsland, farmer and politician (b. 1765)
- Jens Schou Fabricius, politician (b. 1758)
