= 1758 in Norway =

- Centuries: 17th; 18th; 19th; 20th
- Decades: 1730s; 1740s; 1750s; 1760s; 1770s
- See also: 1758 in Denmark; List of years in Norway

Events in the year 1758 in Norway.

== Incumbents ==
- Monarch: Frederick V.

== Events ==
- Kristen Paulsen is condemned to be executed by burning. He was the last person to be burned for sodomy (sex with animals) in Denmark-Norway. He was burned in Kristiansand.
- The gold mines at Gullverket, starts to operate, the mines is operated from 1758 to 1907.

== Arts and literature ==
- The poem Maidagen, by Christian Braunmann Tullin, is first published.

== Births ==
- 3 March – Jens Schou Fabricius, politician (died 1841)
- 15 March – Magdalene Sophie Buchholm, poet (died 1825)
- 23 April – Nils Christian Frederik Hals, military officer (died 1838)

== Deaths ==
- 5 November – Hans Egede, Lutheran missionary (born 1686)
