= 1846 in Norway =

- Centuries: 17th; 18th; 19th; 20th; 21st
- Decades: 1820s; 1830s; 1840s; 1850s; 1860s
- See also: 1846 in Sweden; List of years in Norway

Events in the year 1846 in Norway.

== Incumbents ==
- Monarch: Oscar I.
- First Minister: Nicolai Krog

== Births ==
- 22 February – Peder Nilsen, politician and Minister (d. 1921)
- 4 August – Stephan Sinding, sculptor (d. 1922)
- 5 August – Alvilde Prydz, Norwegian novelist (d. 1922 in Norway)
- 22 August – Amalie Skram, author and feminist (d. 1905)
- 26 September – Sofie Borchgrevink, educator (d. 1911).
- 30 September – Oscar Ambrosius Castberg, painter and sculptor (d. 1917)
- 22 October – Anders Andersen, politician (d. 1931)
- 10 December
  - Ulrikke Dahl, author (d. 1923).
  - Gregers Gram, jurist and politician (d. 1929).
- 15 December
  - Kittel Halvorson, a U.S. Representative from Minnesota (d. 1936)
  - Amunda Kolderup, opera singer (d. 1882).
- 29 December – Rosa Asmundsen, actress and singer (d. 1911).

=== Full date unknown ===
- Hans Konrad Foosnæs, politician and Minister (d. 1917)
- Axel Otto Kristian Hagemann, politician

== Deaths ==
- 28 April – Christen Smed, blacksmith and mountaineer (b. 1797)
