= 1759 in Norway =

- Centuries: 16th; 17th; 18th; 19th; 20th
- Decades: 1730s; 1740s; 1750s; 1760s; 1770s
- See also: 1759 in Denmark; List of years in Norway

Events in the year 1759 in Norway.

== Incumbents ==
- Monarch: Frederick V.

== Events ==
- Gustaf Grüner was appointed commander-in-chief of the Norwegian army.

== Arts and literature ==
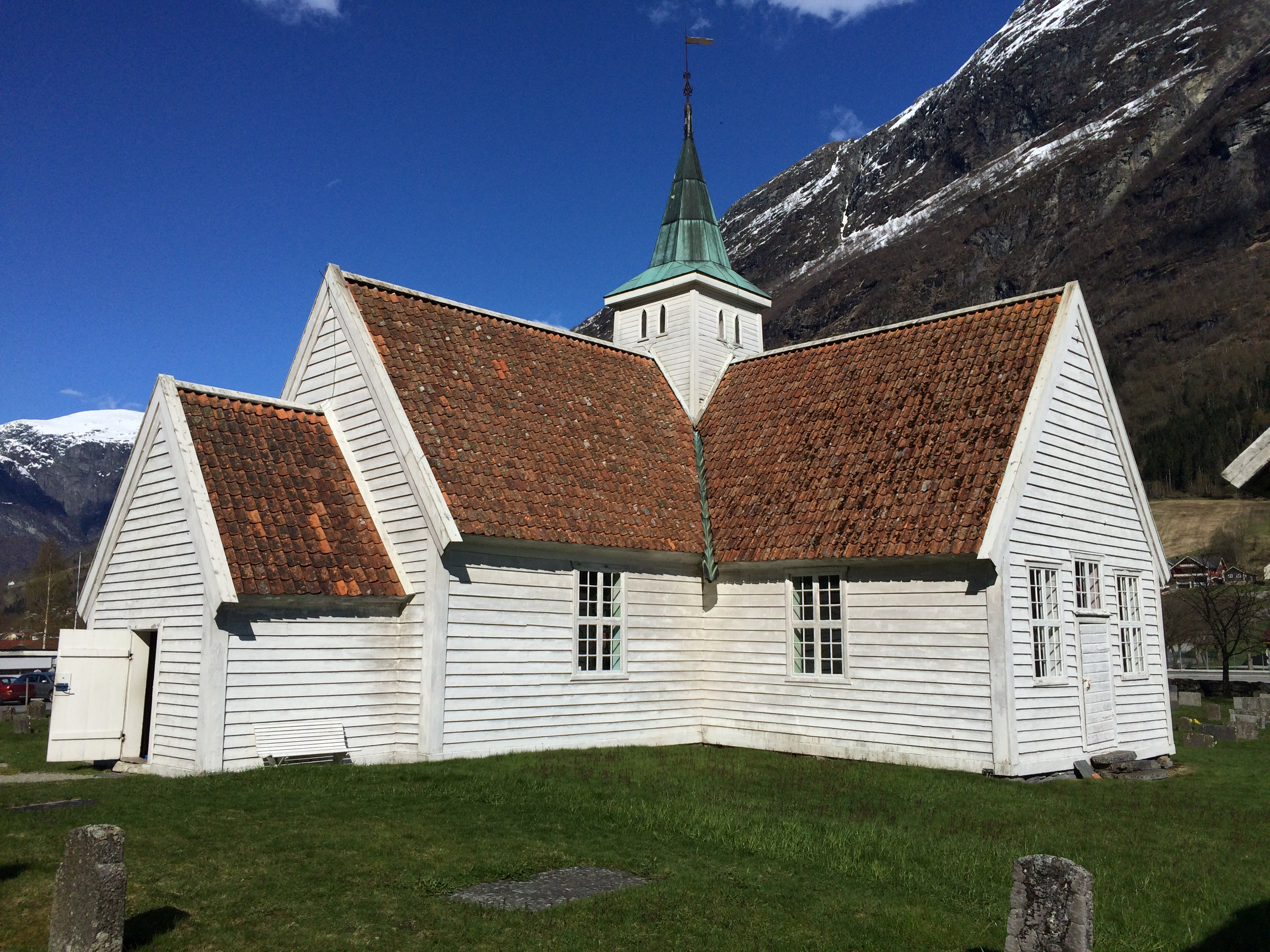
The Old Olden Church

- The Old Olden Church was built.

== Births ==
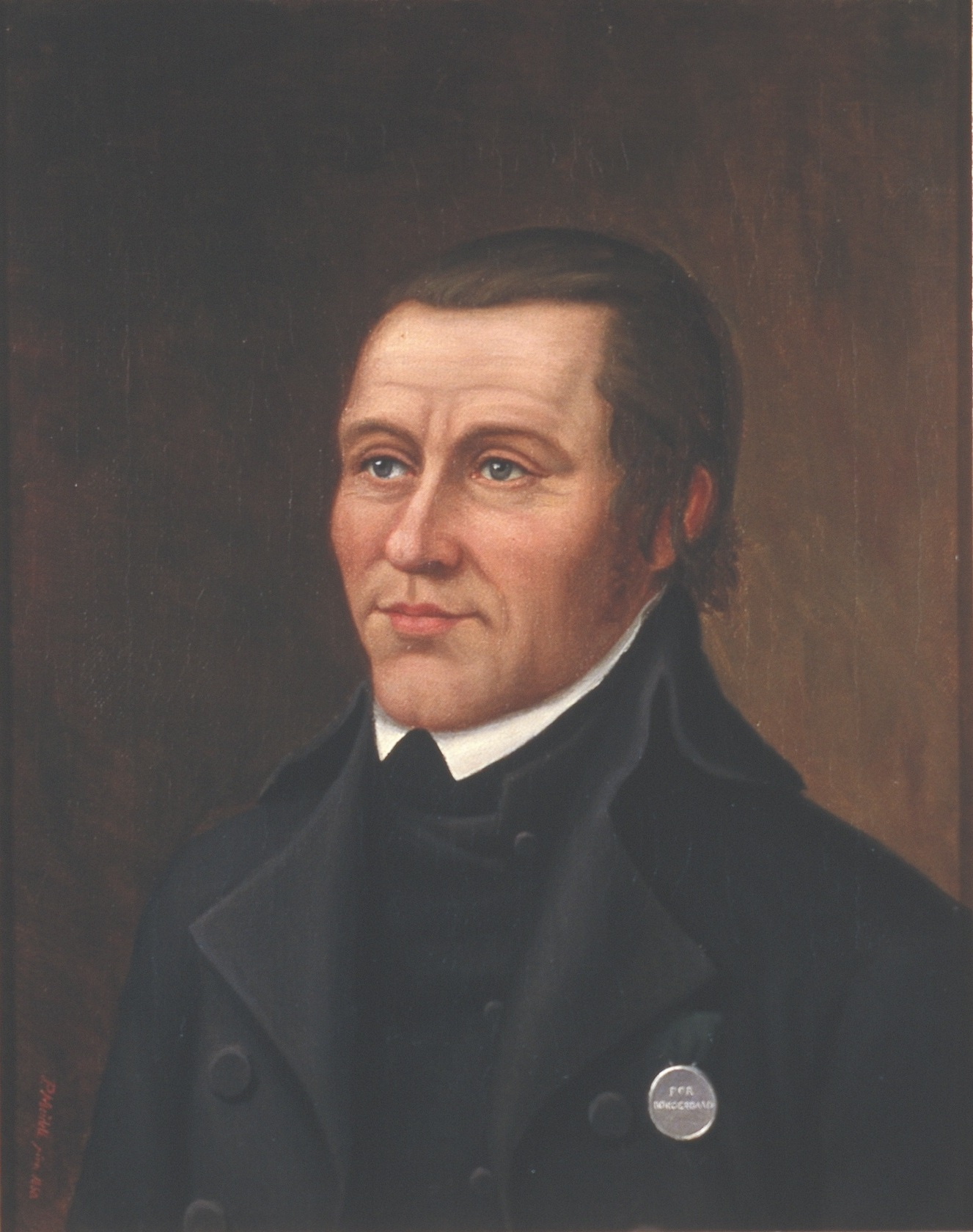
Lars Larsen Forsæth painted by Christopher Pritzier Meidell

- 23 May – Johan Ernst Mowinckel, merchant and consul (died 1816).
- 2 July – Niels Andreas Vibe, military officer (died 1814).
- 2 August – Johan Christopher Haar Daae, priest and politician (died 1827)
- 13 August – Niels Hertzberg, priest and politician (died 1841).
- 23 October – Sivert Aarflot, educator (died 1817).
- 26 October – Haagen Mathiesen, timber merchant (died 1842).
- 9 November – Frederik Petersen, painter (died 1825).
- 30 November – Just Henrik Ely, military officer (died 1824).

=== Full date unknown ===
- Lars Larsen Forsæth, farmer and politician (died 1839).

== Deaths ==
- 8 January – Rasmus Paludan, bishop (b. 1702).
- 24 March – Mathias Collett, civil servant (b. 1708).
