= 1840 in Norway =

- Centuries: 17th; 18th; 19th; 20th; 21st
- Decades: 1820s; 1830s; 1840s; 1850s; 1860s
- See also: 1840 in Sweden; List of years in Norway

Events in the year 1840 in Norway.

== Incumbents ==
- Monarch: Charles III John.
- First Minister: Nicolai Krog

== Events ==
- Melhus Sparebank was established, it is one of Norway’s oldest savings banks.

== Arts and literature ==
- The beginning of the Norwegian romantic nationalism movement.

== Births ==
- 3 January – Cathinka Guldberg, Norway's first nurse (d.1919)
- 14 February – Lars Olsen Skrefsrud, missionary and language researcher in India (d.1910)
- 30 September – Johan Svendsen, composer, conductor and violinist (d.1911)
- 7 November – H. G. Haugan, Norwegian-born American railroad executive.

=== Full date unknown ===
- Karl Akre, politician
- Anton Christian Bang, politician (d.1913)
- Hans Laurits Olsen Hammerstad, politician
- Anders Sveaas, businessperson and consul (d.1917)

== Deaths ==
- 28 August – Caspar Peter Hagerup, civil servant (b.1777)

=== Full date unknown ===
- Even Hansen, civil servant and politician (born 1790)
- Mads Lauritz Madsen, politician (born 1782)
- Peder Paulsen Balke, farmer and politician (born 1779).
