= 1838 in Norway =

- Centuries: 17th; 18th; 19th; 20th; 21st
- Decades: 1810s; 1820s; 1830s; 1840s; 1850s
- See also: 1838 in Sweden; List of years in Norway

Events in the year 1838 in Norway.

== Incumbents ==
- Monarch: Charles III John.
- First Minister: Nicolai Krog

== Events ==
- 1 January – Fulfilling a law from 1837 all parishes form the bases for the establishment of altogether 396 formannskapsdistrikts, the precursor of municipalities.

== Births ==
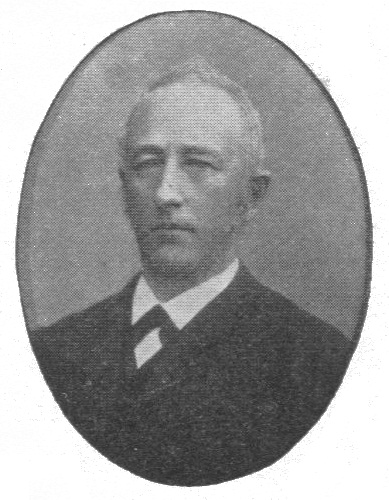
Jacob Aall Bonnevie

- 10 January – Johan Christopher Brun, pharmacist and politician (d.1914)
- 12 March – Johan Gerhard Theodor Ameln, politician (d.1917)
- 23 March – Johan Christian Heuch, bishop and politician (d.1904)
- 28 December – Albert Marius Jacobsen, military officer and politician (d.1909)
- 31 December – Jacob Aall Bonnevie, politician and Minister (d.1904)

=== Full date unknown ===
- Ludvig Aubert, politician and Minister (d.1896)
- Edvard Hans Hoff, politician and Minister (d.1933)
- Christian Johansen Ihlen, politician
- Ole C. Johnson, soldier in the American Civil War (d.1886)
- Anders Nicolai Kiær, statistician (d.1919)
- Christian Homann Schweigaard, politician and Prime Minister (d.1899)

== Deaths ==
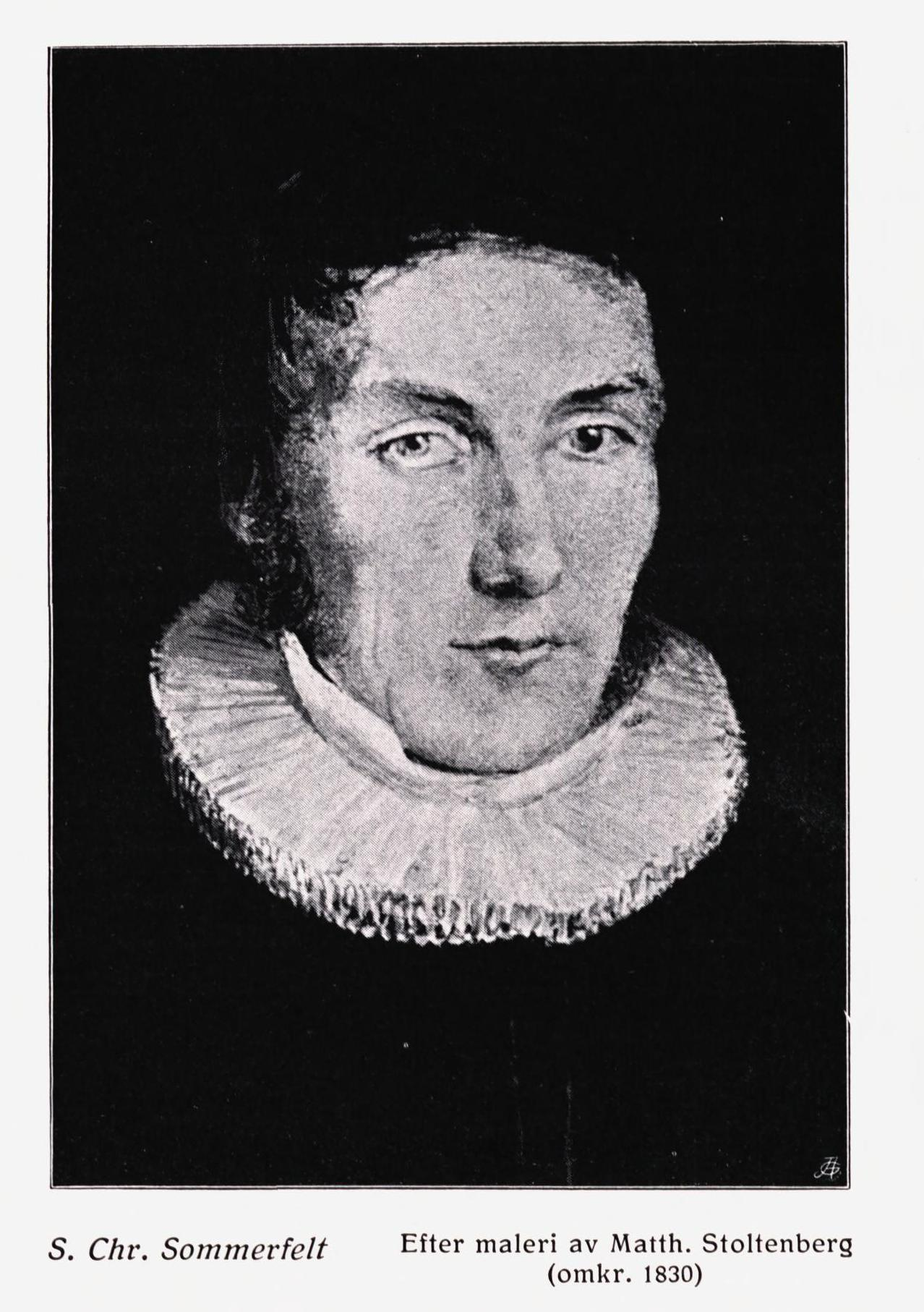
Søren Christian Sommerfelt

- 10 March – Jonas Greger Walnum, politician (b.1771)
- 27 June - Nils Christian Frederik Hals, military officer (b.1758)
- 20 November - Syvert Amundsen Eeg, farmer and politician (b.1757).
- 29 December – Søren Christian Sommerfelt, priest and botanist (b. 1794).
