= Trondsen =

Trondsen is a surname. Notable people with the name include:

- Anders Trondsen (born 1995), Norwegian footballer
- Erling Trondsen (born 1959), Norwegian swimmer
- Johan Trondsen (1922–2018), Norwegian politician
- Christoffer Trondsen Rustung (c. 1500–1565), Norwegian admiral
- Nils Trondsen Thune (1835–??), Norwegian politician
- Trond Trondsen (born 1994), Norwegian cyclist
