= List of elections in 1841 =

The following elections occurred in the year 1841.

- 1841 Belgian general election
- 1841 Chilean presidential election
- 1841 Norwegian parliamentary election

== Europe ==
=== United Kingdom ===
- 1841 United Kingdom general election

== See also ==
- Category:1841 elections
