= 1752 in Norway =

- Centuries: 16th; 17th; 18th; 19th; 20th
- Decades: 1730s; 1740s; 1750s; 1760s; 1770s
- See also: 1752 in Denmark; List of years in Norway

Events in the year 1752 in Norway.

== Incumbents ==
- Monarch: Frederick V.

== Events ==
- 10 November – Holmestrand received city rights.
- Seminarium Lapponicum established in Trondheim, a school for preparing teachers to teach in Sami language.

== Births ==
- Jens Holmboe, bailiff (died 1839).
