= Russian ship of the line Ingermanland (1842) =

Full-rigged ship of the line of the Imperial Russian Navy

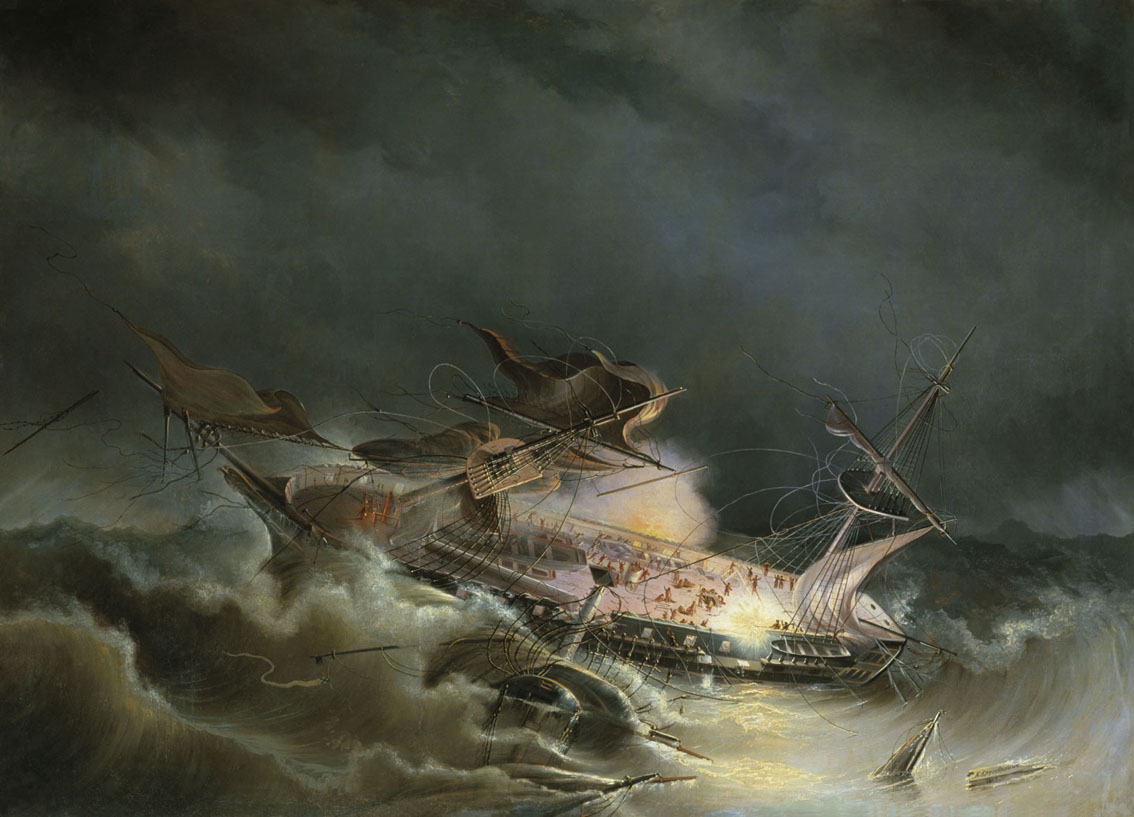
- The wreck of the Ingermanland off the coast of Norway (Painting by KV Krugovilin, 1843)

History

Russian Empire
- Name: Ингерманланд (Ingermanland)
- Namesake: Ingria
- Builder: Solombalskaya Shipyards, Arkhangelsk
- Laid down: 11 September, 1840
- Launched: 24 May, 1842
- In service: 1842
- Fate: Hit by a storm, grounded off Kristiansand and sank off Varhaug, Norway

General characteristics
- Type: 74-gun, three-masted ship of the line
- Length: 54.3 m (178.1 ft) (p/p)
- Beam: 14.6 m (47.9 ft)
- Draft: 6 m (19.7 ft)
- Sail plan: Full-rigged ship

Ingermanland (Russian: Ингерманланд) was a three-masted, fully-rigged Iezekiil‘-class third-rate ship of the line, built in Arkhangelsk, Russia, in 1842. She was intended for service in the Imperial Russian Navy′s Baltic Fleet. Ships of this type were characterized by good seaworthiness, practical location of guns, and rational interior planning. The ship was armed with seventy-four 24- and 36-pound cannons.

== Fatal maiden voyage ==
On August 8, 1842, the ship left Arkhangelsk on her maiden voyage. To reach her destination of Kronstadt in the Gulf of Finland, she had to make a rough voyage through the White Sea, Barents Sea, Norwegian Sea, North Sea, Skagerrak, and Baltic Sea. On board were just under 900 people (the sources vary in their numbers), mainly male crew, with food and supplies for the sea voyage.

The ship met its destiny along the south coast of Norway. Off Lindesnes, the ship encountered a severe storm. Off Kristiansand in the strait of Skagerrak, Ingermanland sailed with Oksøy Lighthouse on the port side in the conviction that the light of the lighthouse was the lantern on another ship. The crew thought they were far from shore, but shortly after, the ship grounded on the islet of Grønningen at about 10 o'clock on the evening on September 11 (Sunday). After the grounding, the ship was refloated by high waves and drifted to the west with the wind. The crew fired the cannons as a distress signal. The alarm was heard, but would-be rescue vessels had to give up because they could not keep up with the ship in the strong wind. Next contact was off Mandal, where pilot vessels and other local ships managed to rescue a total of 15 people. The ship continued drifting westward while local vessels followed. Rescuers again reached her, rescuing another 183, and later another 120, people. A lifeboat with 19 people aboard – among them Captain Treskin – was picked up off Lista. A boat with 15 people on board was picked up by a ship in the Skagerrak and taken to Copenhagen, Denmark. Another lifeboat with 10 people on board was driven ashore on Eigerøy and one officer was picked up by pilots from Stavanger. Ingermanland finally sank off Varhaug.

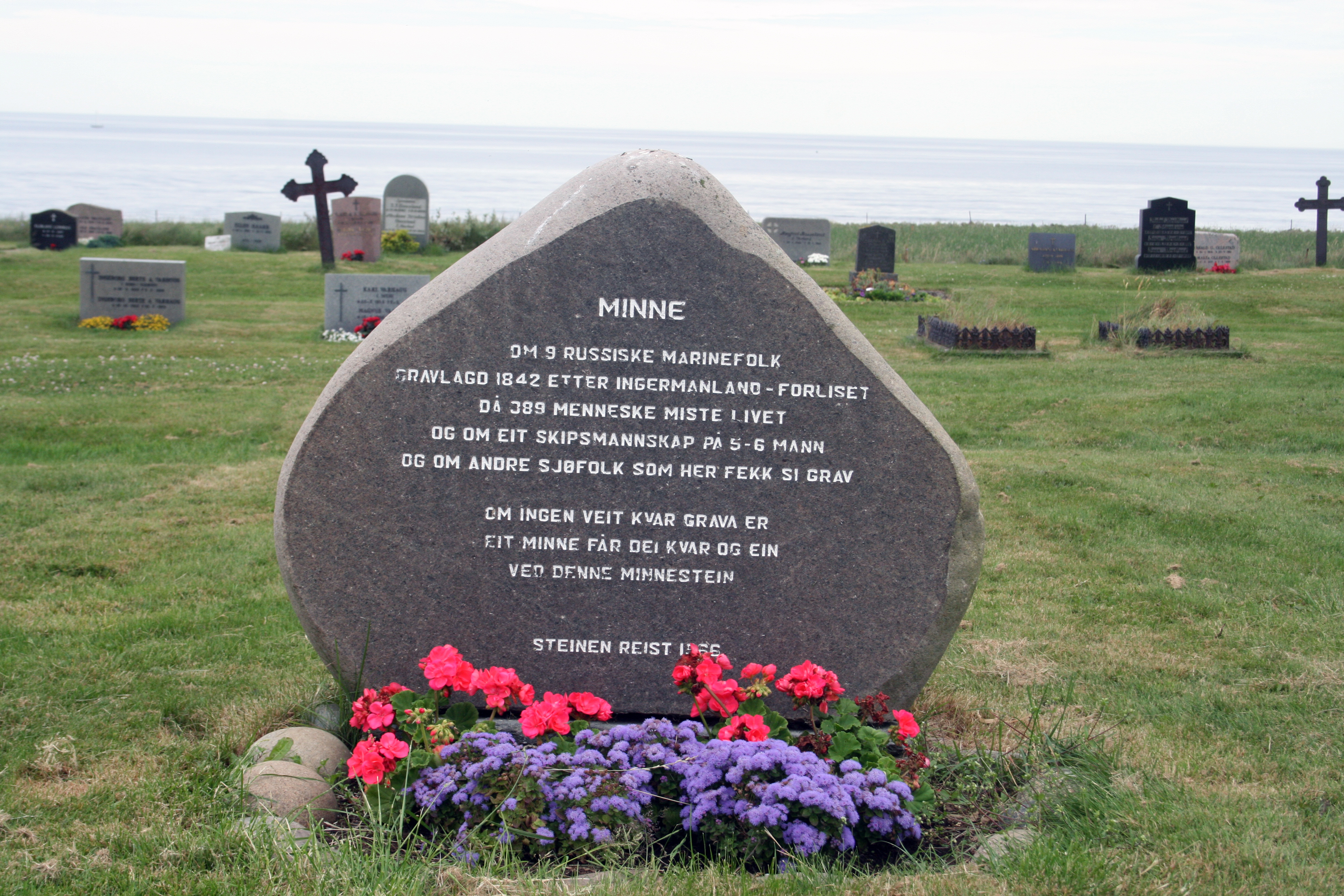
The memorial in Varhaug

Altogether, 503 people were rescued from the ship and 389 were reported dead. Other sources reported 505 rescued and 387 killed. Among the fatalities were 21 women (seven women survived) and seven children (one child survived). At the old cemetery in Varhaug Church, a memorial stone has been erected for the casualties of the disaster.
