= 1755 in Norway =

- Centuries: 16th; 17th; 18th; 19th; 20th
- Decades: 1730s; 1740s; 1750s; 1760s; 1770s
- See also: 1755 in Denmark; List of years in Norway

Events in the year 1755 in Norway.

== Incumbents ==
- Monarch: Frederick V.

== Events ==
- Hurdal glassverk is established in Hurdal.
- 19 December – Bredo Munthe of Bekkeskov was ennobled, and given the noble family name Munthe af Morgenstierne.

== Births ==
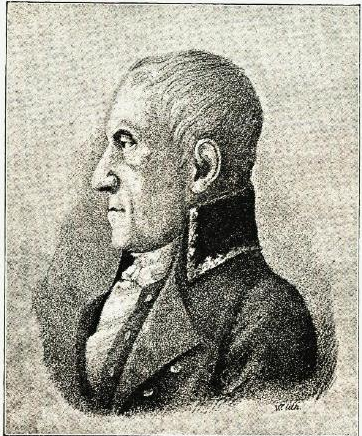
Enevold De Falsen

- 17 October (in Copenhagen, Denmark) - Envold de Falsen, lawyer, poet, actor and statesman (died 1808).
