= 1750 in Norway =

- Centuries: 16th; 17th; 18th; 19th; 20th
- Decades: 1730s; 1740s; 1750s; 1760s; 1770s
- See also: 1750 in Denmark; List of years in Norway

Events in the year 1750 in Norway.

== Incumbents ==
- Monarch: Frederick V.

== Events ==
- 11 September - Jacob Benzon is appointed Vice Steward of Norway.
- 16 December - The Norwegian Military Academy is founded.
- The construction of Fredriksvern naval base was finished.

== Arts and literature ==
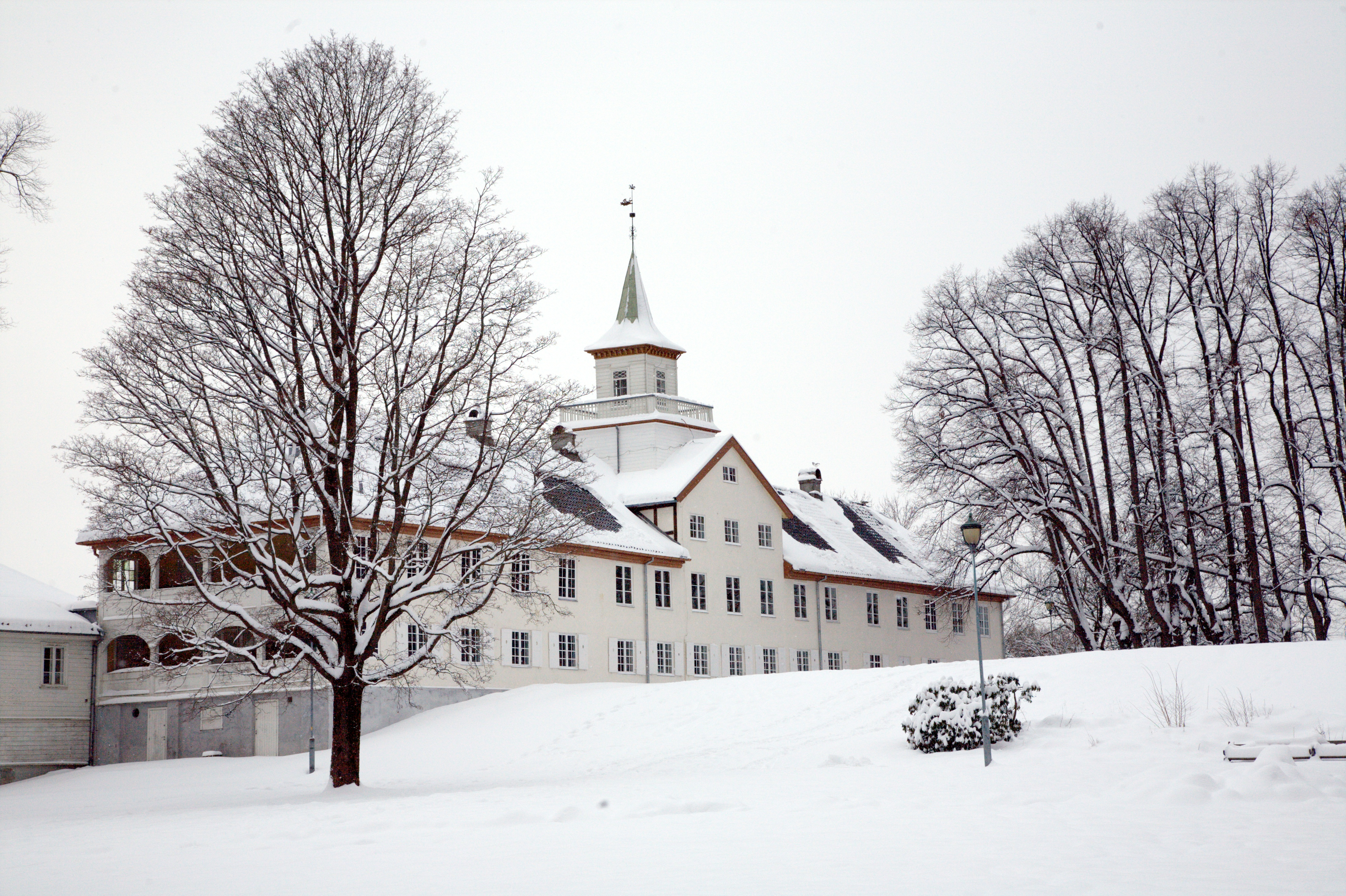
Frogner Manor.

- The construction of Frogner Manor is finished.
- The oldest written account of Selma, a legendary sea serpent in Lake Seljord.

== Births ==
- 15 May - Christian Jensen Lofthuus, revolutionary peasant leader (died 1797)
