= Dominicus Nagell Lemvig Brun =

Norwegian military officer and politician

Dominicus Nagell Lemvig Brun (1 November 1790 – 20 February 1874) was a Norwegian military officer and politician.

He was born in Aafjorden to Ole Brun and his wife Catharina Hedevig Thombsen. He married Christine Lund Finckenhagen in 1816.

He was a military officer by profession. He was also elected to the Norwegian Parliament in 1845, 1848 and 1851, representing the constituency of Romsdals Amt. Before the latter term he had been promoted from captain to lieutenant colonel.

After retirement, he moved to Strinda Municipality where he later died.
