= 1843 in Norway =

- Centuries: 17th; 18th; 19th; 20th; 21st
- Decades: 1820s; 1830s; 1840s; 1850s; 1860s
- See also: 1843 in Sweden; List of years in Norway

Events in the year 1843 in Norway.

== Incumbents ==
- Monarch: Charles III John.
- First Minister: Nicolai Krog

== Events ==
- 14 September – 2/3 of the town of Egersund burns down.

== Births ==
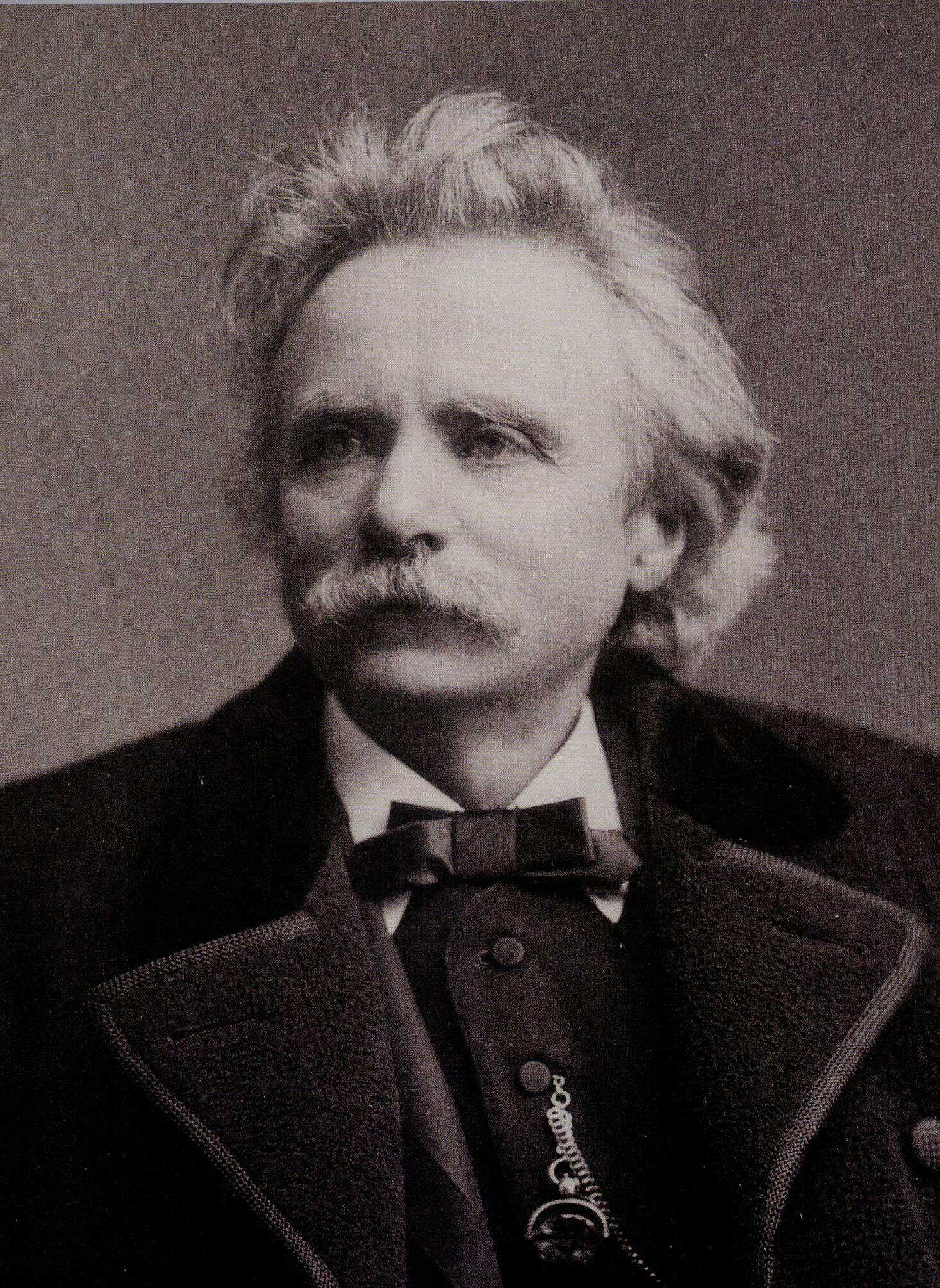
Edvard Grieg

- 5 January – Jørgen Christian Knudsen, ship-owner and politician (b. 1922)
- 8 January – Johan Jeremiassen, ship-owner, consul and politician (d. 1889)
- 2 February – Knute Nelson, Governor of Minnesota from 1893 till 1895 and United States Senator from Minnesota from 1895 till 1923. (d. 1923)
- 6 April – Anders Løwlie, distiller and sports executive (died 1924).
- 9 April – Canute R. Matson, Norwegian American Sheriff of Cook County, Illinois at the time of the Haymarket Square Riot (d. 1903)
- 6 June – Henriette Wulfsberg, school owner and writer (d. 1906)
- 15 June – Edvard Grieg, composer and pianist (d. 1907)
- 24 June – Konrad Dahl, writer and priest (d. 1931)
- 18 August – Johan Henrik Paasche Thorne, businessperson and politician (d. 1920)
- 4 October – Christopher Knudsen, priest, politician and Minister (d. 1915)
- 8 October – Kitty Lange Kielland, painter (d. 1914)
- 31 October – Oscar Nissen, physician, newspaper editor and politician (d. 1911)

=== Full date unknown ===
- Axel Gudbrand Blytt, botanist (d. 1898)
- Yngvar Nielsen, historian and geographer (d. 1916)
- Herman Johan Foss Reimers, politician and Minister (d. 1928)
- Theodor Løvstad, musician, magazine editor (d. 1913).

== Deaths ==
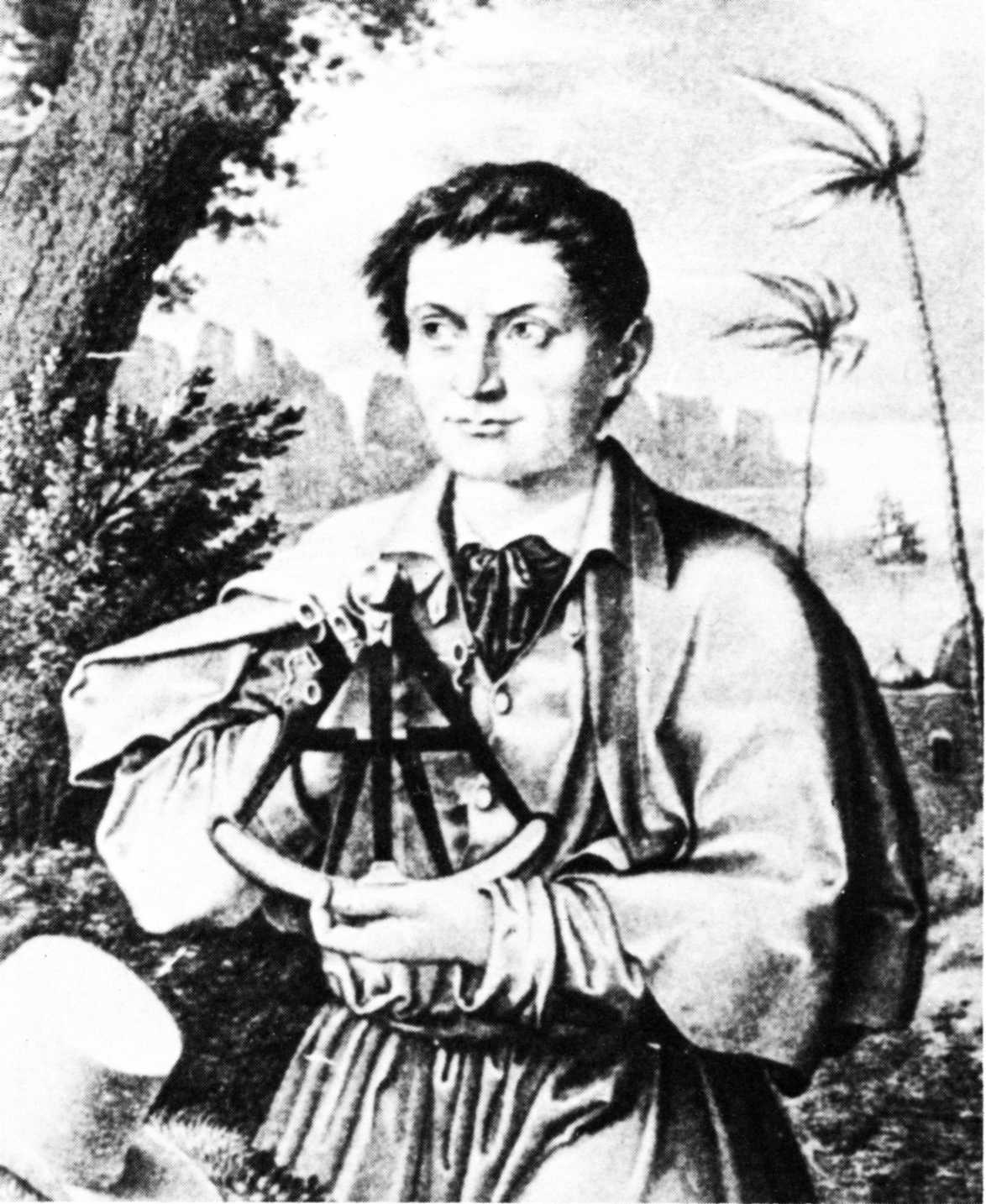
Mensen Ernst

- 17 March – Lars Andreas Oftedahl, priest and politician (b. 1781)
- 13 June – Ole Edvard Buck, politician (b. 1799)

=== Full date unknown ===
- Mensen Ernst, road runner and ultramarathoner (b. 1795)
