= 1751 in Norway =

- Centuries: 16th; 17th; 18th; 19th; 20th
- Decades: 1730s; 1740s; 1750s; 1760s; 1770s
- See also: 1751 in Denmark; List of years in Norway

Events in the year 1751 in Norway.

== Incumbents ==
- Monarch: Frederick V.

== Events ==
- 21 September - Stromstad Treaty of 1751 is signed, it defined the border between Sweden and Norway.
  - The Lapp Codicil of 1751 (addendum to the Stromstad Treaty) secures the right of the Sami people to continue their nomadic lifestyle between the borders.

== Births ==
=== Full date unknown ===
- Johan Lausen Bull, jurist and politician (died 1817)
- Niels Treschow, philosopher and politician (died 1833)

== Deaths ==
- 23 January – Peter Schnitler, jurist and military officer (born 1690).
