= 1749 in Norway =

- Centuries: 16th; 17th; 18th; 19th; 20th
- Decades: 1720s; 1730s; 1740s; 1750s; 1760s
- See also: 1749 in Denmark; List of years in Norway

Events in the year 1749 in Norway.

== Incumbents ==
- Monarch: Frederick V.

== Events ==
- 24 June - The first Masonic lodge is established in Norway (Lodge St. Olaus to the white Leopard).

== Arts and literature ==
- Lesja Church was built.

== Births ==
- 29 January - Christian Colbjørnsen, chief justice (died 1814)
- 18 March - Maren Juel, landowner (died 1815)
- 29 April - Johan Randulf Bull, judge (died 1829)
- 21 August - Edvard Storm, poet (died 1794)
- 8 December - Peder Anker, businessman and politician (died 1824)
