= 1753 in Norway =

- Centuries: 16th; 17th; 18th; 19th; 20th
- Decades: 1730s; 1740s; 1750s; 1760s; 1770s
- See also: 1753 in Denmark; List of years in Norway

Events in the year 1753 in Norway.

== Incumbents ==
- Monarch: Frederick V.

== Events ==
- The merchant Thomas Fearnley migrated from Hull in England to Frederikshald, establishing the Fearnley family in Norway.

== Births ==
- 2 September - Johan Michael Lund, lawyer and Prime Minister of the Faroe Islands (died 1824)
- 30 October - Henrik Carstensen, businessman, timber merchant and shipowner (died 1835).

== Deaths ==
- 4 November – Iver Elieson, merchant (born 1683).
