= 1757 in Norway =

- Centuries: 16th; 17th; 18th; 19th; 20th
- Decades: 1730s; 1740s; 1750s; 1760s; 1770s
- See also: 1757 in Denmark; List of years in Norway

Events in the year 1757 in Norway.

== Incumbents ==
- Monarch: Frederick V.

== Events ==
- Kongsberg School of Mines was established.

== Births ==
- 20 November – Jacob Hersleb Darre, priest, member of the Norwegian Constitutional Assembly (died 1841).

=== Full date missing ===
- Hans Nicolai Arctander, county governor of Frederiksborg County (died 1837)
- Syvert Omundsen Eeg, farmer and politician (died 1838).
