= Melchior Schjelderup Olsson Fuhr =

Norwegian politician (1790–1869)

Melchior Schjelderup Olsson Fuhr (1790–1869) was a Norwegian politician.

He was elected to the Norwegian Parliament in 1836 and 1842, representing the rural constituency of Nordre Bergenhus Amt. He worked as a farmer. He was also a deputy representative in 1839.

He hailed from Lyster, and became the first mayor of Lyster Municipality in 1838.
