= Enodden =

Village in Midtre Gauldal Municipality, Norway

Enodden Odden
- Village
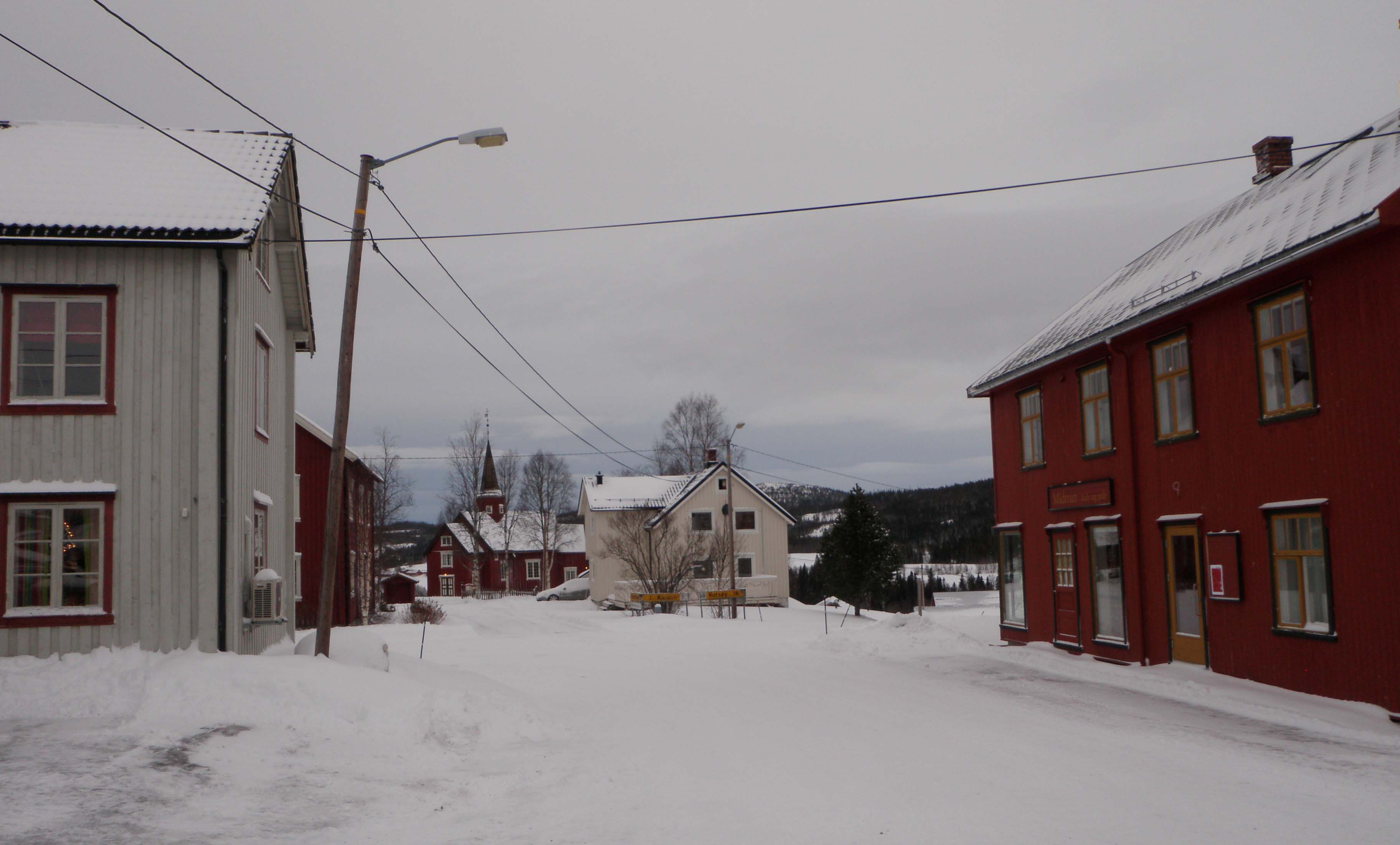
- View of the village with Budal Church in the distance
- Interactive map of Enodden
- Location within Trøndelag Location within Norway
- Coordinates: 62.8842°N 10.4836°E
- Country: Norway
- Region: Central Norway
- County: Trøndelag
- District: Gauldalen
- Municipality: Midtre Gauldal Municipality
- Elevation: 492 m (1,614 ft)
- Time zone: UTC+01:00 (CET)
  - Summer (DST): UTC+02:00 (CEST)
- Post Code: 7298 Budalen

Enodden is a village in Midtre Gauldal Municipality in Trøndelag county, Norway. It is located at the confluence of the rivers Bua and Ena, about 20 kilometres (12 mi) south of the village of Rognes. It is located in the Budalen valley, about 15 kilometres (9.3 mi) north of the Forollhogna National Park. Enodden was the administrative center of the old Budal Municipality which existed from 1879 until 1974. Budal Church is located in Enodden.
