= 1839 in Norway =

- Centuries: 17th; 18th; 19th; 20th; 21st
- Decades: 1810s; 1820s; 1830s; 1840s; 1850s
- See also: 1839 in Sweden; List of years in Norway

Events in the year 1839 in Norway.

== Incumbents ==
- Monarch: Charles III John.
- First Minister: Nicolai Krog

== Arts and literature ==
- Det Dramatiske Selskab in Hammerfest was founded.
- Maurits Hansen wrote the world's first crime novel with "Mordet på Maskinbygger Roolfsen" (The Murder of Engine Maker Roolfsen).

== Births ==
- 25 March – Frederik Collett, painter (d.1914).
- 7 June – Karl Ditlev Rygh, archaeologist and politician (d.1915)
- 12 June – Theodor Peterson, businessperson and politician (d.1888)
- 23 December – Carl Otto Løvenskiold, naval officer, politician and land owner (died 1916).

=== Full date unknown ===
- Walter Scott Dahl, politician and Minister (d.1906)
- Ole Falck Ebbell, architect (d.1919)
- Lars Knutson Liestøl, politician and Minister (d.1912)

== Deaths ==
- 10 June – Jacob Munch, painter and military officer (b.1776)
- 2 December – Andreas Landmark, politician (b.1769)

=== Full date unknown ===
- Jens Esmark, mountain climber and professor of mineralogy (born 1763)
- Peder Tonning, politician (born 1782)
- Lars Larsen Forsæth, farmer and politician (born 1759).
