= Grønningen Lighthouse =

Coastal lighthouse in Norway

Grønningen Lighthouse Grønningen fyr
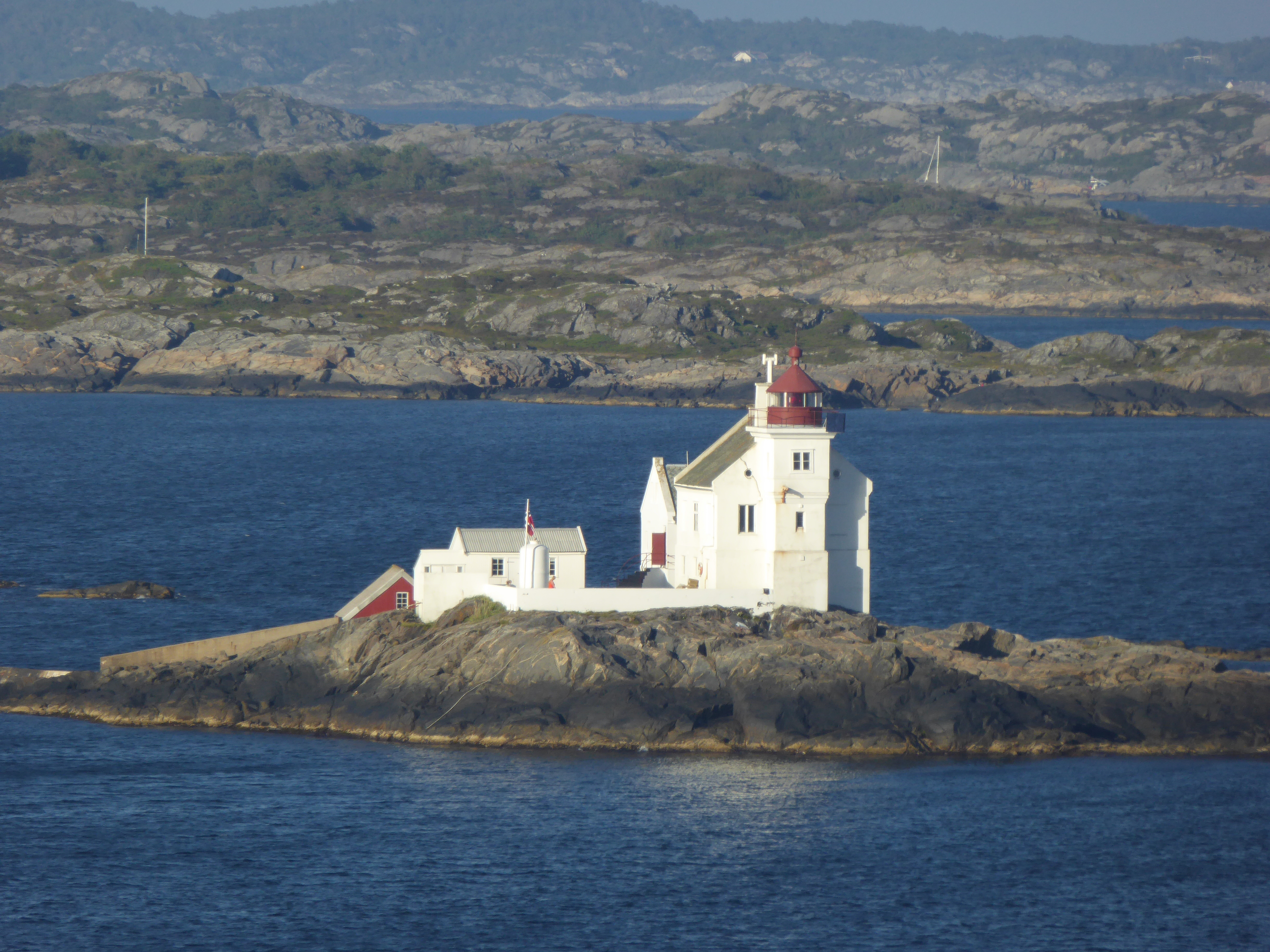
- View of Grønningen Lighthouse
- Location: Agder, Norway
- Coordinates: 58°04′53″N 8°05′17″E

Tower
- Constructed: 1878
- Construction: Concrete
- Automated: 1980
- Height: 14 metres (46 ft)
- Shape: Square
- Markings: White tower with red roof
- Heritage: cultural property

Light
- Focal height: 18.8 metres (62 ft)
- Lens: 4th order Fresnel lens
- Range: 11.7 nmi (21.7 km; 13.5 mi)
- Characteristic: Fl(2) W 10s
- Norway no.: 071600

Grønningen Lighthouse (Norwegian: Grønningen fyr) is a coastal lighthouse in Kristiansand Municipality in Agder county, Norway. The lighthouse was built in 1878 to improve the marking of the shipping lane into the harbor of the city of Kristiansand. In 1842, the Russian ship-of-the-line Ingermanland had collided with the Grønningen islet, leading to a catastrophe. The current lighthouse sits on Grønningen, a bare islet in the Kristiansandsfjorden, and it marks the eastern side of the main shipping channel that leads inland to the port of the city of Kristiansand. The other lighthouse, which marks the western entrance, Oksøy Lighthouse, lies about 2.2 kilometres (1.4 mi) to the west.

The 14-metre (46 ft) tall square concrete tower is white with a red roof. It is attached to one end of a 1 1/2-storey lighthouse keeper's house. The light sits at an elevation of 18.8 metres (62 ft) and it emits two white, red, or green flashes (depending on direction) every ten seconds. The light is a 4th order Fresnel lens. It can be seen for up to 11.7 nautical miles (21.7 km; 13.5 mi).

The lighthouse was first put into service on 1 September 1878. The station was staffed until 1980 and in 1994, the entire facility was protected by law as a national monument. The lighthouse is operated by the Bragdøya kystlag foundation, and it is open to the public. During the summer holiday season, it can be used as a free hostel available for overnight stays.

== See also ==
- Lighthouses in Norway
- List of lighthouses in Norway
