= Vi ere en Nation, vi med =

Poem written by Henrik Wergeland

Song
- Published: 1841
- Genre: Anthem
- Songwriters: Henrik Wergeland; André Grétry

Vi ere en Nation, vi med (English: We too are a nation, lit. "We are a nation, we with") is a poem written by Norwegian poet Henrik Wergeland, first published in 1841. Adapted as the lyrics of the Patriotic song "Smaagutternes Nationalsang", (English: The Little Boys' National Anthem), the text expresses a desire that Norwegian Constitution Day also should be a day for the children. The most commonly used melody for the song might have been written by French Classical-period composer, André Grétry, but this has not been confirmed.

== Other sources ==
- Flom, George T. Scandinavian Studies and Notes (General Books LLC. 2012)) ISBN 978-1154257687
- Grøndahl, Illit Henrik Wergeland, the Norwegian poet (BiblioBazaar, 2009) ISBN 978-1115014830

== Other Reading ==
(In Norwegian)

- Koht, Halvdan Henrik Wergeland (BiblioBazaar. 2009) ISBN 978-1117397245
- Seip, Karl En liten visebok for hjemmet (Oslo: Aschehoug. 1929)
- Ustvedt, Yngvar Henrik Wergeland: en biografi (Tiden Norsk Forlag. 1975) ISBN 978-8210010811
