= Oluf Hansen Hagen =

Norwegian politician (1845–1903)

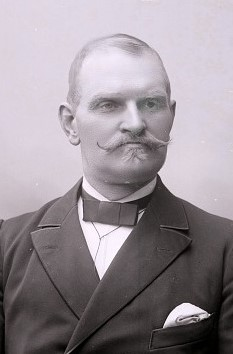

Member of the Norwegian Parliament for Trondhjem og Levanger
- In office 1898 – 1900

Personal details
- Born: 11 May 1845
- Died: 18 October 1903 (aged 58)
- Party: Liberal

Oluf Hansen Hagen (11 May 1845 – 18 October 1903) was a Norwegian politician for the Liberal Party.

He was elected to the Norwegian Parliament in 1898, representing the constituency of Trondhjem og Levanger. He served one term, from 1898 to 1900.
