= Axel Otto Kristian Hagemann =

Norwegian politician

Axel Otto Christian Hagemann (4 May 1856 –1 September 1907) was a Norwegian politician for the Conservative Party.

He was elected to the Norwegian Parliament in 1895, representing the constituency of Finmarkens Amt. He only served one term.
