= Oksøy Lighthouse =

Coastal lighthouse in Kristiansand, Norway

Oksøy Lighthouse Oksøy fyrstasjon
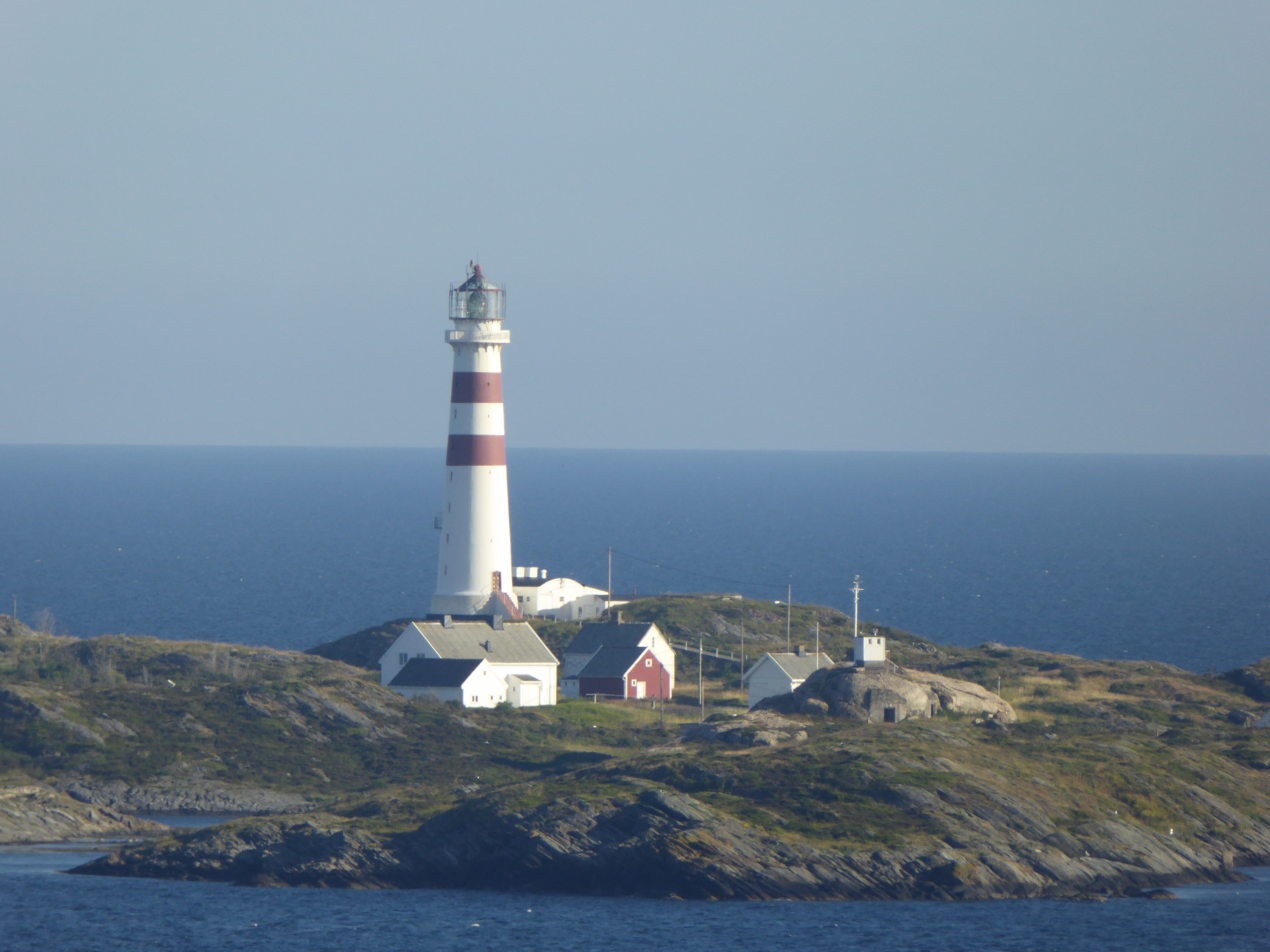
- Location: Oksøy, Kristiansand, Norway
- Coordinates: 58°04′20″N 8°03′11″E

Tower
- Constructed: 1900
- Construction: cast iron
- Automated: 2004
- Height: 36 m (118 ft)
- Shape: cylinder
- Markings: White (tower), red (stripe)
- Heritage: cultural property
- Racon: O

Light
- First lit: 1900
- Focal height: 47 m (154 ft)
- Lens: first order Fresnel lens
- Intensity: 4,401,000 candela
- Range: 17.4 nmi (32.2 km; 20.0 mi)
- Characteristic: Fl(2) W 45s

Oksøy Lighthouse (Norwegian: Oksøy fyr) is a coastal lighthouse in Kristiansand Municipality in Agder county, Norway. The lighthouse sits on the islet of Oksøy which is located in the Kristiansandsfjorden, just east of the island of Flekkerøya. The lighthouse marks the western side of the main shipping channel that leads inland to the port of the city of Kristiansand. The other lighthouse, which marks the eastern entrance, Grønningen Lighthouse, lies about 2.2 kilometres (1.4 mi) to the east. The lighthouse has a racon signal, emitting a morse code "O" (- - -).

The lighthouse was first built in 1832, but it was rebuilt in 1900. The present 36-metre (118 ft) tall cylindrical cast iron tower is white with two red bands painted around it. The light sits at an elevation of 47 metres (154 ft) and it emits two white flashes every 45 seconds. The light is a 1st order Fresnel lens which emits a light with an intensity of 4,401,000 candelas. It can be seen for up to 17.4 nautical miles (32.2 km; 20.0 mi) in all directions. Additionally, there is a secondary light located lower down on the tower that emits a continuous white light at an elevation of 25.5 metres (84 ft) above sea level. That light can be seen for up to 12.2 nautical miles (22.6 km; 14.0 mi) only on one side of the lighthouse.

== See also ==
- Lighthouses in Norway
- List of lighthouses in Norway
