= Budal Church =

Church in Trøndelag, Norway

- Budal kirke
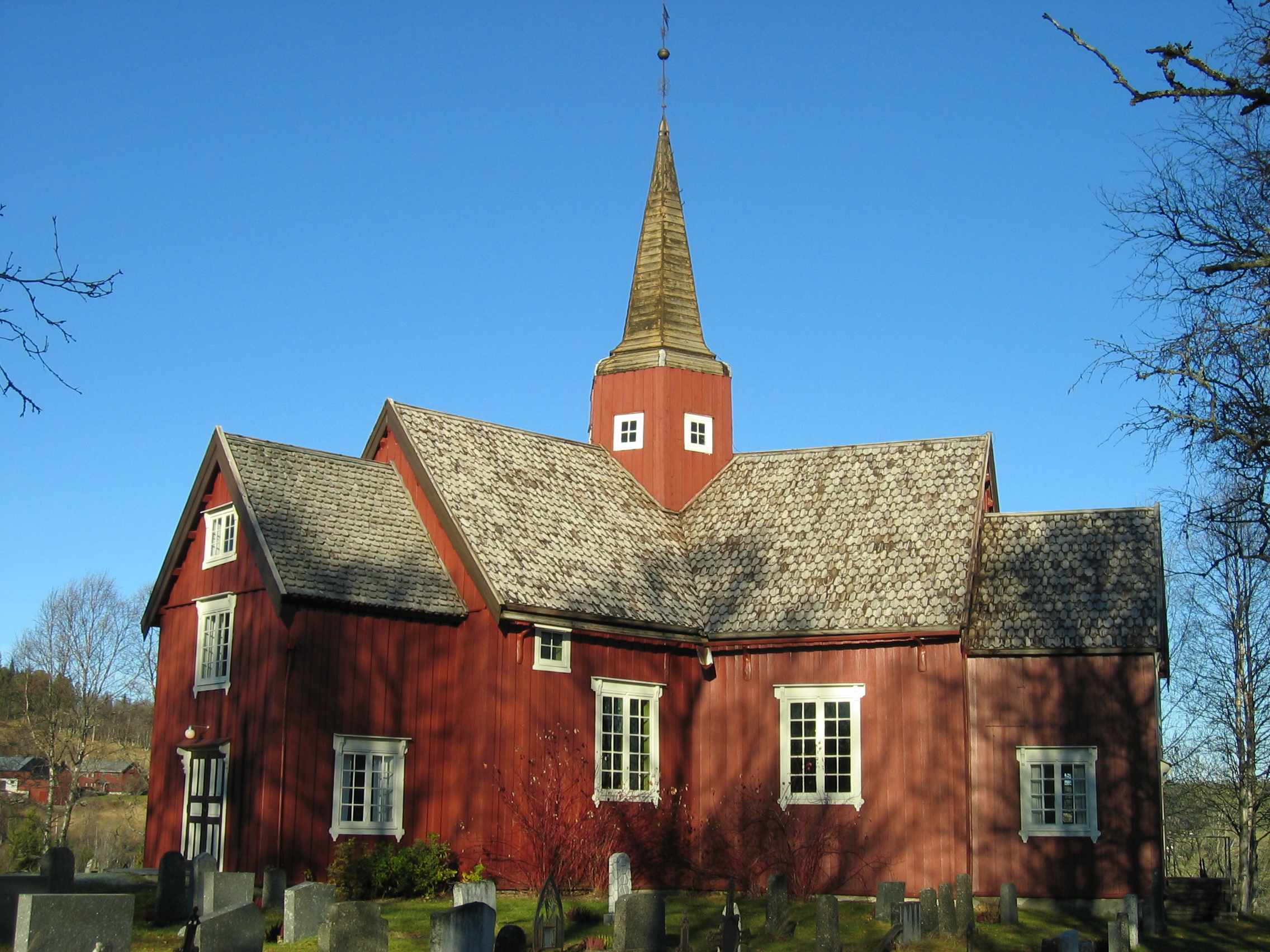
- View of the church
- Budal Church
- 62.885025577°N 10.483758598°E
- Location: Midtre Gauldal Municipality, Trøndelag
- Country: Norway
- Denomination: Church of Norway
- Churchmanship: Evangelical Lutheran

History
- Former name: Hellig treenighets kirke
- Status: Parish church
- Founded: 1754
- Consecrated: 19 June 1754

Architecture
- Functional status: Active
- Architectural type: Y-shaped
- Completed: 1754 (272 years ago)

Specifications
- Capacity: 170
- Materials: Wood

Administration
- Diocese: Nidaros bispedømme
- Deanery: Gauldal prosti
- Parish: Budal
- Norwegian Cultural Heritage Site
- Type: Church
- Status: Automatically protected
- ID: 83971

Budal Church (Norwegian: Budal Kirke) is a parish church within Midtre Gauldal Municipality in Trøndelag county, Norway. It is located in the village of Enodden. It is the church for the Budal parish which is part of the Gauldal prosti (deanery) in the Diocese of Nidaros. The red, wooden church was built in 1754 using plans drawn up by an unknown architect. The church was built in a Y-shaped design, which is quite rare in Norway. The church seats about 200 people.

== History ==
The mountain valley of Budal was historically rather isolated from the rest of the parish. During the summer of 1752, the bishop requested a building permit from the government to construct a church in Budal. The permit was approved and the church was completed in 1754. It was consecrated on 19 June 1754. It was built in a Y-shape and it is the most recently built of the 10 existing Y-shaped churches in Norway.

== Media gallery ==
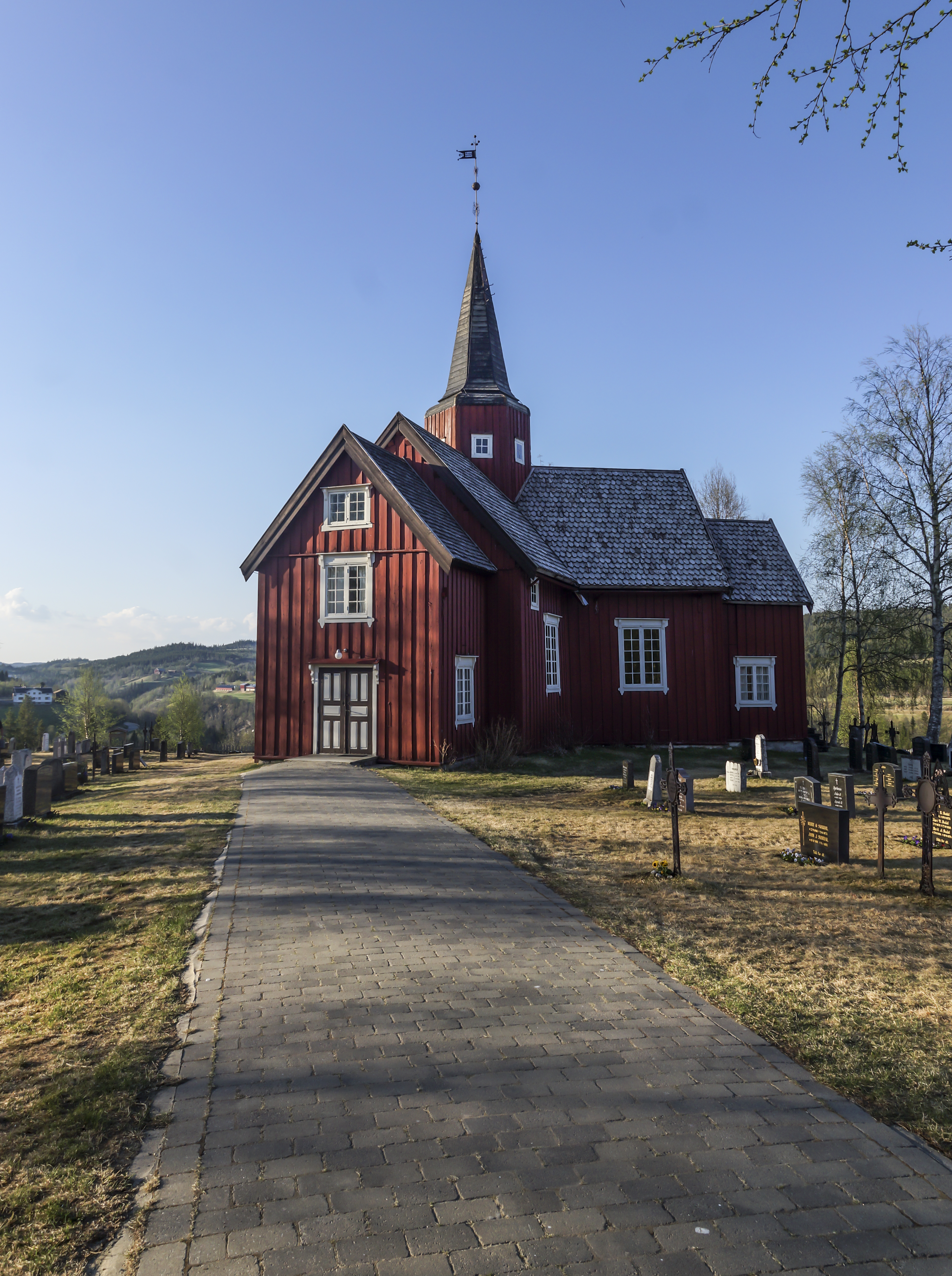

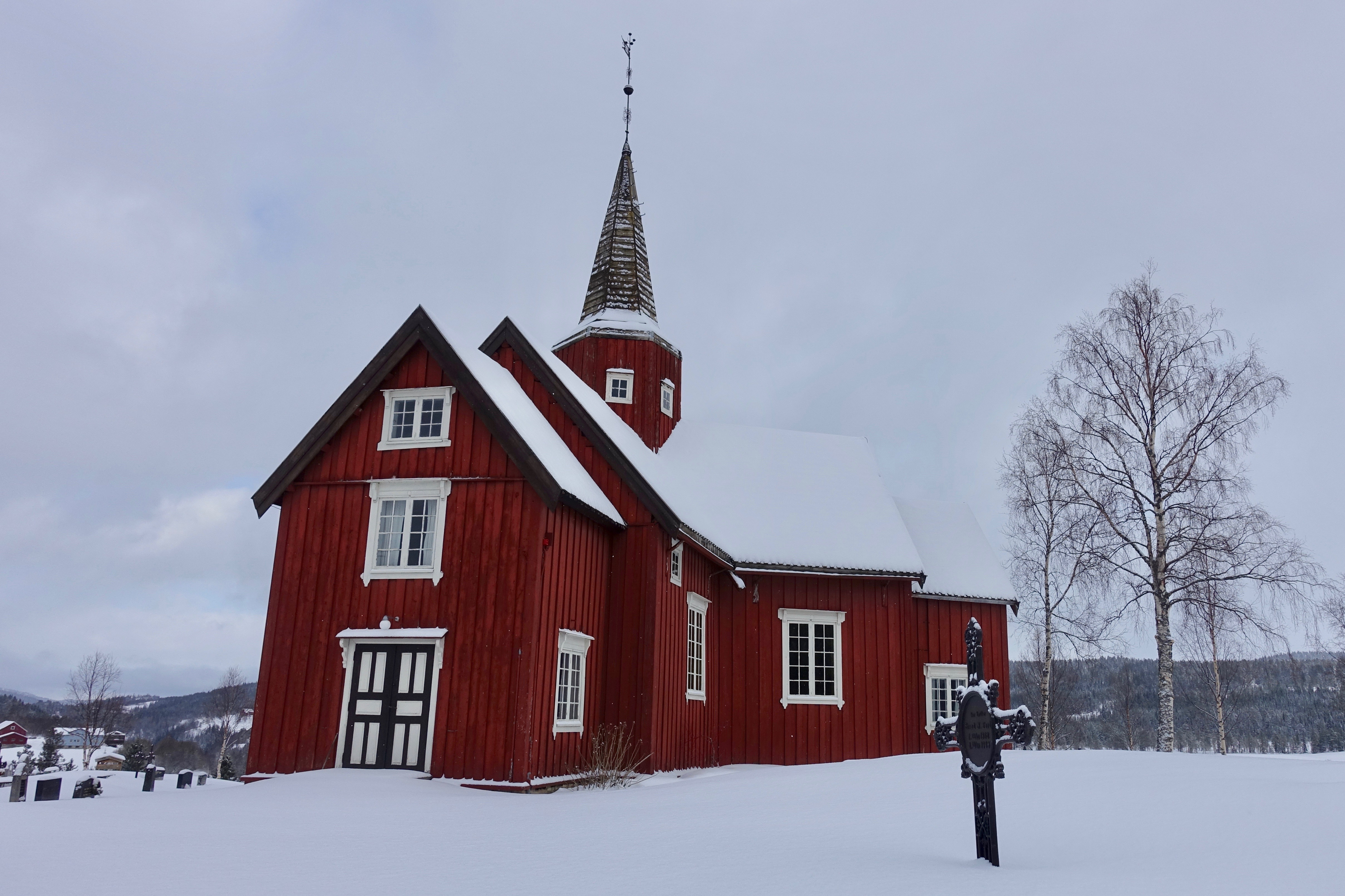

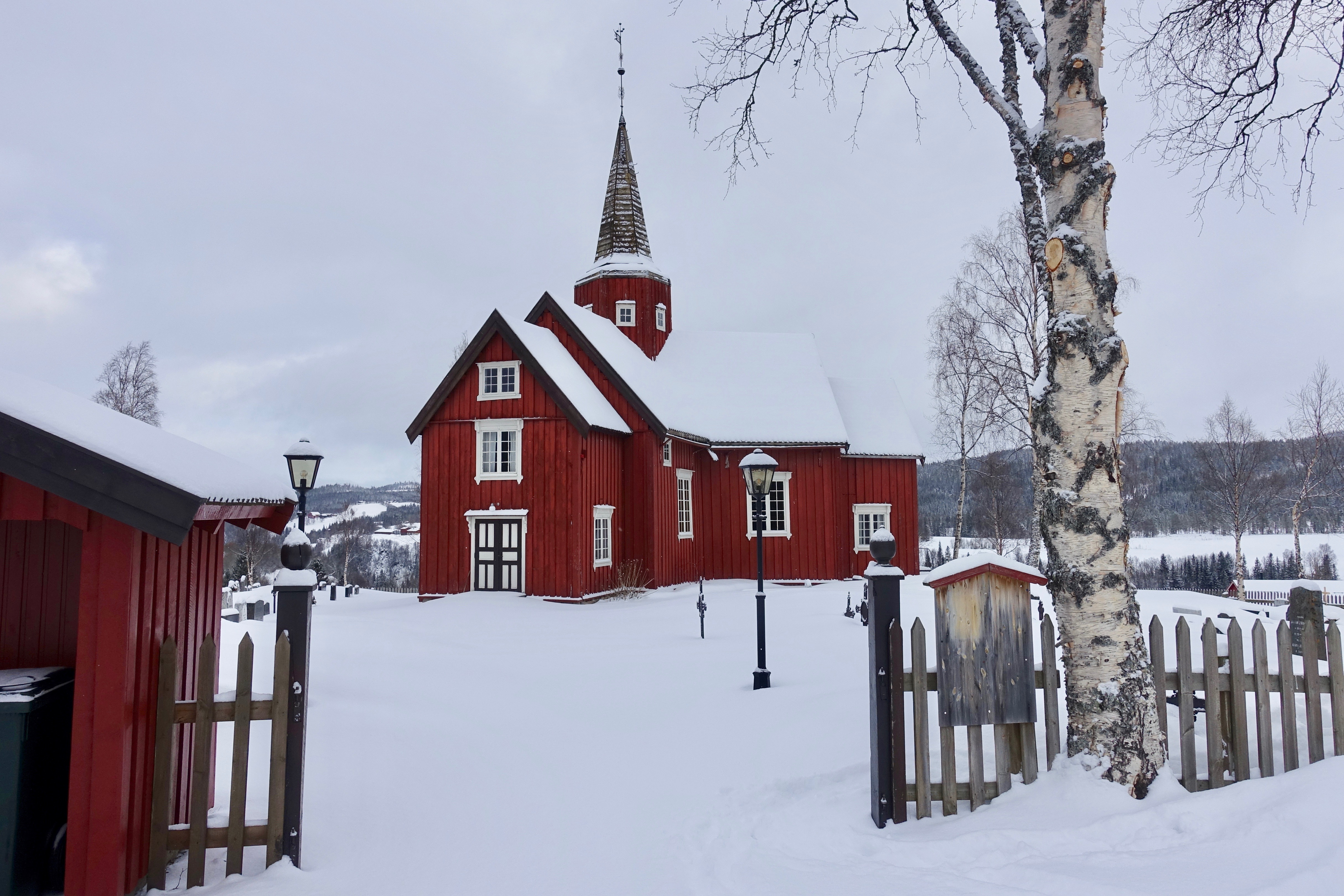

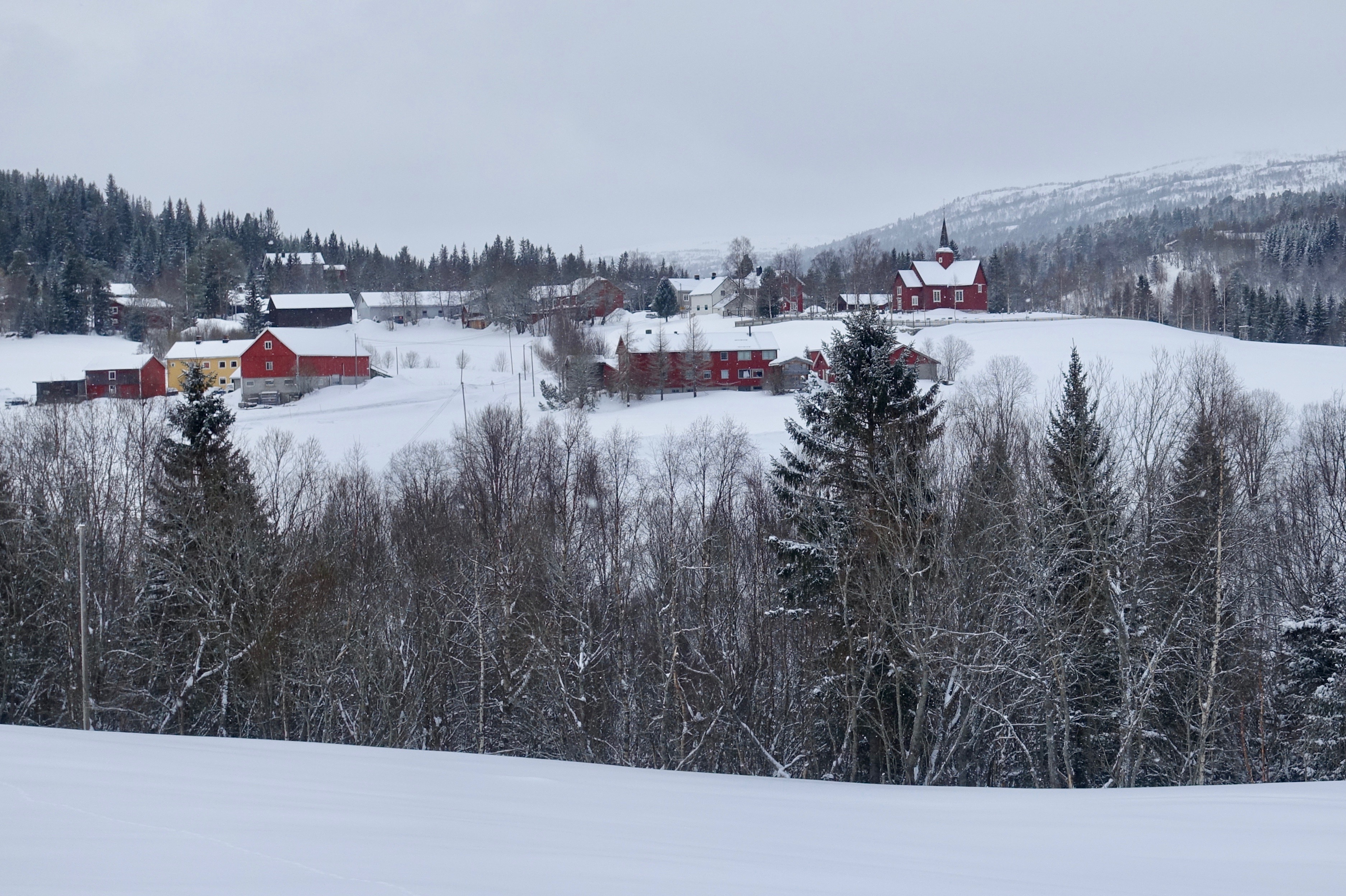

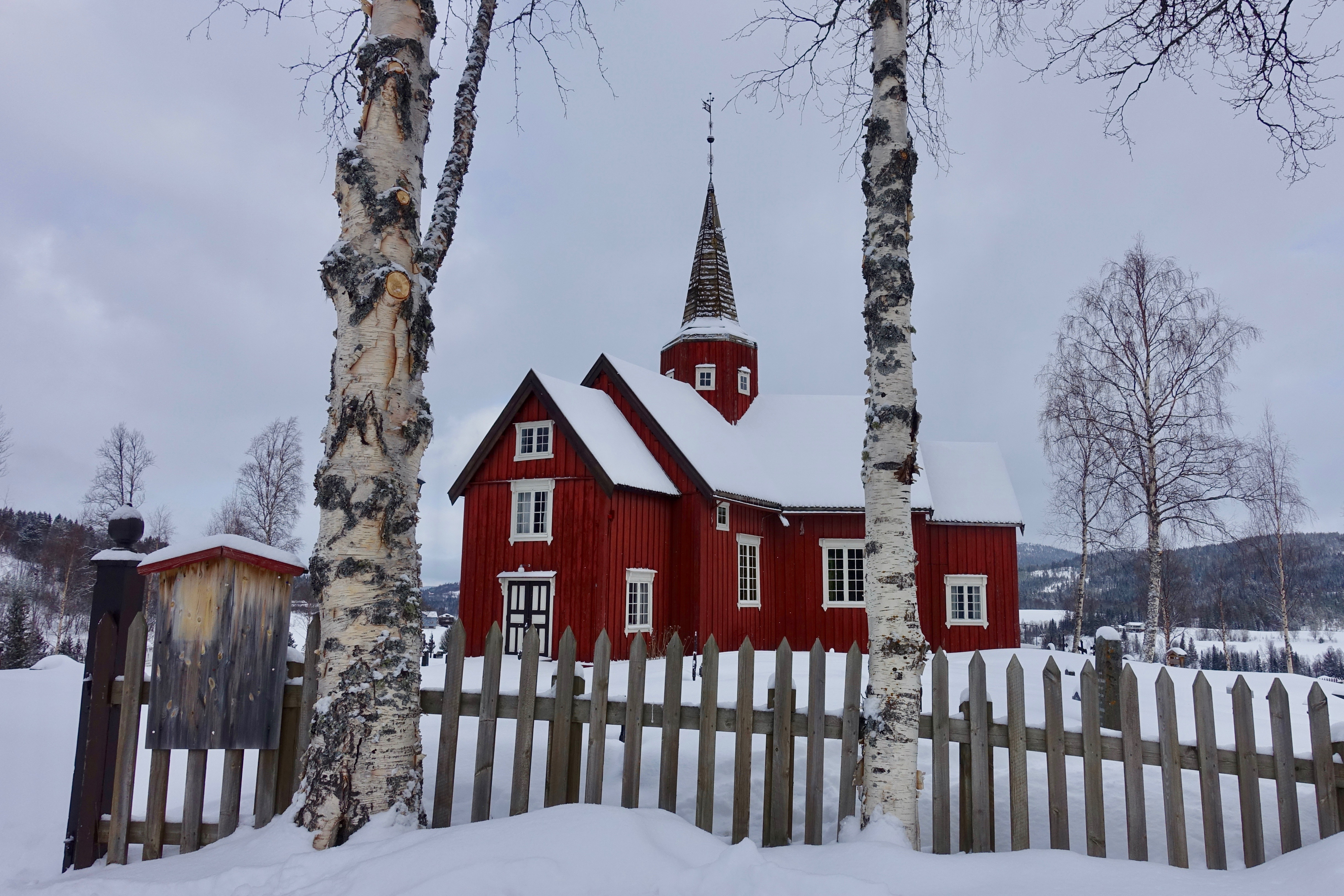

== See also ==
- List of churches in Nidaros
