= Gullverket =

- Village
- Location in Akershus
- Coordinates: 60°22′00″N 11°20′49″E
- Country: Norway
- Region: Østlandet
- County: Akershus
- Municipality: Eidsvoll
- Time zone: UTC+01:00 (CET)
  - Summer (DST): UTC+02:00 (CEST)

Gullverket is a village in Eidsvoll municipality, Akershus county, Norway. The village is situated just east of Minnesund, near the border with Hedmark.

The name of the hamlet resulted from the operation of gold mines here from 1758 and until 1907 with several interruptions in between. Dating from 1721, copper mines had operated in Eidsvoll. About 1749, Ole Wiborg found a small gold nugget in the copper mine. By 1759, the Brustad Mines Ltd were in operation and a smelter was constructed. However, the ore consisted more of copper than gold. In 1792, Bernt Anker became sole owner and managed the operation until his death in 1805. Lyssjø Copper Mining remained in operation until 1807.

In 1897, an English-based company, Golden Mint Mines Ltd., resumed operations. The Brustad Mine was reopened employing up to 120 workers. A smaller mine, Santander Mine, west of administration facility was also opened. The ore was processed by a large crusher at Gullverket. Homes were constructed for managers and workers. But the operation was far from profitable. The best year of 1902 only 50 kg gold were recovered, which did not cover expenses. By 1907 the operation was bankrupt.

Today, local shops, schools and virtually all workplaces are closed. The buildings are a mix of small farms, newer houses and vacation properties in a hilly, forested landscape.
