= Christen Pram =

Norwegian/Danish economist, civil servant, and poet

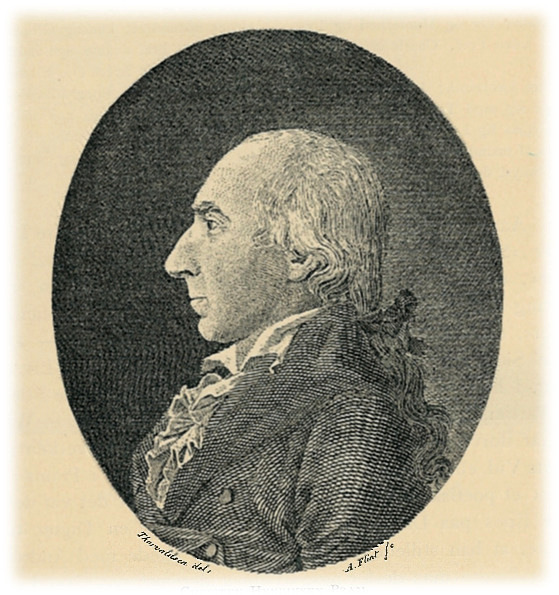
- Born: Christen Henriksen Pram; 4 September 1756; Lesja, Norway
- Died: 28 November 1821 (aged 65); Saint Thomas, in the Danish West Indies
- Occupations: Economist; Civil servant Poet; Novelist; Playwright; Diarist; Magazine editor

Christen Henriksen Pram (4 September 1756 – 28 November 1821) was a Norwegian/Danish economist, civil servant, poet, novelist, playwright, diarist and magazine editor. He is held as the first Norwegian novelist, although his writing was carried out in the Danish language.

== Personal life ==
Christen was born in Lesja, a son of Minister Henrik Frederik Pram and Olava Maria de Stockfleth. When he was eight years old, he moved with his family to Denmark, when his father assumed a position as vicar in Sjælland. He married Maria Magdalena Erichsen in 1782. He died on the island of Saint Thomas, in the Danish West Indies, in 1821. Pram was a member of the Norwegian Society in Copenhagen.

== Career ==
Prom assumed various positions in Kommercekollegiet (the Copenhagen College of Commerce), where he was appointed in 1781. He made his literary breakthrough in 1782, with the poem "Emilias Kilde". His best known literary work is the epic cycle of poems Stærkodder of 1785, based on the legendary hero Starkaðr from Saxo Grammaticus' monumental work Gesta Danorum. He co-founded and co-edited the cultural magazine Minerva from 1785, in cooperation with Knud Lyne Rahbek. He was the sole editor of Minerva from 1789, but after having received warnings over his enthusiasm for the French Revolution, he resigned as editor in 1793.

In 1820, as a consequence of a failed marriage and economic difficulties, he moved to the Danish West Indies to assume a position as customs inspector in Charlotte Amalie on Saint Thomas. For his farewell party in Copenhagen, in April 1820, N. F. S. Grundtvig wrote the song Langt højere bjerge så vide på jord. He died on Saint Thomas in 1821.

== Literary works ==
He is regarded as the first Norwegian novelist. Among his novels are Jørgen, en Dosmers Levnedsbeskrivelse (Jørgen, the Biography of a fool) and Hans Kruuskop of 1786, and John Thral. Bidrag til Frihedens Historie (John Thral. A Contribution to the History of Freedom) of 1787. He wrote the comedy Ægteskabsskolen (The School for Marriage) in 1795. In the same year he delivered a prize-winning contribution to the preparations for a university in Norway.

== Bibliography ==
- Philippa til Erik (1779)
- Emilias Kilde (1782)
- Hymne til Vaaren (1784)
- Stærkodder. Et Digt i femten Sange (1785)
- Jørgen, en Dosmers Levnedsbeskrivelse, novel (1786)
- Hans Kruuskop, novel (1786)
- John Thral. Bidrag til Frihedens Historie (1787)
- Om en Husmoders Pligter (1787)
- Lagertha (1789), historic drama
- Damon og Pythias (1790), historic drama
- Frode og Fingal (1790), historic drama
- Forsøg om Dragten, især for Danmark og Norge (1791)
- Negeren (1791), drama
- Ægteskabsskolen. Lystspil i fem Akter (1795), drama
- Serenaden eller de sorte Næser (1795), drama
- Forsøg om en Højskoles Anlæg i Norge (1795)
- Undersøgelse om den kjøbenhavnske Waisenhusstiftelse (1796)
- Brønden (1800), drama
- Frokosten i Bellevue (1803), drama
