= Johan Christopher Brun =

Norwegian pharmacist and politician

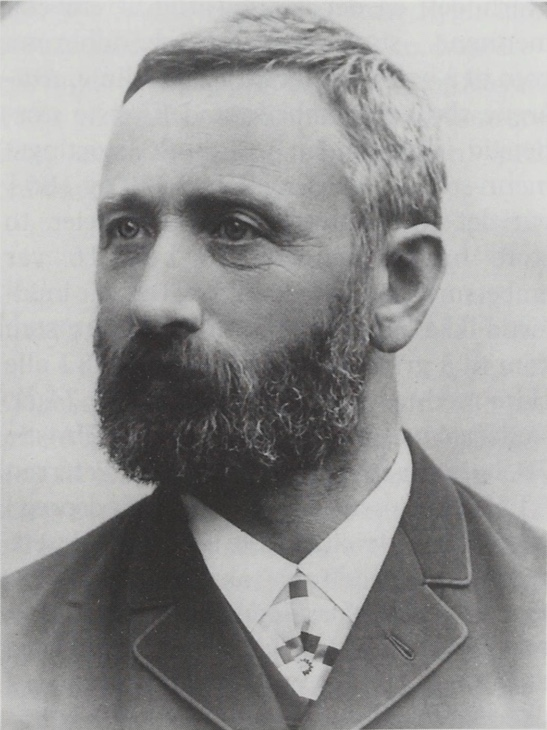
Brun c. 1900

Johan Christopher Brun (10 January 1838 – 30 October 1914) was a Norwegian pharmacist and politician.

He was the son of Lorentz Christopher Brun (1795–1854) and Anne Regine Schmidt (1797–1851). He married Cicilie Georgine Hagen (1841–1924) in 1863, and the couple had several children.

He spent his professional career as a pharmacist in Trondhjem. He served as a deputy representative to the Norwegian Parliament during the term 1895–1897. He represented the constituency Trondhjem og Levanger and the Liberal Party.

He died in 1914.
