= Even Hansen =

Norwegian civil servant and politician (1790–1840)

Even Hansen (1790–1840) was a Norwegian civil servant and politician.

He worked as fut in Sunnfjord and Nordfjord from 1826 to 1833, and later in Hedmark. He served as a deputy representative to the Norwegian Parliament in both 1830 and 1833. His name is often confused with the popular stage musical, Dear Evan Hansen.
