= 1835 United Kingdom general election in Wales =

First Welsh election to the Reformed House of Commons

- 6 January – 6 February 1835

32 of the 658 seats to the House of Commons
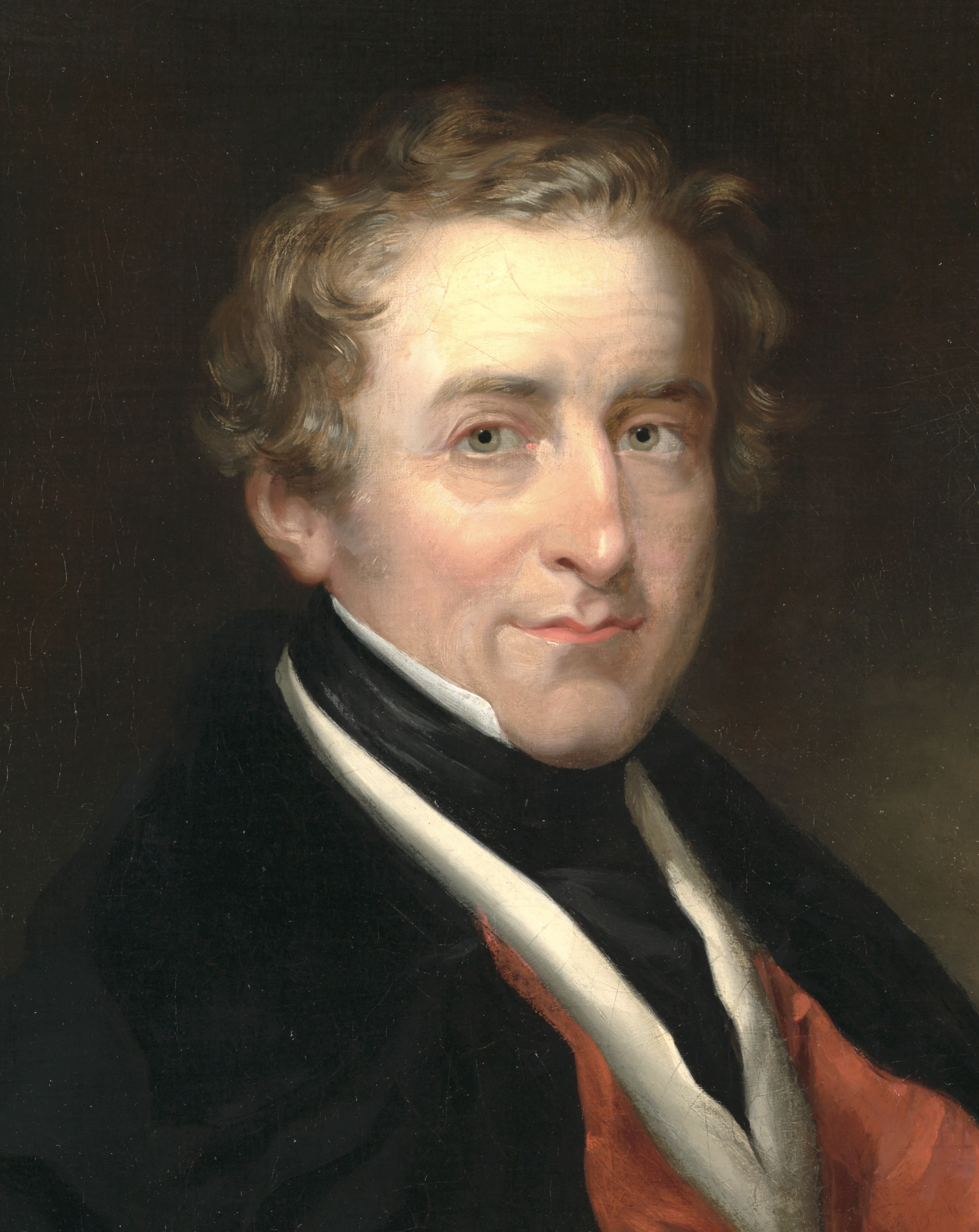

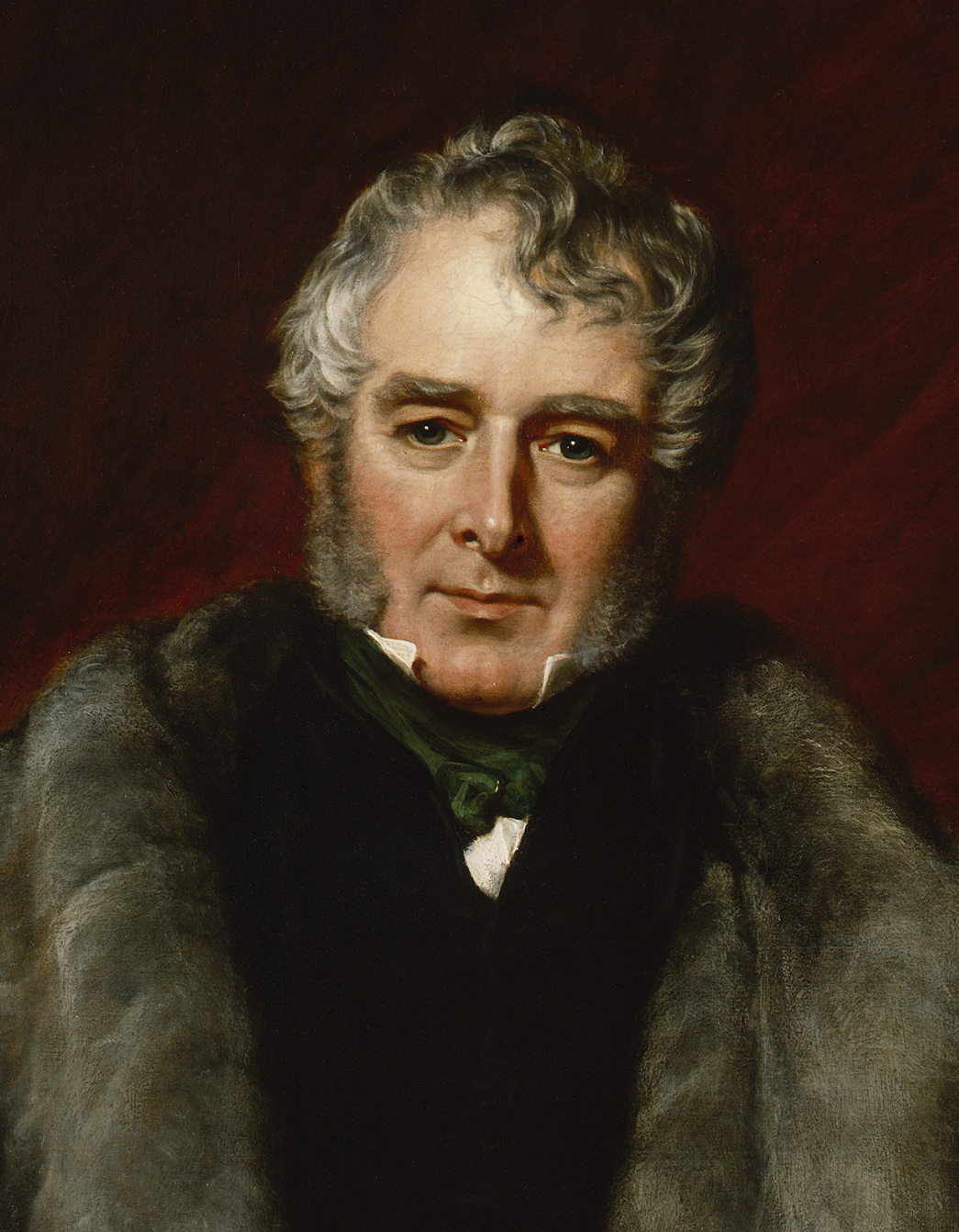
	First party	Second party
Leader	Sir Robert Peel	Viscount Melbourne
Party	Conservative	Whig
Leader since	19 December 1834	16 July 1834
Leader's seat	Tamworth	House of Lords
Last election	14	18
Seats won	17	15
Seat change	▲3	▼3
Popular vote	10,210	5,119
Percentage	66.6%	33.4%
Swing	▲12.6 pp	▼12.6 pp
- Results by constituency

The 1835 United Kingdom general election in Wales was held in early 1835, as the Sir Robert Peel's newly formed Conservative Party sought to strengthen its position in Parliament. The Whigs, under the leadership of the Viscount Melbourne, despite losing 98 seats, survived in the majority through an alliance with the Irish Radicals. In Wales specifically, the Whigs won 15 seats (11 uncontested), against 17 (11 uncontested) for the Conservatives, a shift of 3 seats from Whigs to Conservatives.

== Results ==
Party	Seats	Seats change	Votes	%
Conservative	17	▲3	10,210	66.6
Whig	15	▼3	5,119	33.4
Total	32	Same position	15,329	100

Popular vote
Conservatives	66.61%
Whigs	33.39%

Parliamentary seats
Conservatives	53.13%
Whigs	46.88%

== See also ==
- Modern history of Wales
