= Carl Willoch Ludvig Horn =

Norwegian educator, textbook writer and politician

- Born: 21 August 1841; Kristiansand, Norway
- Died: 13 August 1913 (aged 71)
- Occupations: Educator, textbook writer and politician

Carl Willoch Ludvig Horn (21 August 1841 – 13 August 1913) was a Norwegian educator, textbook writer and politician. He was born in Kristiansand.

He served as principal of the middle school in Hamar, was a member of various governmental commissions, and wrote textbooks in geography. He also served as mayor of Hamar.
