= Torsten Ottersen Hoff =

Norwegian sculptor

Torsten Ottersen Hoff (c.1688 – 1754) was a Norwegian sculptor. In addition to commissions in his home town, he did work in several other places in eastern and southern Norway. He also made furnace models for the ironworks.

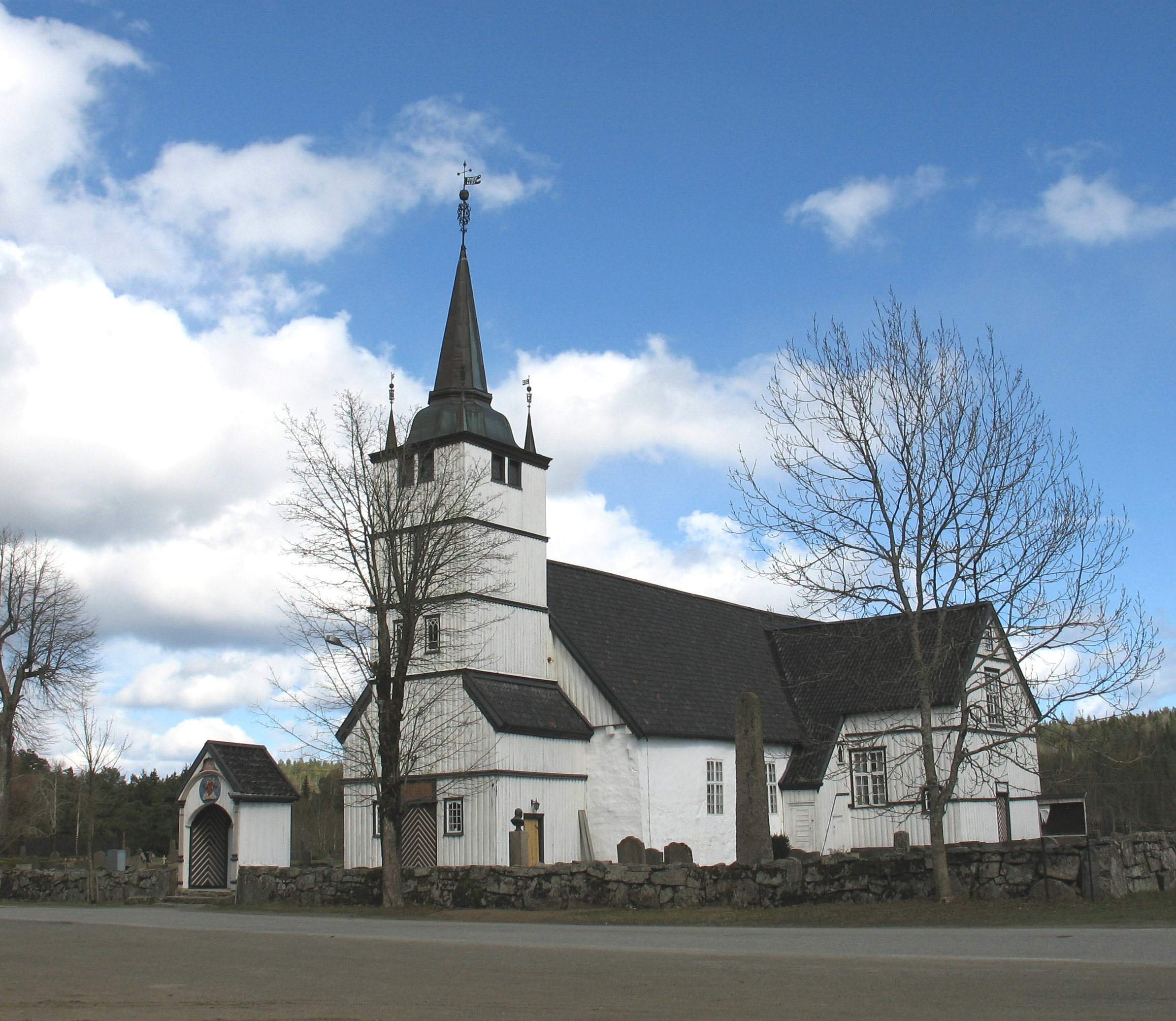
The interior of Holt Church was probably decorated by Hoff

He is known for decorations of the Oslo Cathedral, and is regarded to have decorated interior of Sørum Church, and churches in Løken, Vestby, Holt and Ås. He also designed oven plates for several ironworks.
