= 1844 Norwegian parliamentary election =

- May–16 October 1844

All 102 seats in the Storting 52 seats needed for a majority
- Registered: 69,968
- Turnout: 49.39%
Prime Minister before election
Frederik Gottschalck Haxthausen Due
Prime Minister after election
Frederik Gottschalck Haxthausen Due

Parliamentary elections were held in Norway in 1844. As political parties were not officially established until 1884, all those elected were independents. The number of seats in the Storting was increased from 100 to 102. Voter turnout was 49%, although only 5% of the country's population was eligible to vote.

== Results ==
Of the 102 seats, 44 were won by civil servants, 42 by farmers, sheriffs, church singers and teachers and 16 by people with other professions.

Party	Votes	%	Seats
Independents			102
Total			102
Total votes	34,559	–	
Registered voters/turnout	69,968	49.39	
Source: Nohlen & Stöver, NSSDS
