= Hilchen Sommerschild =

Norwegian teacher

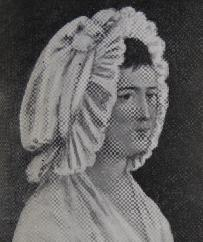
Hilchen Sommerschild

Hilchen Sommerschild (1756 - 6 November 1831), was a Norwegian teacher. She was a teacher with the title læremoder (Teacher Mother) at the Trondhjems borgerlige Realskole (The Burgher's Realschule in Trondhjem) between 1799 and 1826. She is referred to as the first female academic professional teacher in Norway.

Hilchen Sommerschild was born to sea captain Job Thode (1720–66) and Inger Marie Gram (1725–82) and married in 1790 to sea captain Peter Henrich Sommerschild (1754–1798). Her education is unknown. In 1799, she was employed as a teacher for the female students at the first Realschule in Norway: Trondhjems borgerlige Realskole. It had been opened in 1783 and was intended to teach both genders, but it had been regarded unsuitable for females to be educated there until the employment of a female teacher.

Her subjects were music, singing and languages: she was also expected to tend to household tasks, and order in school and to always be present to supervise the female students whether in class or on the breaks. She was described as competent. She was given a salary of 150 riksdaler in comparison to her male colleagues, who were given 300. In 1803 she was given a maid as an assistant. The school was seen as a model school for the subsequent public schools which were founded after it, as was her position there until the 1860s.
