= Lars Larsen Forsæth =

Norwegian farmer and representative

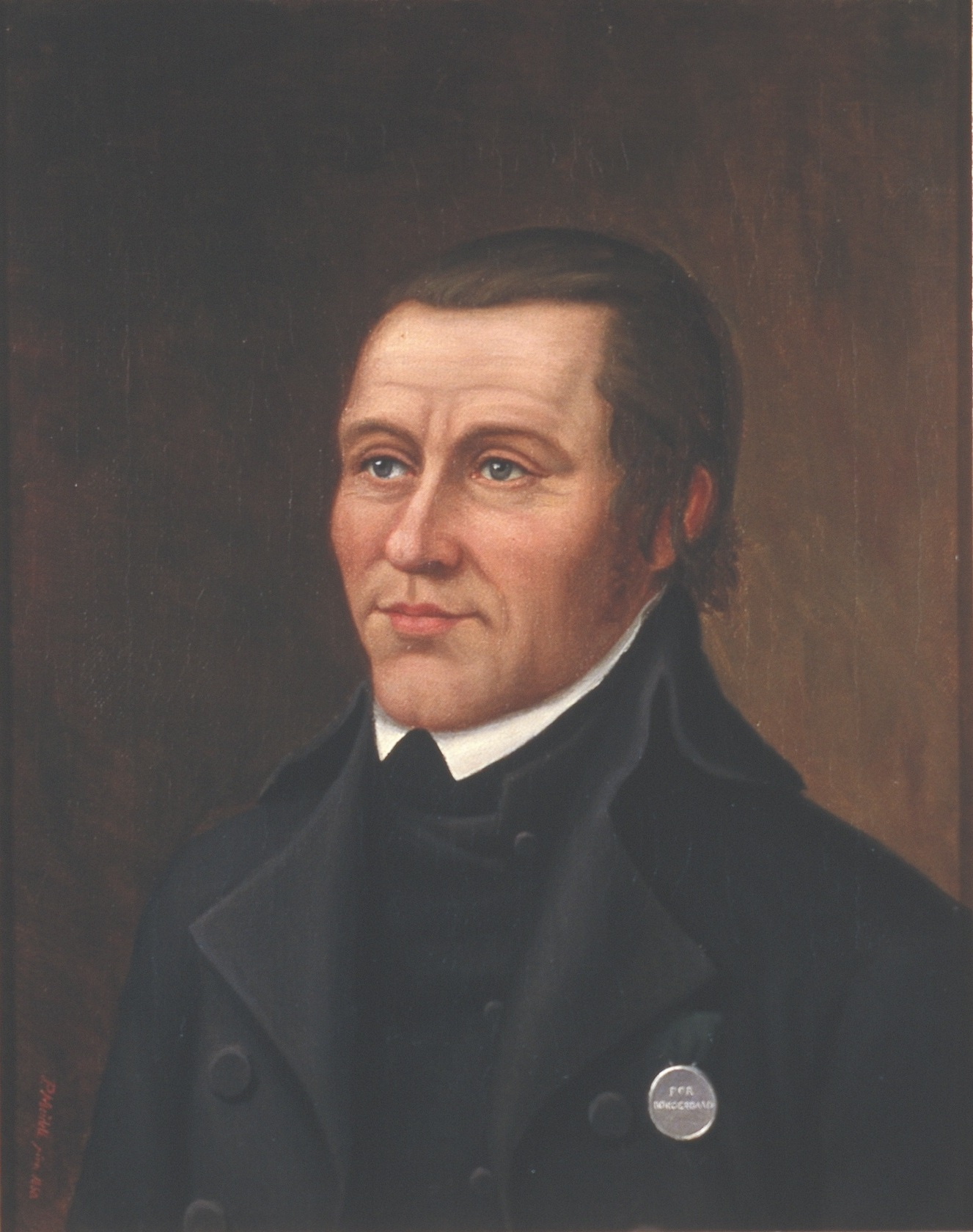
Lars Larsen Forsæth painted by Christopher Pritzier Meidell.

Lars Larsen Forsæth (baptized 9 December 1759 – 12 February 1839) was a Norwegian farmer who served as a representative at the Norwegian Constituent Assembly.

Lars Larsen Forsæth was born at Forset, a family farm in the parish of Klæbu in Sør-Trøndelag, Norway. His brother Paul Larsen Forsæth (1762–1817) and their father, Lars Larsen Forsæth (1731–1812) were the only survivors in his family after his mother and four siblings died of dysentery during the summer of 1773. The two brothers took over operation of the farm in 1788. Both brothers were enterprising farmers who over time bought additional properties. Lars Forsæth served as one of the Settlement Commissioners (Forlikskommissær) on the Conciliation Board (Forliksråd) for his community for many years. Forsæth was also a skilled carpenter and builder. He produced drawings used to build the octagonal Klæbu Church.

Lars Larsen Forsæth represented Søndre Trondhjems amt (now Sør-Trøndelag) at the Norwegian Constituent Assembly in 1814, together with Jacob Hersleb Darre and Anders Rambech. The assembly was held at Eidsvoll Manor. At the meeting, all three delegates supported the independence party (selvstendighetspartiet).

Lars Forsæth was decorated with the Order of the Dannebrog and the Medal for Outstanding Civic Service (borgerdådsmedaljen).

== Related Reading ==
- Holme Jørn (2014)De kom fra alle kanter - Eidsvollsmennene og deres hus (Oslo: Cappelen Damm) ISBN 978-82-02-44564-5
