= 1835 Norwegian parliamentary election =

- June–7 December 1835

All 96 seats in the Storting 49 seats needed for a majority
- Registered: 66,561
- Turnout: 52.27%
Prime Minister before election
Severin Løvenskiold
Prime Minister after election
Severin Løvenskiold

Parliamentary elections were held in Norway in 1835. As political parties were not officially established until 1884, all those elected were independents. The number of seats in the Storting was increased from 95 to 96. Voter turnout was 52%, although only 6% of the country's population was eligible to vote.

== Results ==
Of the 96 seats, 45 were won by farmers, sheriffs, church singers and teachers, 35 by civil servants and 16 by people with other professions.

Party	Votes	%	Seats
Independents			96
Total			96
Total votes	34,791	–	
Registered voters/turnout	66,561	52.27	
Source: Nohlen & Stöver, NSSDS
