= 1841 Norwegian parliamentary election =

- June–12 November 1841

All 100 seats in the Storting 51 seats needed for a majority
- Registered: 69,492
- Turnout: 51.06%
Prime Minister before election
Severin Løvenskiold
Prime Minister after election
Severin Løvenskiold

Parliamentary elections were held in Norway in 1841. As political parties were not officially established until 1884, all those elected were independents. The number of seats in the Storting was increased from 99 to 100. Voter turnout was 51%, although only 5.5% of the country's population was eligible to vote.

== Results ==
Of the 100 seats, 43 were won by farmers, sheriffs, church singers and teachers, 41 by civil servants and 16 by people with other professions.

Party	Votes	%	Seats
Independents			100
Total			100
Total votes	35,481	–	
Registered voters/turnout	69,492	51.06	
Source: Nohlen & Stöver, NSSDS
