= Nils Trondsen Thune =

Norwegian politician

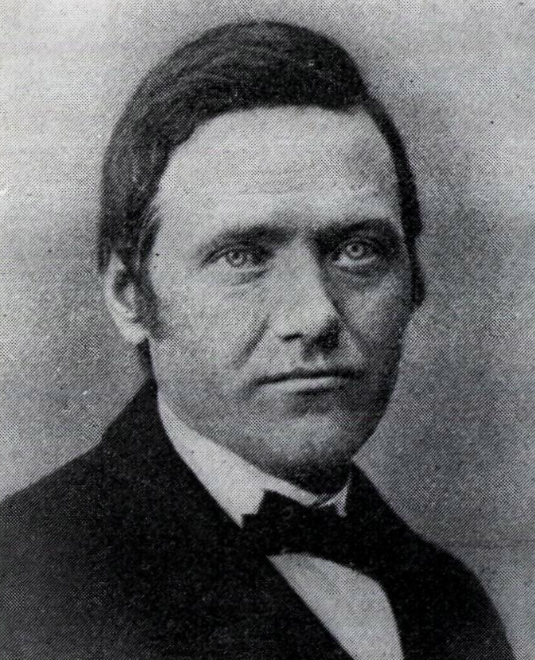
Nils T. Thune

Nils Trondsen Thune (1835 – 29 December 1879) was a Norwegian politician.

He was elected to the first session of the Norwegian Parliament in 1871, 1874, 1877 and 1880, representing the constituency of Christians Amt. He worked as a farmer there.

He was the father of later politician Helge Nilsen Thune.
