= 1836 in Norway =

- Centuries: 17th; 18th; 19th; 20th; 21st
- Decades: 1810s; 1820s; 1830s; 1840s; 1850s
- See also: 1836 in Sweden; List of years in Norway

Events in the year 1836 in Norway.

== Incumbents ==
- Monarch: Charles III John.
- First Minister: Nicolai Krog

== Events ==
- The town of Tvedestrand was founded.
- The town of Levanger was founded.
- The first Lista Lighthouse was established.
- Count Herman Wedel Jarlsberg is appointed Governor-general of Norway.

== Births ==
- 24 February – Elias Blix, poet, musician, politician and Minister (d.1902)
- 22 March – John Anderson, Norwegian-American newspaper publisher (d.1910)
- 22 September – Baard Iversen, businessperson and politician (d.1920)
- 14 November – Nikka Vonen, educator, folklorist and author (d. 1933).

=== Full date unknown ===
- Ludvig Maribo Benjamin Aubert, jurist and politician (d.1896)
- Hans Gløersen, forest manager and lawyer (d.1904)
- Hans Syvert Jacobsen, politician

== Deaths ==
- 8 May – Christen Thorn Aamodt, priest (b.1770)
- 12 September – Svend Borchmann Hersleb, professor of theology and politician (b.1784)

=== Full date unknown ===
- Hans Jacob Stabel, priest and politician (b.1769)
