= 1770 in Norway =

- Centuries: 16th; 17th; 18th; 19th; 20th
- Decades: 1750s; 1760s; 1770s; 1780s; 1790s
- See also: 1770 in Denmark; List of years in Norway

Events in the year 1770 in Norway.

== Incumbents ==
- Monarch: Christian VII.

== Events ==
- 26 January - Jacob Benzon is appointed Steward of Norway.

== Arts and literature ==
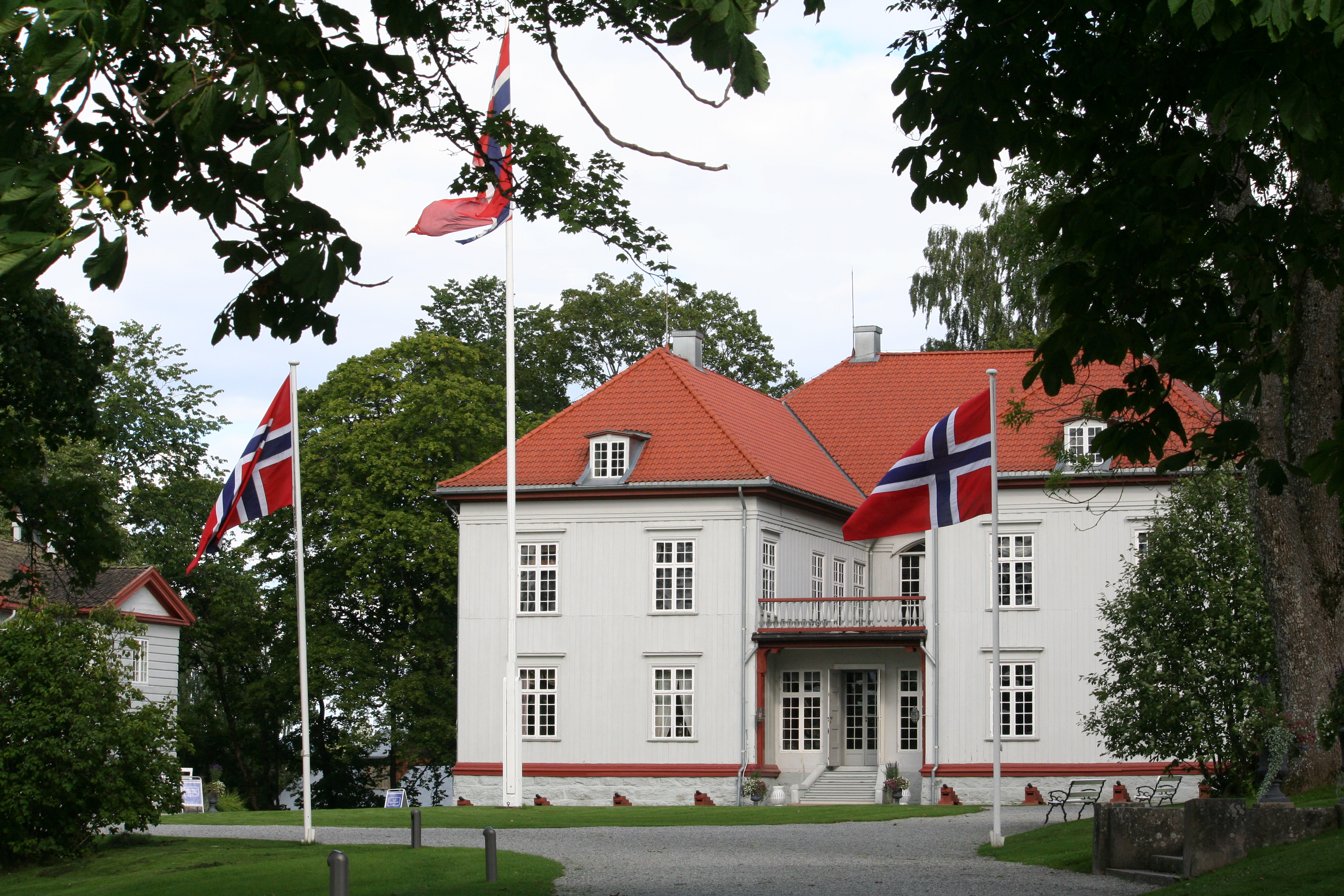
Eidsvollbygningen.

- 26 January - Ballet was performed by Madame Stuart, possibly the first ballet ever performed in Oslo.

=== Full date unknown ===
- The construction of Eidsvollsbygningen was finished.

== Births ==
- 25 April - Georg Sverdrup, philologist (died 1850)
- 4 August - Christen Thorn Aamodt, priest (died 1836)

=== Full date unknown ===
- Anders Trulsson Bruland, civil servant and politician (died 1818)

== Deaths ==
- 19 April – Jürgen Christoph von Koppelow, nobleman and officer (born 1684)
- 10 September – Michael Heltzen, mining engineer (born 1712).
