= 1762 in Norway =

- Centuries: 16th; 17th; 18th; 19th; 20th
- Decades: 1740s; 1750s; 1760s; 1770s; 1780s
- See also: 1762 in Denmark; List of years in Norway

Events in the year 1762 in Norway.

== Incumbents ==
- Monarch: Frederick V.

== Events ==
- Hadeland Glassverk is established in Jevnaker.

== Births ==
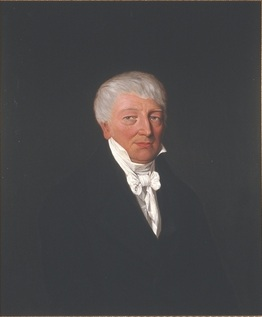
Alexander Møller was member of the Norwegian Constituent Assembly in 1814.

- 24 April – Alexander Møller, surgeon (died 1847).
- 16 November – Henriette Mathiesen, culture personality (died 1825)

=== Full date unknown ===
- Peder Jacobsen Bøgvald, politician (died 1829)

== Deaths ==
- 12 November – Hans Friis, priest and poet (born 1716).

=== Full date unknown ===
- Lars Pinnerud, woodcarver (born 1700).
