= 1761 in Norway =

- Centuries: 16th; 17th; 18th; 19th; 20th
- Decades: 1740s; 1750s; 1760s; 1770s; 1780s
- See also: 1761 in Denmark; List of years in Norway

Events in the year 1761 in Norway.

== Incumbents ==
- Monarch: Frederick V.

== Events ==
- Johan Christopher Wessel was ennobled, and given the noble family name Tordenskiold.

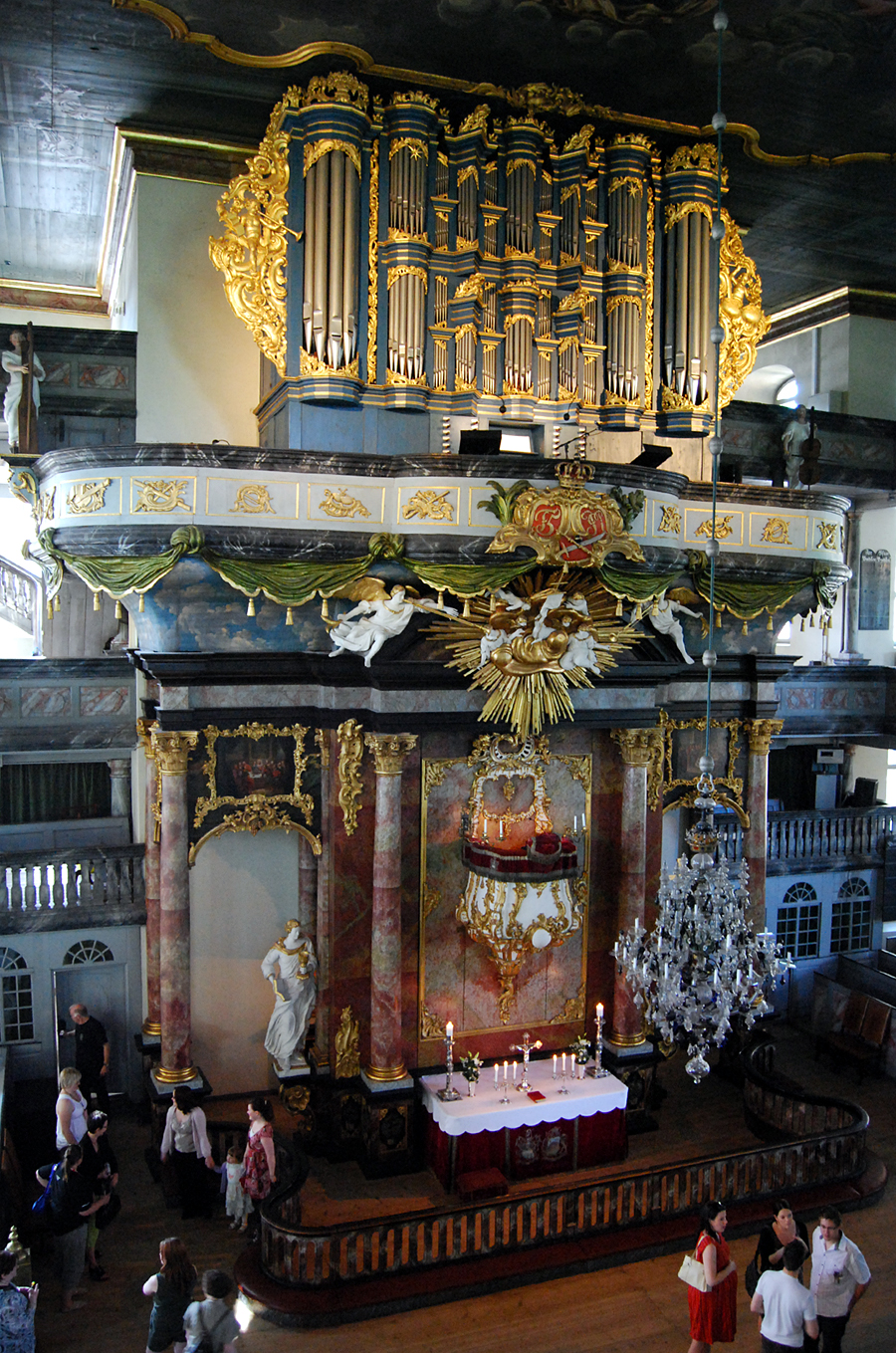
Interior from Kongsberg Church, including the Gloger organ.

== Arts and literature ==
- The construction of Kongsberg Church is completed.
- The construction of Coche Manor in Breivik is completed.

== Births ==
- 26 January - Jens Zetlitz, priest and poet (died 1821)
- 6 December - Erich Haagensen Jaabech, farmer and politician (died 1845)

== Deaths ==
- 14 August - Birgitte Christine Kaas, poet and translator of hymns (born 1682).
