= 1833 in Norway =

- Centuries: 17th; 18th; 19th; 20th; 21st
- Decades: 1810s; 1820s; 1830s; 1840s; 1850s
- See also: 1833 in Sweden; List of years in Norway

Events in the year 1833 in Norway.

== Incumbents ==
- Monarch: Charles III John.
- First Minister: Jonas Collett

== Events ==
- 4 August - Norderhov Spareindretning, Ringerikes first bank is established (today it is known as SpareBank 1 Ringerike Hadeland).
- The town of Vadsø is founded.

== Births ==
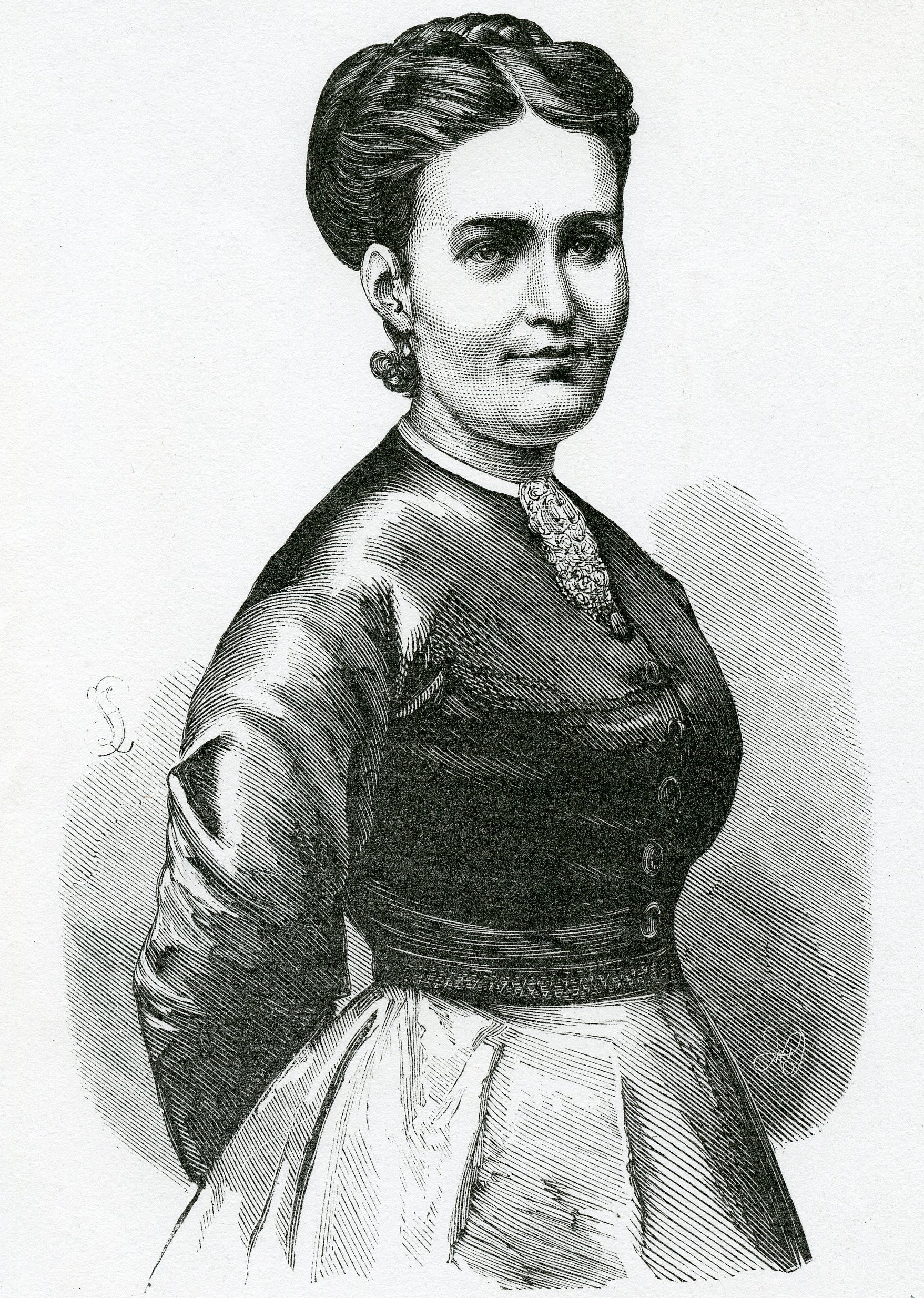
Lucie Wolf

- 5 January – Sophus Bugge, philologist (d.1907)
- 25 May – Lucie Wolf, actress (died 1902).
- 29 June – Peter Waage, chemist and professor (d.1900)
- 6 July – Christian Andreas Irgens, politician (d.1915)
- 10 August – Peter Laurentius Larsen, Norwegian-American Lutheran Educator (d. 1915 in America)
- 6 November – Jonas Lie, novelist (d.1908)

=== Full date unknown ===
- Hans Olsen Hafsrød, politician
- Peder Johan Pedersen Holmesland, politician
- Nils Pedersen Igland, farmer and politician (d.1898)
- Jacob Thurmann Ihlen, politician (d.1903)
- Jacob Otto Lange, politician and Minister (d.1902)
- Oluf Rygh, archeologist, philologist and historian (d.1899)
- Peter Olrog Schjøtt, philologist and politician (d.1926)

== Deaths ==
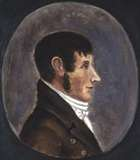
Jørgen Aall

- 7 April – Jørgen Aall, ship-owner and politician (b.1771)

=== Full date unknown ===
- Ole Olsen Evenstad, politician (b.1766)
- Niels Treschow, philosopher and politician (b.1751)
