= Eric Gustaf Tunmarck =

Swedish-Norwegian painter (1729–1789)

Eric Gustaf Tunmarck (1 May 1729 – 1789) was a Swedish-Norwegian painter.

== Biography ==
He was born in Gothenburg, Sweden. His apprenticeship was with Jacob von Schönfeldt (1709–1766) in Gothenburg. He arrived in Kongsberg, Norway during 1760, bringing a certificate from the parish priest for Holmestrand Church in Holmestrand. He worked with Johan Diderich von Dram (ca 1725–1798) contributing to the interior decoration of Kongsberg Church (Kongsberg kirke). He also entered service with Søren Christensen Daugaard who was awarded a contract for the church's ceiling painting.

After this assignment, he established himself as a portrait painter and painter of church interior in Norway. Among his best known portraits is the portrait of senior mining official (berghauptmann) Michael Heltzen who chaired the committee for the construction of Kongsberg Church.

Some of his wall decorations are preserved at the Drammen Museum of Art and Cultural History. He died in Bragernes, Norway during 1789.
