= 1766 in Norway =

- Centuries: 16th; 17th; 18th; 19th; 20th
- Decades: 1740s; 1750s; 1760s; 1770s; 1780s
- See also: 1766 in Denmark; List of years in Norway

Events in the year 1766 in Norway.

== Incumbents ==
- Monarch: Frederick V (until 14 January); then Christian VII.

== Events ==
- 4 April - Schack Carl Rantzau was appointed commander-in-chief of the Norwegian army.
- 4 July - Charles of Hesse was appointed Steward of Norway.

== Births ==
- 23 March - Ole Paus, ship's captain, shipowner and land owner (died 1855)
- 24 April - Carsten Tank, politician (died 1832)
- 6 September - Jens Johan Vangensten, politician (died 1837)
- 23 September - Ole Olsen Evenstad, politician (died 1833)
- 16 November – Peter Nicolaj Arbo, businessman and landowner (died 1827)

== Deaths ==
- 25 March - Anna Krefting, businesswoman (born 1683).
- 28 December - Frederik Adeler, government official and landowner (born 1700)
