= Hersleb =

Hersleb is a surname. Notable people with the surname include:

- Christian Hersleb Horneman (1781–1860), Norwegian jurist and politician
- Hersleb Vogt (1912–1999), Norwegian diplomat
- Jacob Hersleb Darre (1757–1841), Norwegian vicar
- Peder Christian Hersleb Kjerschow (1786–1866), Norwegian clergyman
- Peder Hersleb (1689–1757), Norwegian-Danish bishop
- Peter Hersleb Classen (1738–1825), Norwegian-Danish statesman
- Peter Hersleb Graah Birkeland (1807–1896), Norwegian bishop
- Peter Hersleb Harboe Castberg (1794–1858), Norwegian priest and politician
- Svend Borchmann Hersleb (1784–1836), Norwegian professor of theology who also served one term in the Norwegian Parliament
- Svend Borchmann Hersleb Vogt (1852–1923), Norwegian jurist and politician for the Conservative Party
