= 1712 in Norway =

- Centuries: 16th; 17th; 18th; 19th; 20th
- Decades: 1690s; 1700s; 1710s; 1720s; 1730s
- See also: 1712 in Denmark; List of years in Norway

Events in the year 1712 in Norway.

== Incumbents ==
- Monarch: Frederick IV.

== Events ==
- April - Caspar Herman Hausmann was appointed commander-in-chief of the Norwegian army.
- 4 August - Claus Henrik Vieregg was appointed Vice Steward of Norway.

== Births ==
- 22 June – Michael Heltzen, mining engineer (died in 1770).

== Deaths ==
- 24 June – Hans Munch, theologian and priest, bishop of Christianssand and of Christiania (born 1654).
