= 1771 in Norway =

- Centuries: 17th; 18th; 19th; 20th
- Decades: 1750s; 1760s; 1770s; 1780s; 1790s
- See also: 1771 in Denmark; List of years in Norway

Events in the year 1771 in Norway.

== Incumbents ==
- Monarch: Christian VII.

== Events ==
- 8 February - Jacob Benzon is deposed as Steward of Norway, and the position was vacant until 1809.

== Arts and literature ==
- December - The first theatre in Norway is founded by Martin Nürenbach in Oslo; it would be dissolved in 1772.

=== Full date unknown ===
- The song «Norges Skaal» is written by Johan Nordahl Brun.

== Births ==
- 22 February – Jørgen Aall, ship-owner and politician (died 1833)
- 3 April – Hans Nielsen Hauge, revivalist lay preacher and writer (died 1824)
- 30 May – Ole Olsen Amundrød, farmer, schoolteacher and politician (died 1835)
- 8 August - Andreas Aagaard Kiønig, judge and politician (died 1856)
- 20 August – Jonas Greger Walnum, politician (died 1838)
