= Skollenborg =

Village in Kongsberg Municipality, Norway

- Village
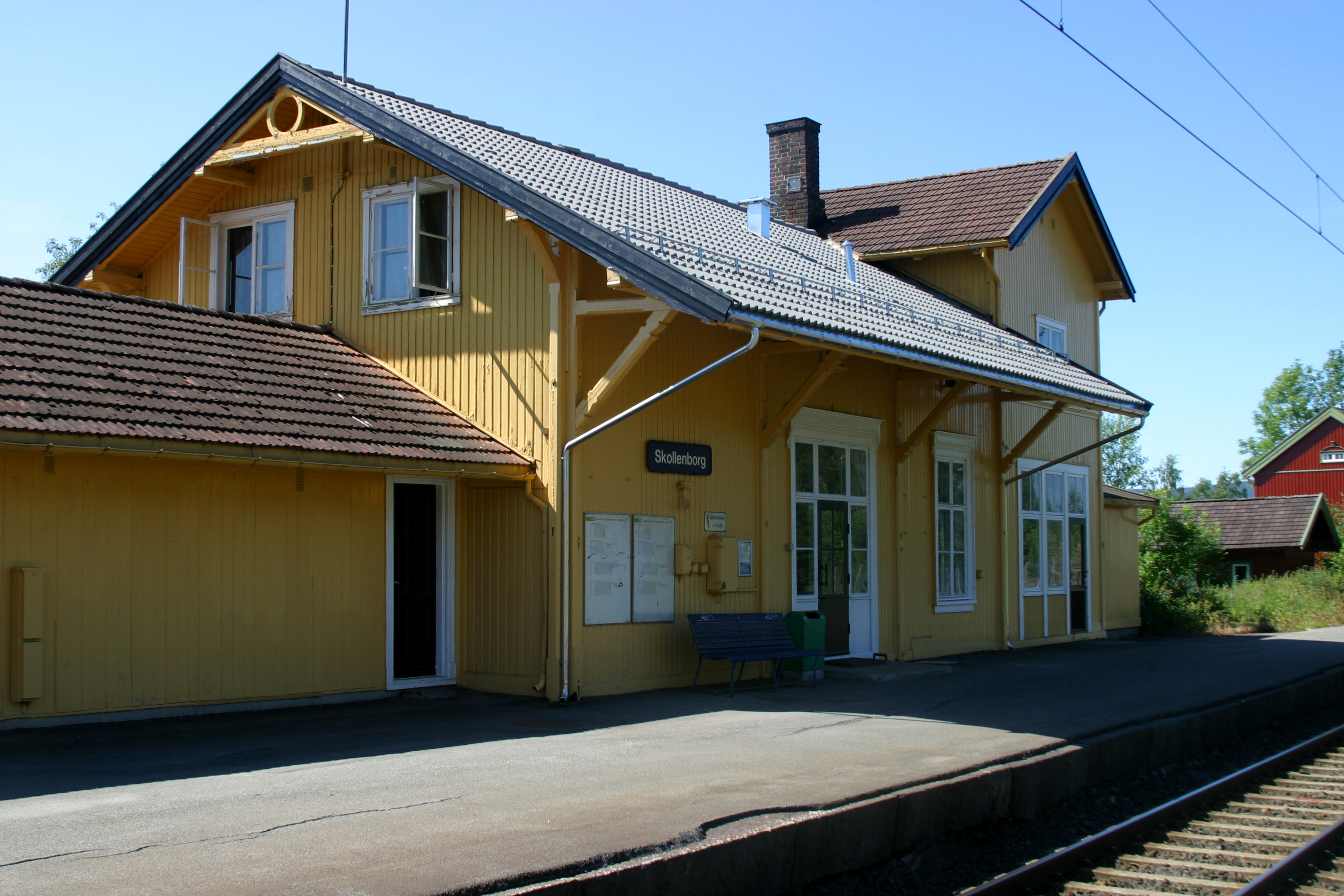
- View of the village train station
- Interactive map of Skollenborg
- Coordinates: 59.62212°N 9.69554°E
- Country: Norway
- Region: Eastern Norway
- County: Buskerud
- District: Lower Buskerud
- Municipality: Kongsberg Municipality

Area
  - Total: 0.47 km^{2} (0.18 sq mi)
- Elevation: 163 m (535 ft)

Population (2014)
  - Total: 323
  - Density: 687/km^{2} (1,780/sq mi)
- Time zone: UTC+01:00 (CET)
  - Summer (DST): UTC+02:00 (CEST)
- Post Code: 3619 Skollenborg

Skollenborg is a village in Kongsberg Municipality in Buskerud county, Norway. The village is located on the north shore of the Numedalslågen river, about 6 kilometres (3.7 mi) southeast of the centre of the town of Kongsberg.

Skollenborg is situated in the valley of Lågendalen on the Numedalslågen river. The village is located at the intersection between Norwegian county roads FV40 and FV286 which leads to European route E134. It is situated about 86 kilometres (53 mi) from Oslo and about 46 kilometres (29 mi) from Drammen.

The 0.47-square-kilometre (120-acre) village had a population (2014) of 323 and a population density of 687 inhabitants per square kilometre (1,780/sq mi). Since 2014, the population and area data for this village area has not been separately tracked by Statistics Norway, because it is now considered part of the Kongsberg urban area.

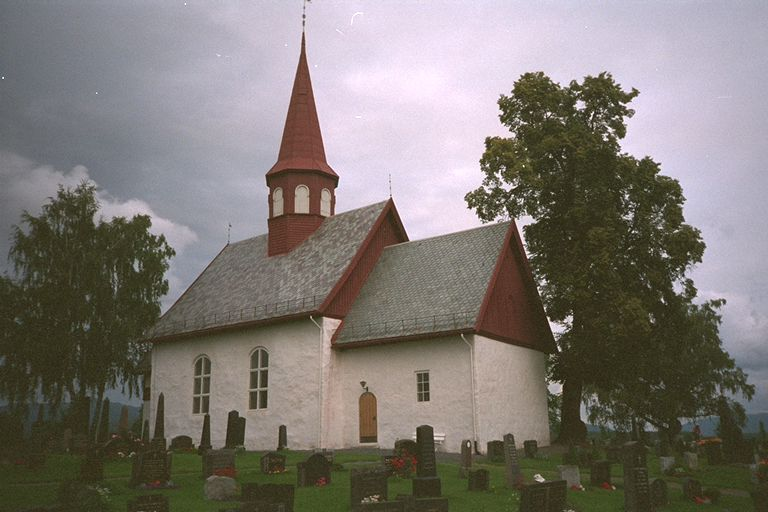
Hedenstad Church

The village of Skollenborg is the site of Skollenborg Station, a former railway station on the Sørlandet Line. The station was served by local trains between Kongsberg via Oslo to Eidsvoll operated by Norges Statsbaner until 2012. To the west of the village lies the Skollenborg power plant.

Hedenstad Church (Hedenstad kirke) is a medieval stone church located just across the river from Skollenberg. It was built in the 12th century. The bell tower dates from 1782. The interior of the church is mainly from the 1800s. The painted by Dina Aschehoug in 1888. The church was restored in 1889 based upon plans by architect Herman Backer. During the 1950s, the church was restored under the direction of architect Thomas Tostrup (1910–1971) and the artistic consultant Finn Krafft (1895–1967).
