= 1765 in Norway =

- Centuries: 16th; 17th; 18th; 19th; 20th
- Decades: 1740s; 1750s; 1760s; 1770s; 1780s
- See also: 1765 in Denmark; List of years in Norway

Events in the year 1765 in Norway.

== Incumbents ==
- Monarch: Frederick V.

== Events ==
- 18 April — Strilekrigen in Bergen, a farmer's rebellion in Bergen.
- The town of Langesund was founded.

== Arts and literature ==
- 8 October — Bergen Philharmonic Orchestra was founded.

== Births ==
- 11 February – Ole Rasmussen Apeness, district sheriff, soldier, and farmer (died 1859)

=== Full date unknown ===
- Knut Andreas Pettersen Agersborg, politician (died 1847)
- Niels Stockfleth Darre, military officer (died 1809)
- Mathias Hagerup, politician (died 1822)
- Osmund Andersen Lømsland, farmer and politician (died 1841)

== Deaths ==
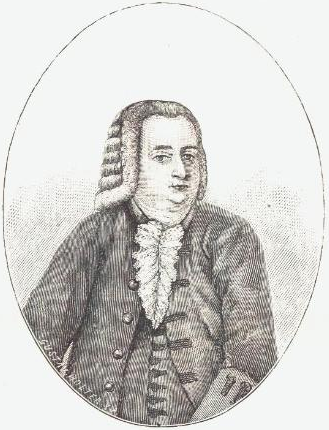
Christian Ancher

- 9 January – Christian Ancher, merchant, timber trader and ship owner (born 1711).
- 21 January – Christian Braunmann Tullin, businessman and poet (born 1728).
