= Joachim Andreas Stukenbrock =

Joachim Andreas Stukenbrock (1699 – 26 September 1756) was a Germany-born, Norwegian mining official.

He was born at Blankenburg in the mining district of Harz, (now Saxony-Anhalt), Germany. He was enrolled at the University of Helmstedt in 1719. In 1730, he was mining inspector for the iron mines of the Duchy of Brunswick-Lüneburg. In 1732, he was appointed the first mining inspector (Berghauptmann) at the Kongsberg Silver Mines. At the initiative of Christian Ernest of Stolberg-Wernigerode, these were developed to become the largest mines in Norway.

Stukenbrock also designed the plans for the Kongsberg Church. Construction of the church lasted from 1740 to 1761, with completion after his death in 1756. He was replaced in the position of mining inspector by Michael Heltzen.
