= 1769 in Norway =

- Centuries: 16th; 17th; 18th; 19th; 20th
- Decades: 1740s; 1750s; 1760s; 1770s; 1780s
- See also: 1769 in Denmark; List of years in Norway

Events in the year 1769 in Norway.

== Incumbents ==
- Monarch: Christian VII.

== Events ==
- 15 August – The first census in Denmark-Norway to attempt completely covering all citizens (including women and children who had previously been listed only as numbers) takes place. At that point, Norway had 774,000 citizens.
- 14 September - Start of the Dano–Algerian War.
- Maximilian Hell and his assistant János Sajnovics traveled to Vardø to observe the 1769 transit of Venus.

== Births ==
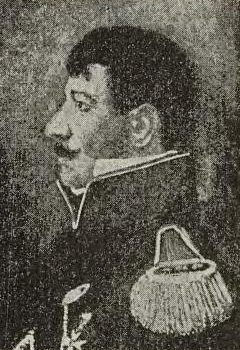
Eilert Ramm

- 8 January — Claus Pavels, bishop (died 1822)
- 25 February — Thomas Fasting, naval officer and government minister (died 1841)
- 14 April — Andreas Landmark, politician (died 1839)
- 4 May – Eilert Waldemar Preben Ramm, military officer and politician (d. 1837).
- 27 August – Hans Jacob Stabel, priest and politician (died 1836)

== Deaths ==
- 24 February – Johan von Mangelsen, military officer and businessperson (born 1694).
