= 1760 in Norway =

- Centuries: 16th; 17th; 18th; 19th; 20th
- Decades: 1740s; 1750s; 1760s; 1770s; 1780s
- See also: 1760 in Denmark; List of years in Norway

Events in the year 1760 in Norway.

== Incumbents ==
- Monarch: Frederick V.

== Events ==
- Royal Norwegian Society of Sciences and Letters was founded in Trondheim by the bishop of Nidaros Johan Ernst Gunnerus, headmaster at the Trondheim Cathedral School Gerhard Schøning and Councillor of State Peter Frederik Suhm under the name Det Trondhiemske Selskab (the Trondheim Society).

== Births ==
- 30 January – Jonas Rein, priest, poet and member of the Norwegian Constituent Assembly at Eidsvoll (died 1821)
- 15 February – Lars Ingier, military officer, road manager, land owner and mill owner (died 1828).
- 4 March – Gabriel Schanche Kielland, businessman and ship owner (died 1821)
- 30 October – Matz Jenssen, businessperson (died 1813)

=== Full date unknown ===
- Lars Jakobson Thingnæsset, farmer and politician (died 1829)
