= 1715 in Norway =

- Centuries: 16th; 17th; 18th; 19th; 20th
- Decades: 1690s; 1700s; 1710s; 1720s; 1730s
- See also: 1715 in Denmark; List of years in Norway

Events in the year 1715 in Norway.

== Incumbents ==
- Monarch: Frederick IV.

== Events ==
- 10 March - Birgitte Haldorsdatter was judged guilty of witchcraft in Sørum and sentenced to life imprisonment. She is the last person confirmed to have been sentenced guilty of witchcraft in Norway.
- 19 April - Start of the Sami mission by the College of Missions.

== Arts and literature ==
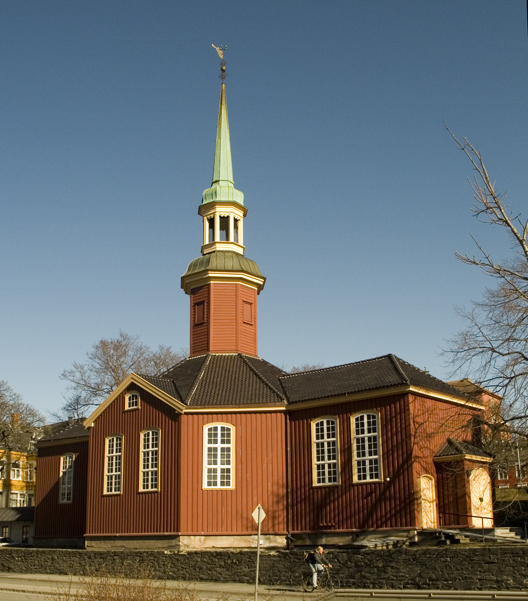
Bakke Church

- Bakke Church was built.

== Births ==
- Peder Hjort, businessperson (died 1789)

== Deaths ==
- Hans Paus, priest and poet (born 1656).
