= 1763 in Norway =

- Centuries: 16th; 17th; 18th; 19th; 20th
- Decades: 1740s; 1750s; 1760s; 1770s; 1780s
- See also: 1763 in Denmark; List of years in Norway

Events in the year 1763 in Norway.

== Incumbents ==
- Monarch: Frederick V.

== Events ==
- Bergenhus amt was divided in two, creating the following amt – Nordre Bergenhus amt and Søndre Bergenhus amt.

== Arts and literature ==
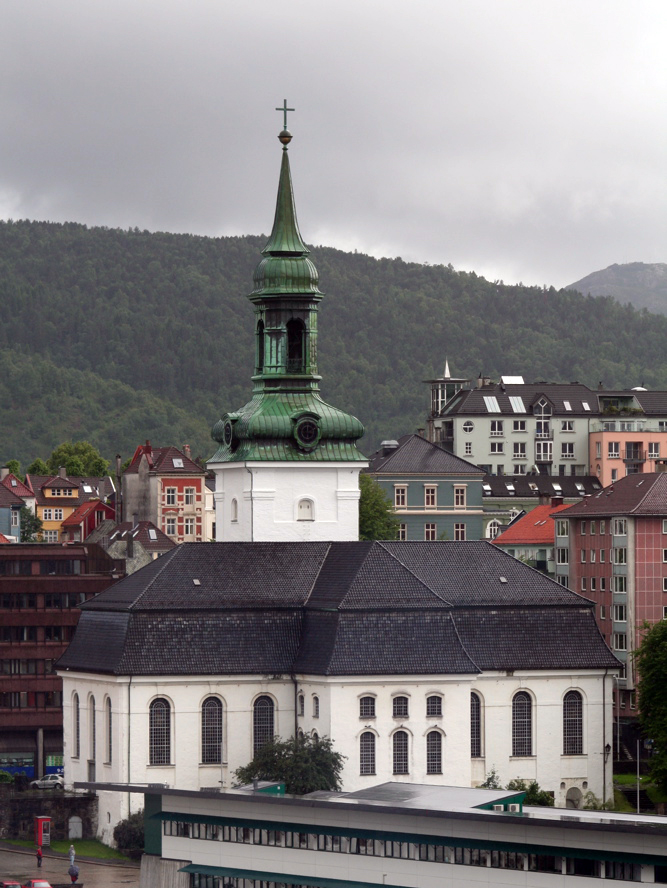
Nykirken in Bergen

- 25 May – The first newspaper in Norway ("Norske Intelligenz-Seddeler") published its first issue.
- 23 November – Nykirken was consecrated.

== Births ==
- 24 January – Peder von Cappelen, merchant and politician (d. 1837).

=== Full date unknown ===
- Johan Andreas Altenburg, merchant and shipowner (died 1824)
- Jens Esmark, mountain climber and professor of mineralogy (died 1839)
- Diderik Hegermann, politician and Minister (died 1835)

== Deaths ==
- 18 May - Anders Daae, priest and landowner (born 1680)
