= Gottfried Heinrich Gloger =

German organist and organ builder (1710–1779)

Gottfried Heinrich Gloger (1710 Hannover – April 1779 Verdal) was a German organ builder and organist.

== Biography ==
Gloger was born as the third son of the organbuilder Johann Heinrich Gloger. His elder brothers were Johann Wilhelm Gloger (1702–1760) and Dietrich Christoph Gloger (c. 1704–1708 – 1773); all three studied under their father. His first organ-building training was under his father, afterwards he moved onto studying with the Arp Schnitger students Christian Vater and the Danish Lambert Daniel Kastens. Gloger came to Norway as early as 1738, and in 1746 the King of Norway awarded him the royal privilege of organ builder. He was the greatest organ builder in Norway during the 18th century, which was the golden age of European organbuilding.

Gloger married four times (1745–1763 with Pernille Nielsdatter Klastrup, 1770–1772 with Christina Lund, 1773 with Lucia Rasbech and 1774 until his death with Ester Abel Parelius). His first three wives died before him. His most famous work is the organ of the Kongsberg Church, a very significant amount of stops survive. It was restored in the 1980s by Jürgen Ahrend. In addition, the facades of other instruments he built survive.
