= Skollenborg Station =

Railway station in Kongsberg Municipality, Norway

Skollenborg
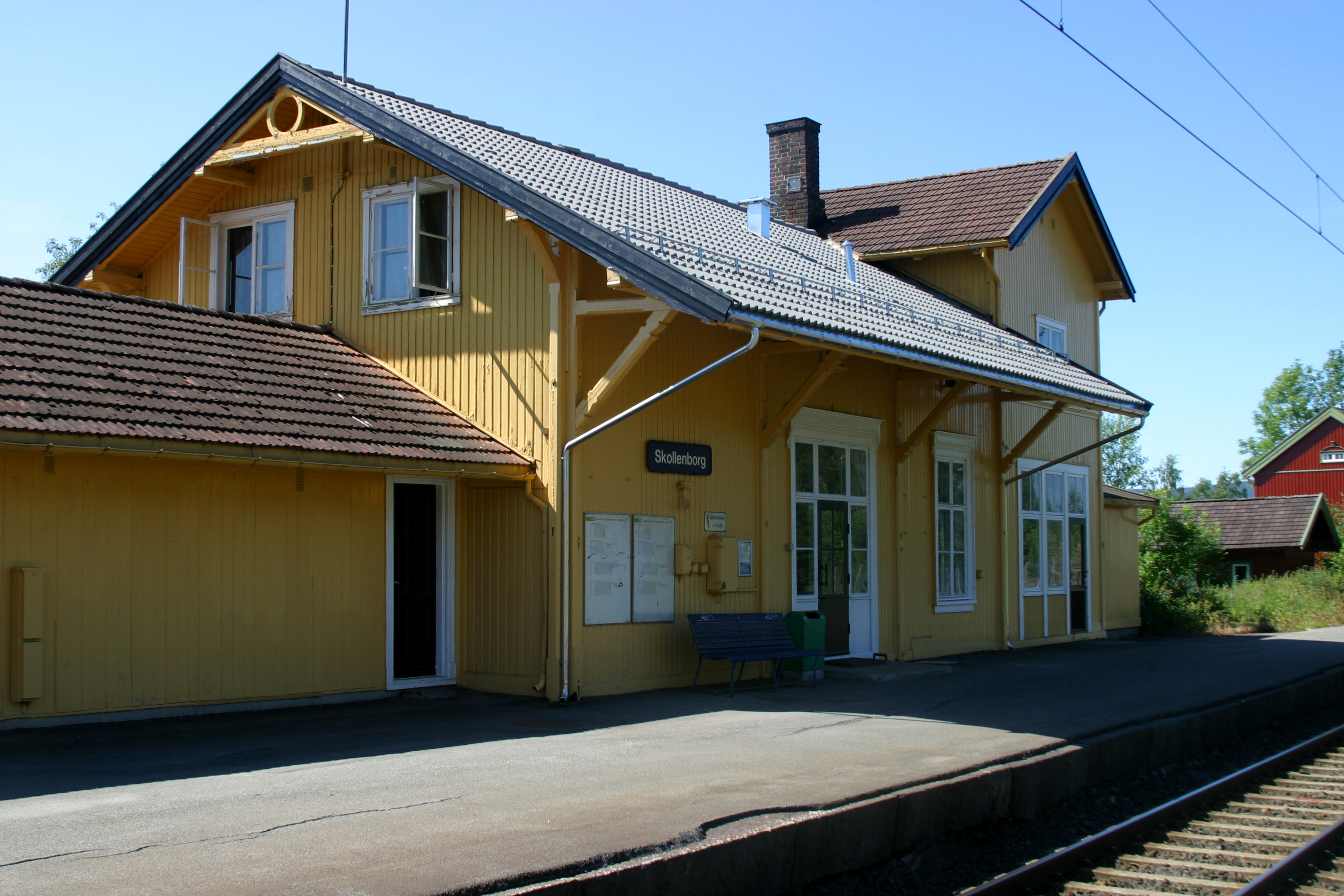

General information
- Location: Skollenborg, Kongsberg Municipality; Norway
- Coordinates: 59°37′22″N 9°41′40″E
- Elevation: 163 m (535 ft)
- Owner: Bane NOR
- Line: Sørlandet Line
- Distance: 92.59 km (57.53 mi)
- Platforms: 2

Construction
- Architect: Georg Andreas Bull

History
- Opened: November 9, 1871
Location

Skollenborg Station (Norwegian: Skollenborg stasjon) is a railway station located in the village of Skollenborg in Kongsberg Municipality in Buskerud county, Norway. The station is on the Sørlandet Line railway. Skollenborg Station was served by local trains between Kongsberg via Oslo to Eidsvoll until December 2012.

== History ==
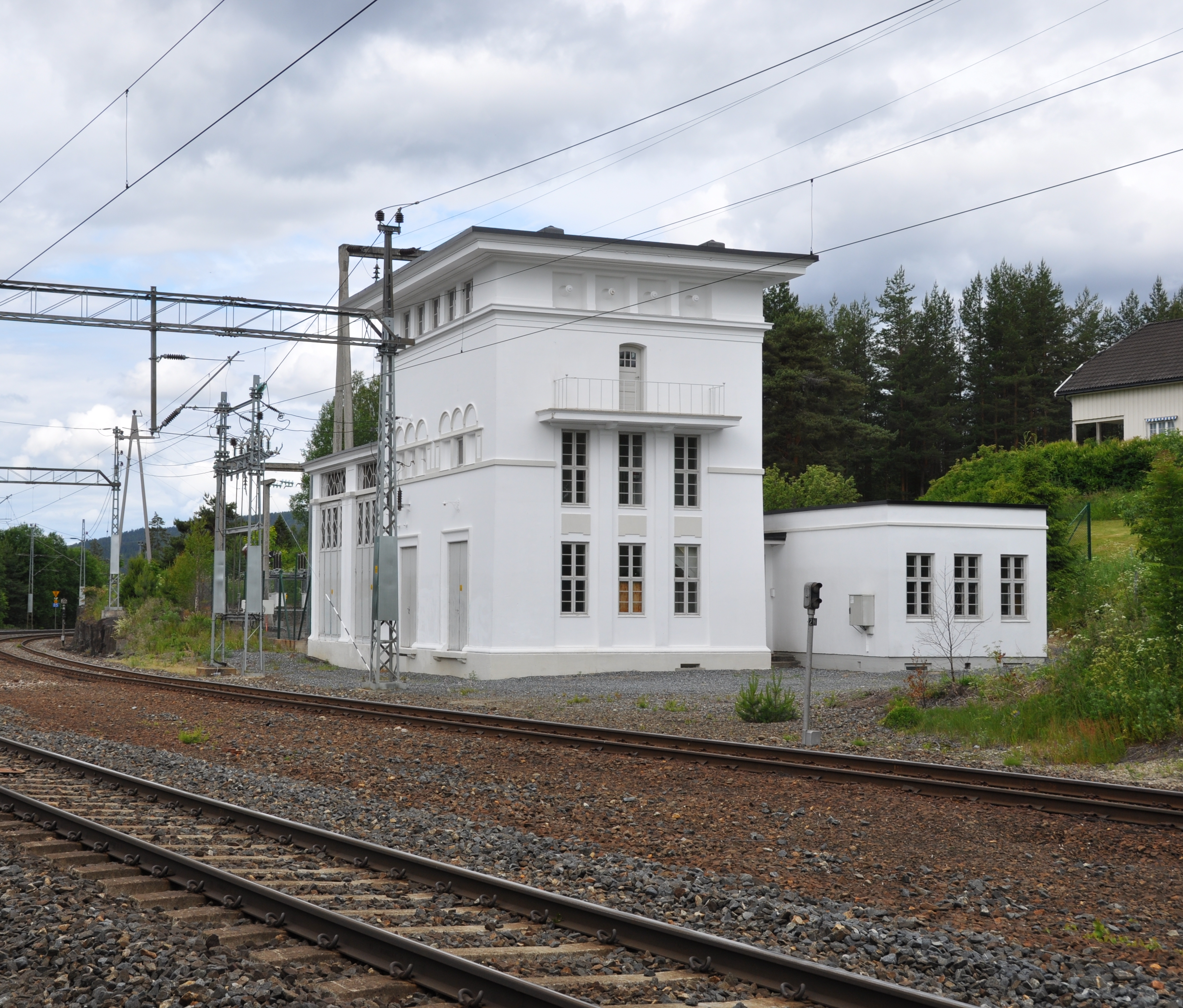
Skollenborg Transformer Substation

The station was opened in 1871 as a branch line of Randsfjorden Line was opened between Hokksund and Kongsberg. The Skollenborg Station building was designed by architect Georg Andreas Bull. Skollenborg transformer substation was designed by Gudmund Hoel and was built in 1926.

Preceding station		Following station
Kongsberg	Sørlandet Line	Darbu
