= 1768 in Norway =

- Centuries: 16th; 17th; 18th; 19th; 20th
- Decades: 1740s; 1750s; 1760s; 1770s; 1780s
- See also: 1768 in Denmark; List of years in Norway

Events in the year 1768 in Norway.

== Incumbents ==
- Monarch: Christian VII.

== Events ==
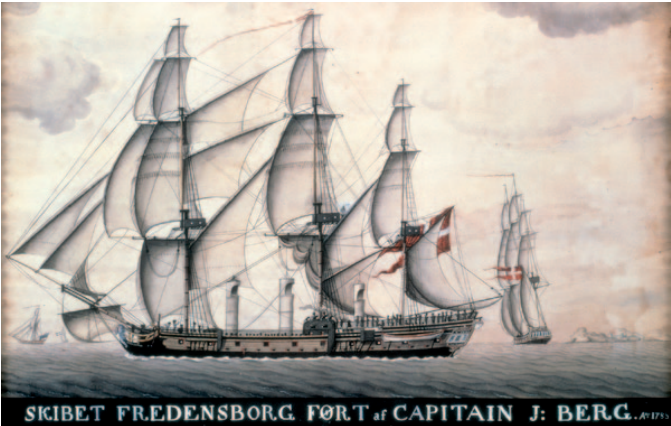
The slave ship Fredensborg

- 1 December — The slave ship Fredensborg sinks off Tromøya.

== Arts and literature ==
- January - Gunnerus Library, the oldest scientific library in Norway is opened in Trondheim.

== Births ==
=== Full date unknown ===
- Johan Ernst Berg, politician (died 1828)

== Deaths ==
- 12 January – Joen Jacobsen, master builder (born 1714).
- 24 January – Morten Leuch, timber merchant and landowner (born 1732).
