= 1714 in Norway =

- Centuries: 16th; 17th; 18th; 19th; 20th
- Decades: 1690s; 1700s; 1710s; 1720s; 1730s
- See also: 1714 in Denmark; List of years in Norway

Events in the year 1714 in Norway.

== Incumbents ==
- Monarch: Frederick IV.

== Events ==
- The Norwegian Treasury is established. The first treasury department for all of Norway.
- 10 December – The College of Missions is established.

== Births ==
- 1 February – Nicolaus Christian Friis, priest and writer (died in 1777).

=== Full date missing ===
- Joen Jacobsen, master builder (died 1768).
