= 1767 in Norway =

- Centuries: 16th; 17th; 18th; 19th; 20th
- Decades: 1740s; 1750s; 1760s; 1770s; 1780s
- See also: 1767 in Denmark; List of years in Norway

Events in the year 1767 in Norway.

== Incumbents ==
- Monarch: Christian VII.

== Events ==
- 17 July — The Trondheim Society received royal affirmation of its status as the Royal Norwegian Society of Sciences and Letters.
- The first known competition of winter sport biathlon takes place, in Norway.
- The first sections of the Hotel Refsnes Gods are erected.

== Arts and literature ==
- 3 July — Norway's oldest newspaper, still in print, Adresseavisen, is founded (first edition published this date).

== Births ==
- 4 February - Hans Hein Nysom, priest and politician (died 1831).
- 26 August – Christopher Borgersen Hoen, farmer and politician (died 1845).
- 9 September - Hans Henrik Rode, military officer (died 1830).

== Deaths ==
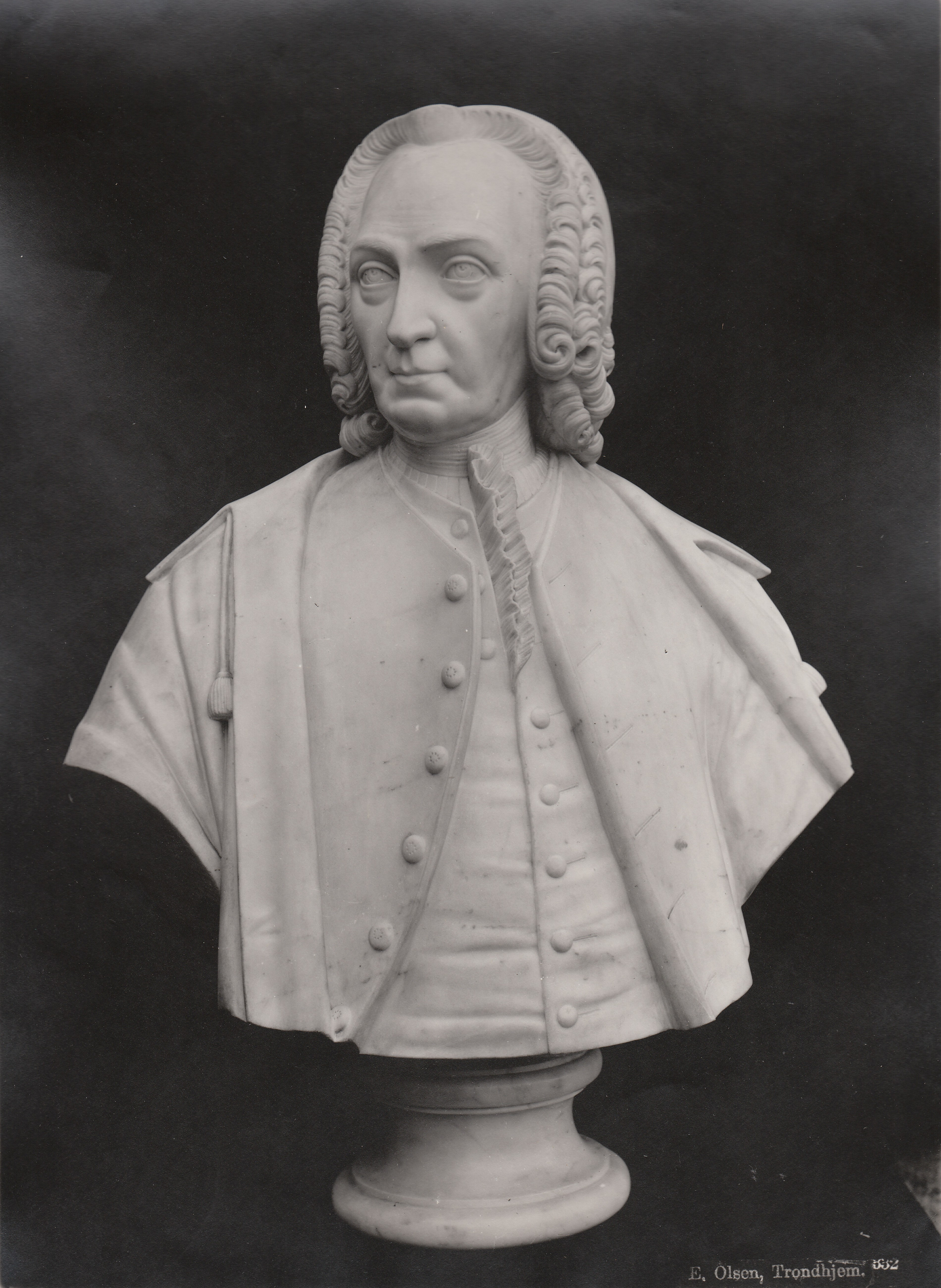
Thomas Angell

- 19 September - Thomas Angell, merchant and philanthropist (born 1692).
- 16 December – Baltzer Fleischer, civil servant and county governor (born 1703).
