= 1764 in Norway =

- Centuries: 17th; 18th; 19th; 20th
- Decades: 1740s; 1750s; 1760s; 1770s; 1780s
- See also: 1764 in Denmark; List of years in Norway

Events in the year 1764 in Norway.

== Incumbents ==
- Monarch: Frederick V.

== Events ==
- January – Waldemar Hermann Schmettau was appointed commander-in-chief of the Norwegian army.
- Porsgrunn prestegjeld (parish) was separated from the ancient rural parishes of Eidanger prestegjeld, Solum prestegjeld, and Gjerpen prestegjeld.
- The old city (original core) of Fredrikstad burns down.

== Births ==
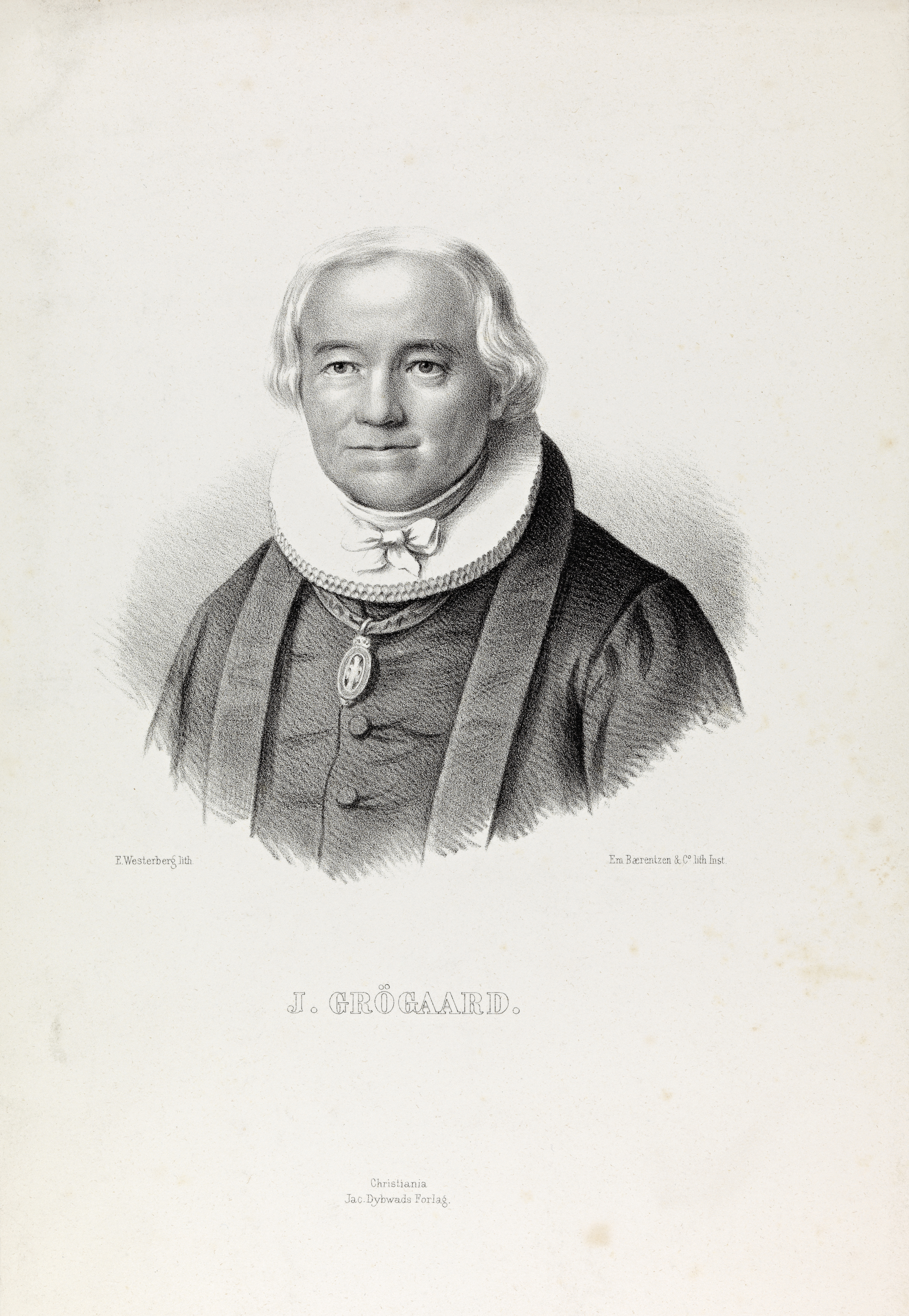
Hans Jacob Grøgaard

- 3 March – Jens Stub, politician (died 1819)
- 5 April – Hans Jacob Grøgaard, priest and writer (died 1836).
- 22 August - Mathias Sommerhielm, politician (died 1827)
- 31 August – Johan August Sandels, soldier and politician (died 1831)
- 2 December - Peter Olivarius Bugge, bishop (died 1849)

=== Full date unknown ===
- Anders Olson Lysne, leader of a farmer rebellion (died 1803)
