= Kongsberg Church =

Church in Buskerud, Norway

- Kongsberg kirke
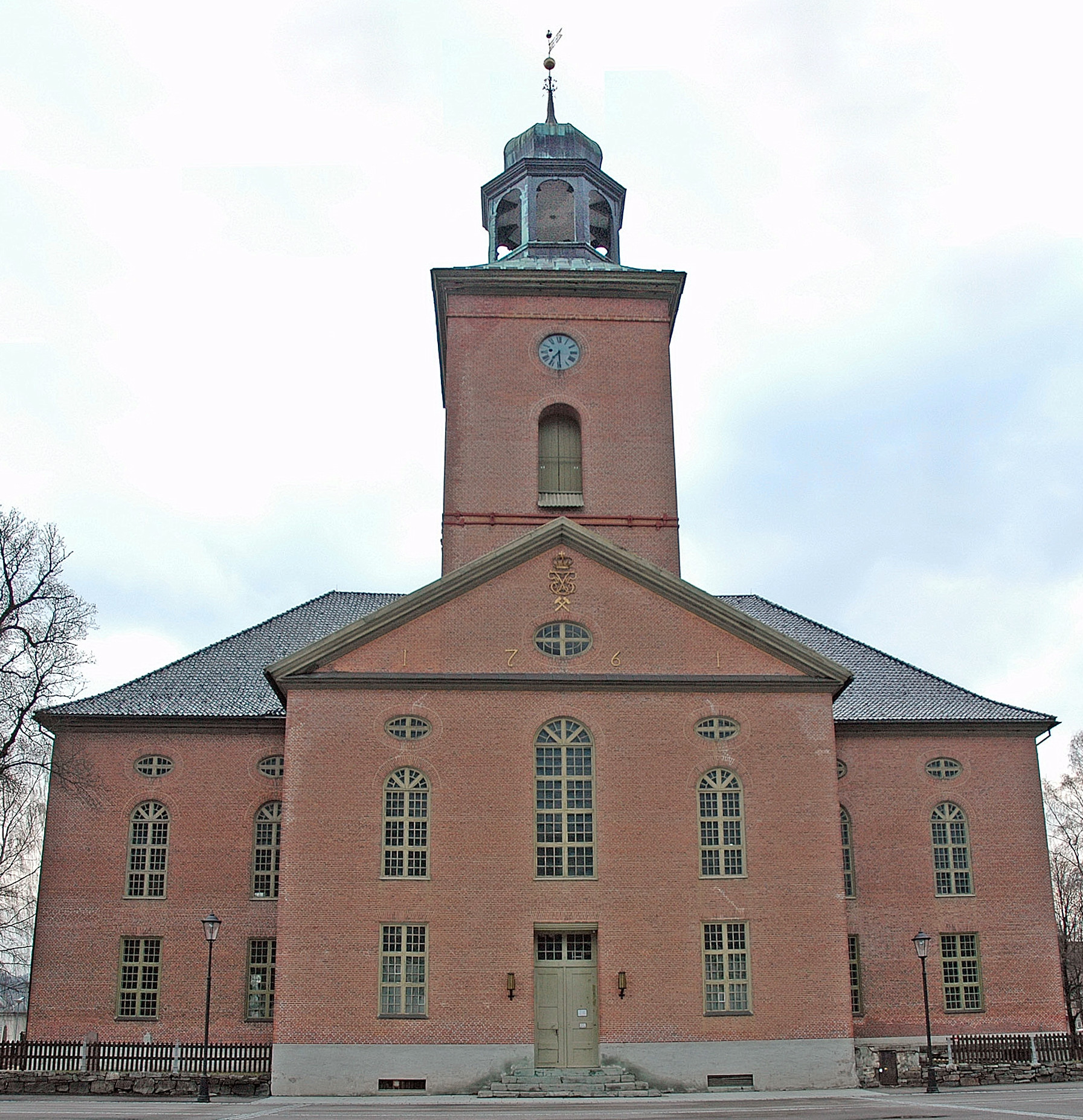
- View of the church
- Kongsberg Church
- 59°39′57″N 9°38′47″E
- Location: Kongsberg Municipality, Buskerud
- Country: Norway
- Denomination: Church of Norway
- Churchmanship: Evangelical Lutheran

History
- Status: Parish church
- Founded: 1632
- Consecrated: 1761

Architecture
- Functional status: Active
- Architect: Joachim Andreas Stukenbrock
- Architectural type: Cruciform
- Style: Rococo
- Completed: 1761 (265 years ago)

Specifications
- Capacity: 1100
- Materials: Brick

Administration
- Diocese: Tunsberg
- Deanery: Kongsberg prosti
- Parish: Kongsberg og Jondalen
- Norwegian Cultural Heritage Site
- Type: Church
- Status: Automatically protected
- ID: 84811

Kongsberg Church (Norwegian: Kongsberg kirke) is a parish church of the Church of Norway in Kongsberg Municipality in Buskerud county, Norway. It is located in the town of Kongsberg. It is one of the churches for the Kongsberg og Jondalen parish which is part of the Kongsberg prosti (deanery) in the Diocese of Tunsberg. The red brick church was built in a Baroque cruciform design in 1761 using plans drawn up by the architect Joachim Andreas Stukenbrock. The design of the church was inspired by Garnisons Church in Copenhagen, and it has a simple exterior with a richly decorated rococo interior. The church seats about 1100 people.

== History ==
The town of Kongsberg was founded as a bergstad in 1624. Originally it did not have a church and residents had to go to the nearby Hedenstad Church. In 1632, after the great fire of 1631, a new wooden cruciform church was built in the northern part of the cemetery. It was 38 metres (125 ft) long, a considerable length for its time. The church had second floor seating galleries along the long walls (north and south). The building was restored in 1671. Over time, the church became too small for the growing town so plans were made for a new, much larger church building.

A new, brick building was built nearby over a long period of time, starting in the summer of 1739 and it was consecrated on 17 September 1761, without the church being fully furnished. The final inspection upon completion of the building took place in 1765. The long construction period is partly due to the high level of ambition and at times a general lack of money, which led to several years of work being stopped. It is also said to have had some significance that it was so resource-intensive to transport building materials to Kongsberg. Joachim Andreas Stukenbrock submitted architectural drawings in April 1739, and the somewhat austere exterior of the church is mainly his work. After Stukenbrock's death, the church was completed with his successor Michael Heltzen as architect. It is possibly thanks to him that the church interior stands in such contrast to the church's sober exterior, although it seems that Stukenbrock was on the same track, as is evident from his statement: "The church should be like a human being. Simple on the outside, but the further you go inside, the more beautiful it should become. The main entrance is in the east, and the west wall facing Kirketorget and Bergseminaret to the west is technically the back of the church, although the tower contributes to many thinking of it as the front. (At the top of the gable we see Frederik V's monogram and the town's coat of arms.)

In 1814, this church served as an election church (Norwegian: valgkirke). Together with more than 300 other parish churches across Norway, it was a polling station for elections to the 1814 Norwegian Constituent Assembly which wrote the Constitution of Norway. This was Norway's first national election. Each church parish was a constituency that elected people called "electors" who later met together in each county to elect the representatives for the assembly that was to meet at Eidsvoll Manor later that year.

== Design ==
Virtually all fixtures in the church are made of wood, but the pillars and surfaces have been marbled. The whole church has a cool blue color as a result. On either side of the altar and pulpit are the pillars that bear the organ gallery above. The Baroque organ is from 1765 and was made by organ builder Gottfried Heinrich Gloger. In the 1850s it was restored by Paul Brantzeg and in 1932 by Josef Hilmar Jørgensen. In 1928, Tinius Olsen gave a major donation to the restoration of the organ which had suffered water damage in the late 1880s. The baptismal font was carved out of marble extracted from Holmestrand in Vestfold. The chandeliers were produced at Nøstetangen glassverk in Hokksund during the second half of the 1700s.

The sanctuary includes ceiling decorations by Eric Gustav Tunmarck. Among the driving forces behind the decoration and interior of the church was mining engineer Michael Heltzen.

== Media gallery ==
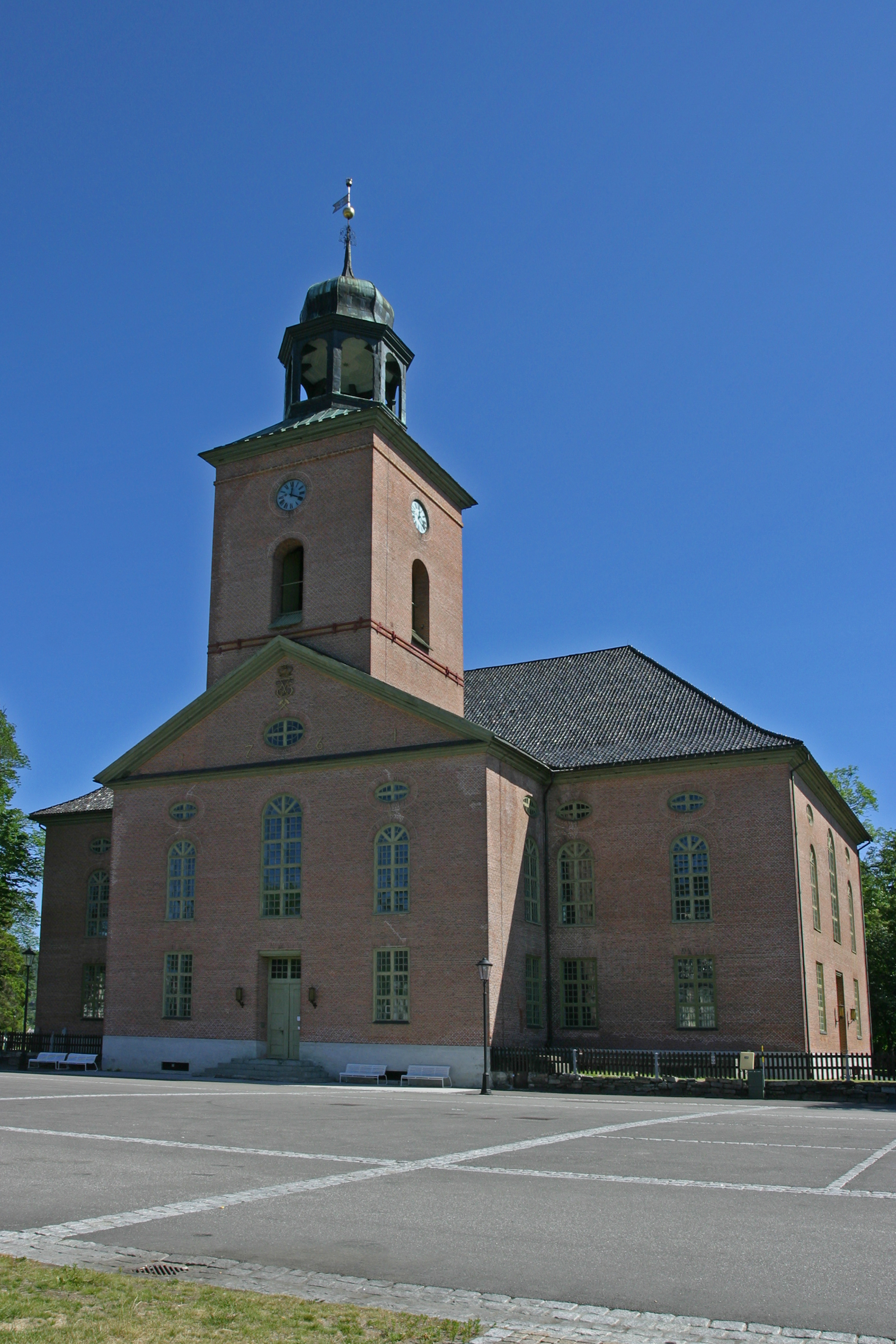

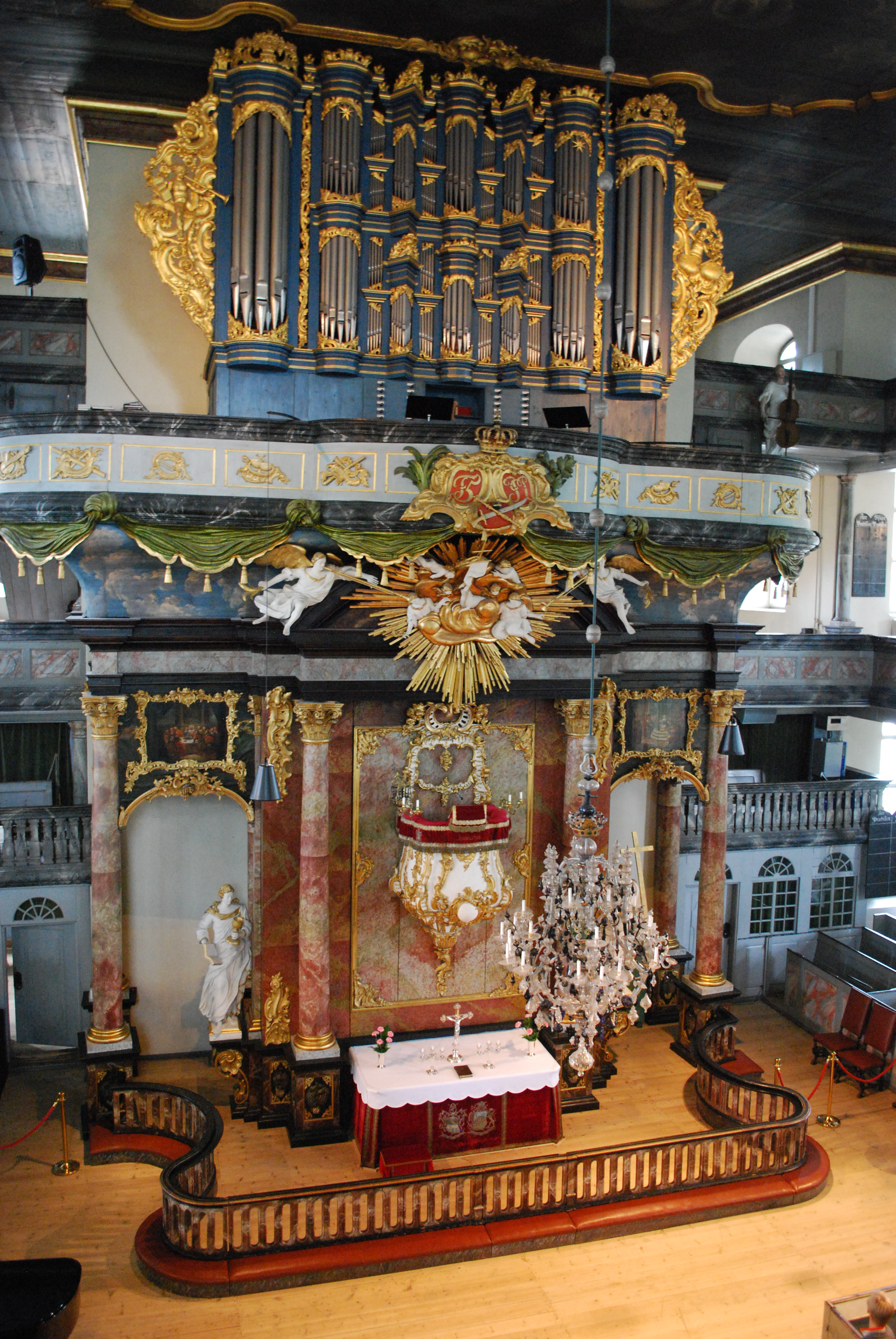
Kongsberg Church Chancel

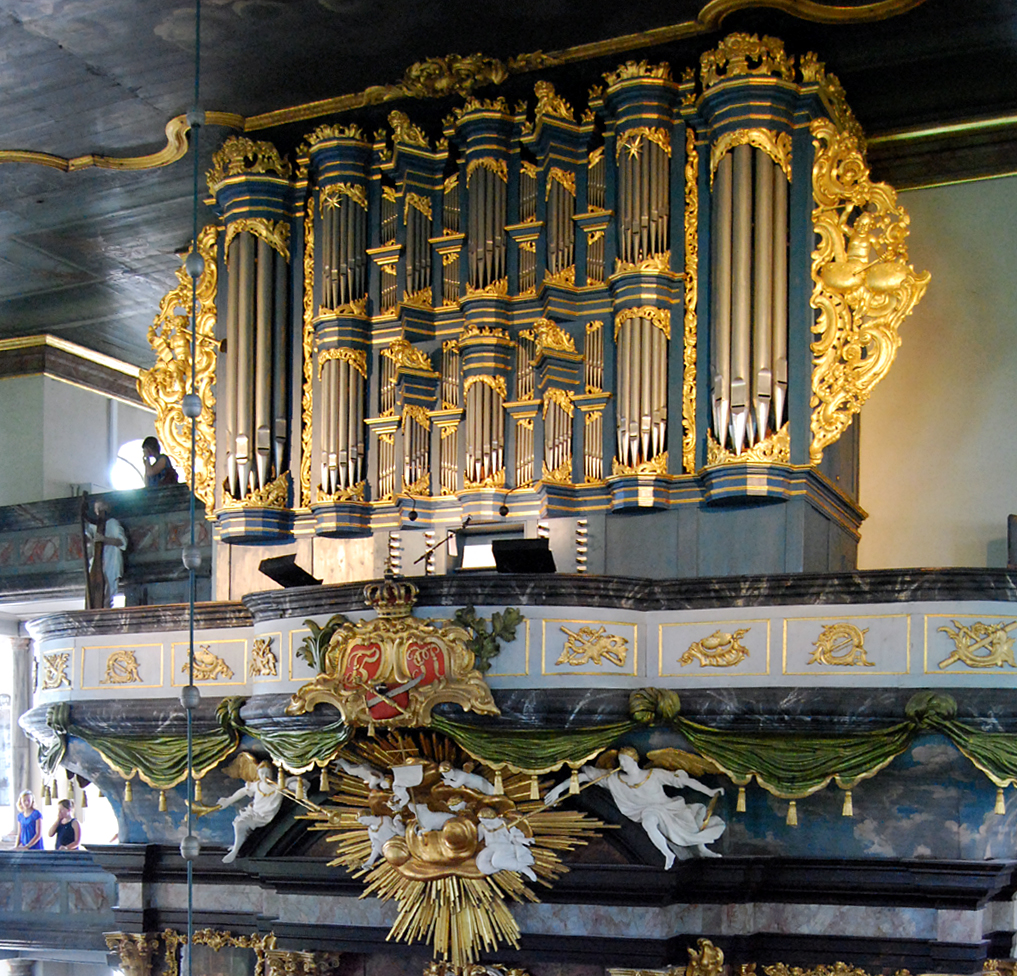
Gloger organ

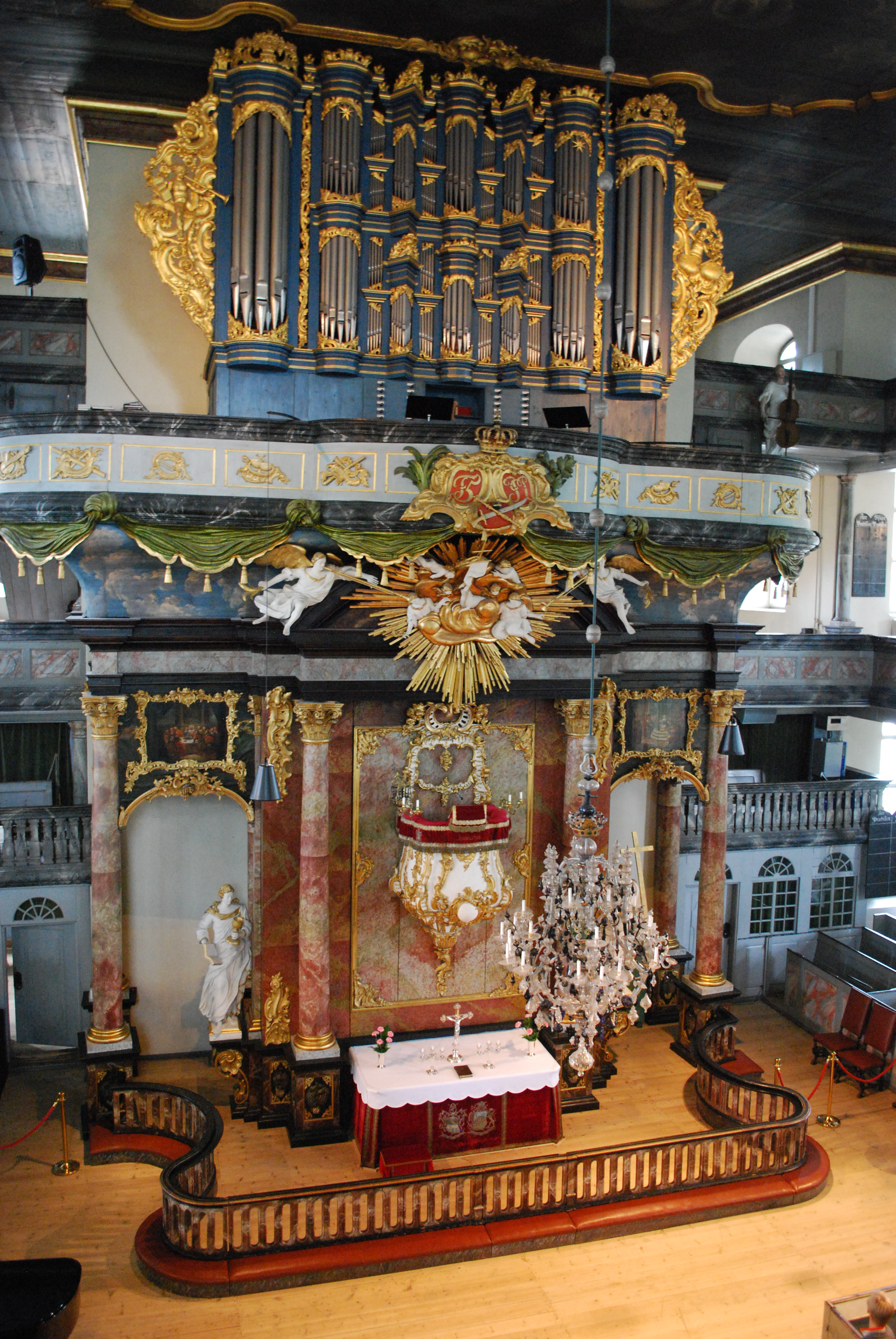
Altar

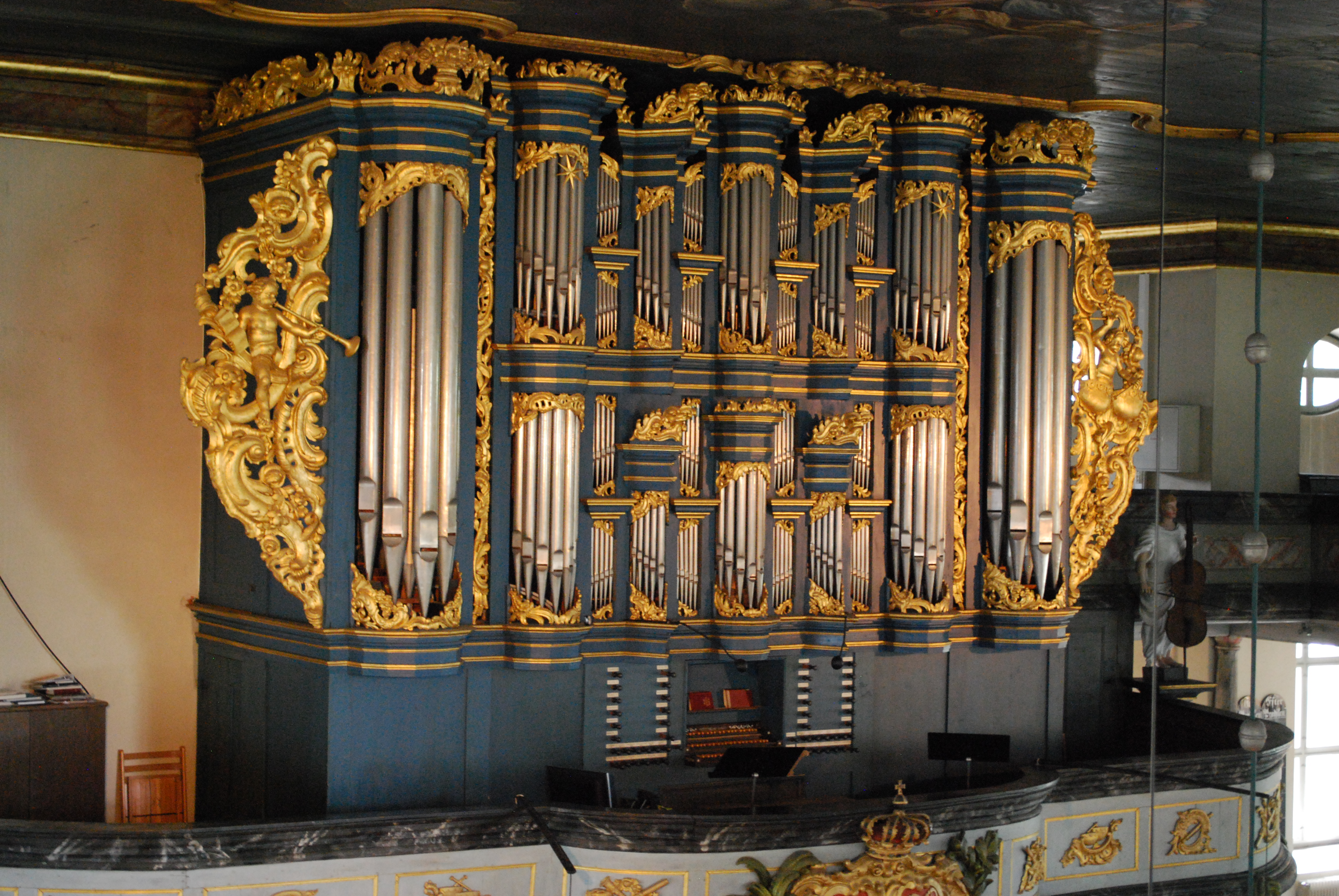
Gloger organ

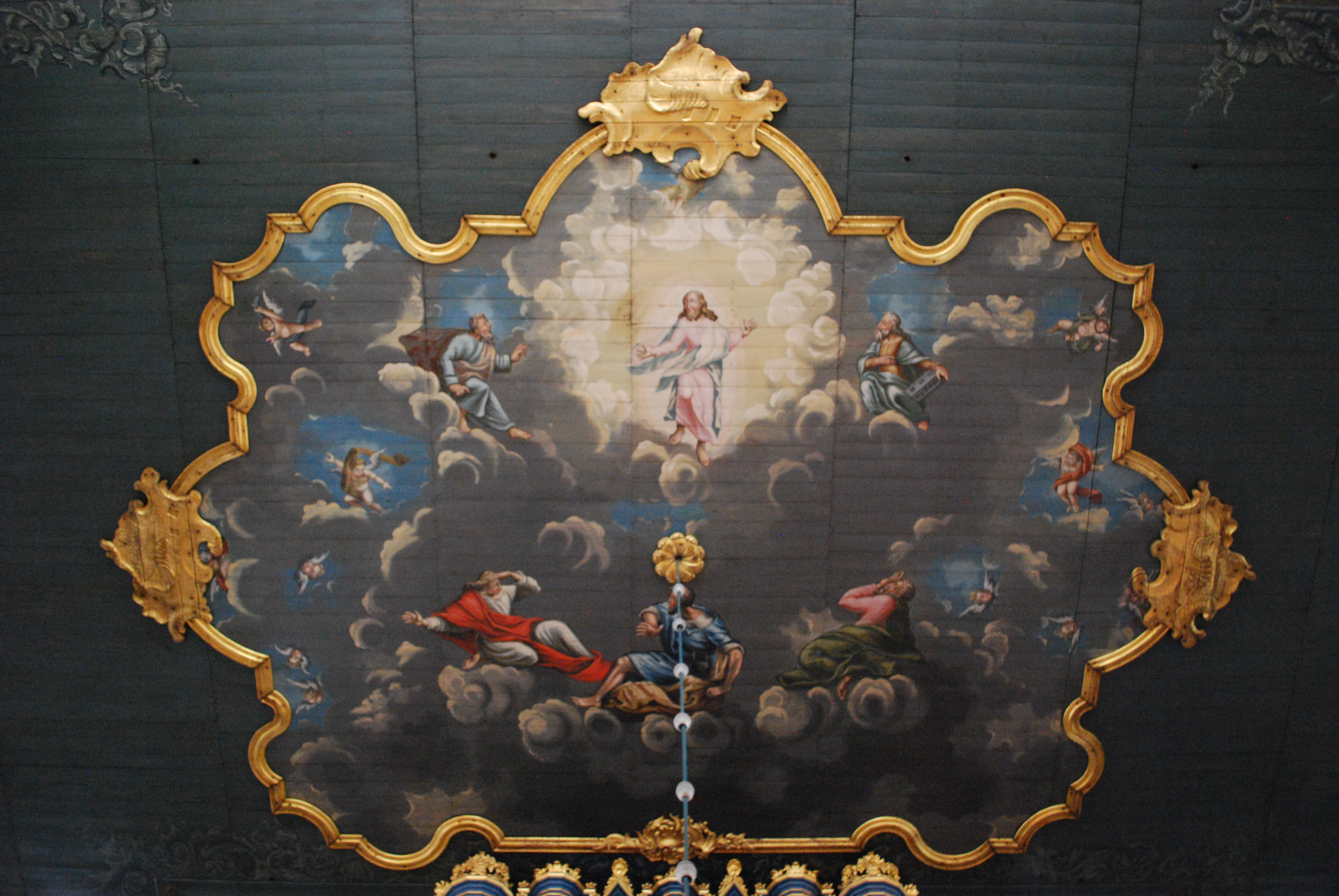
Ceiling

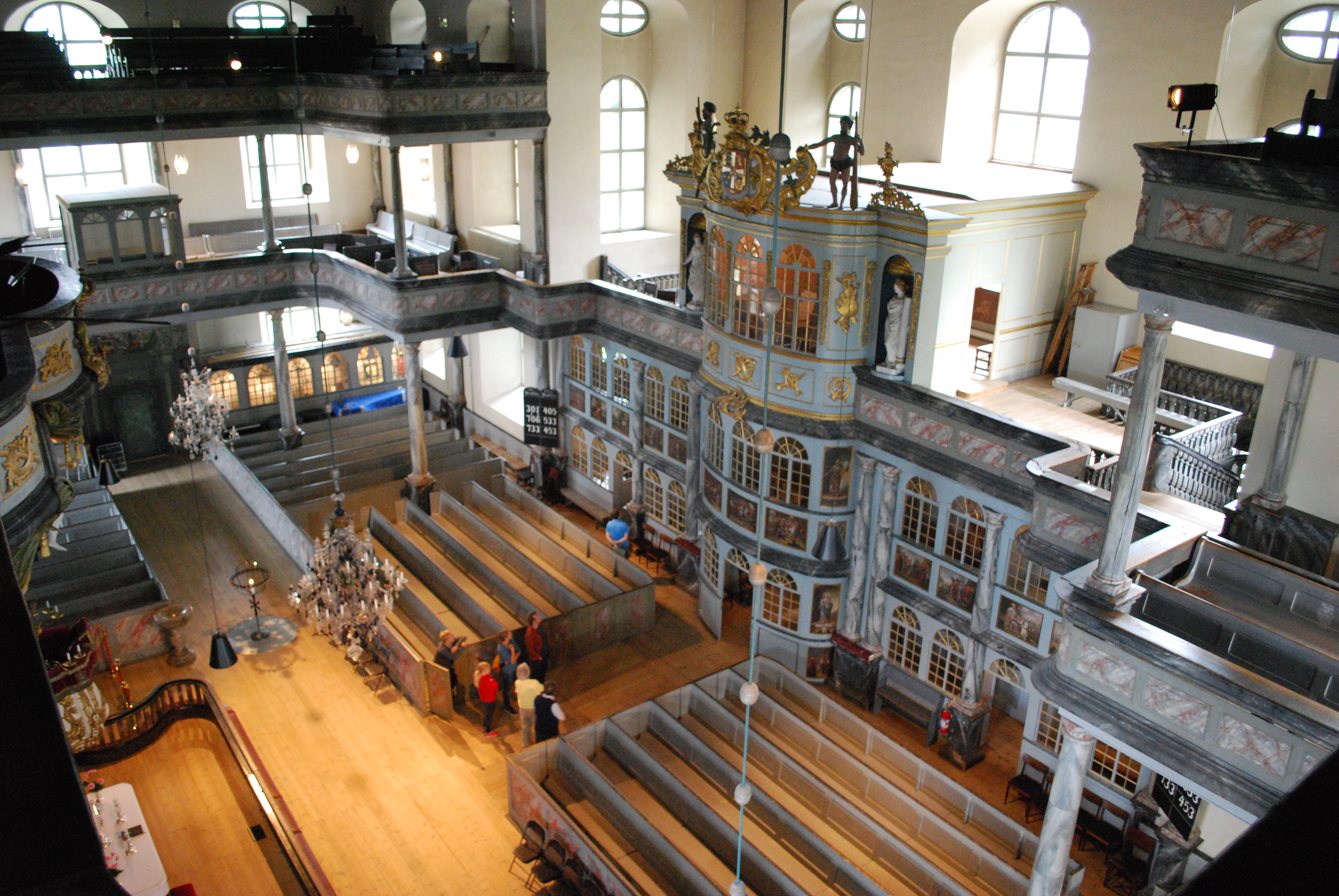
Sanctuary

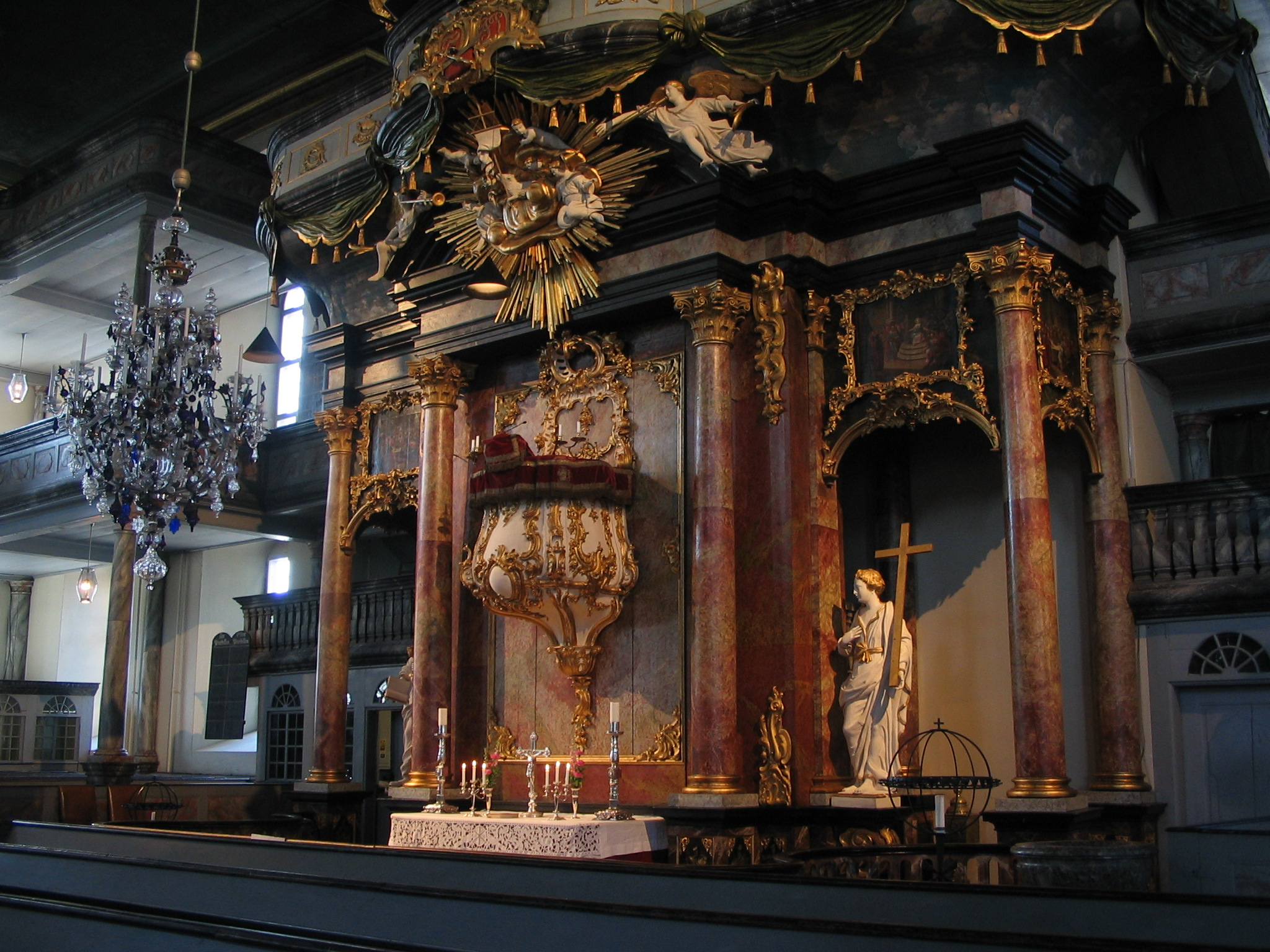
Altar

== See also ==
- List of churches in Tunsberg
