= 1713 in Norway =

- Centuries: 16th; 17th; 18th; 19th; 20th
- Decades: 1690s; 1700s; 1710s; 1720s; 1730s
- See also: 1713 in Denmark; List of years in Norway

Events in the year 1713 in Norway.

== Incumbents ==
- Monarch: Frederick IV.

== Events ==
- 19 September - Frederik Krag is appointed Vice Steward of Norway.
- Selbo Copper Works (later incorporated into Meraker Brug) was established.

== Births ==
- Johan Henrik Freithoff, violinist and composer (died in 1767).

== Deaths ==
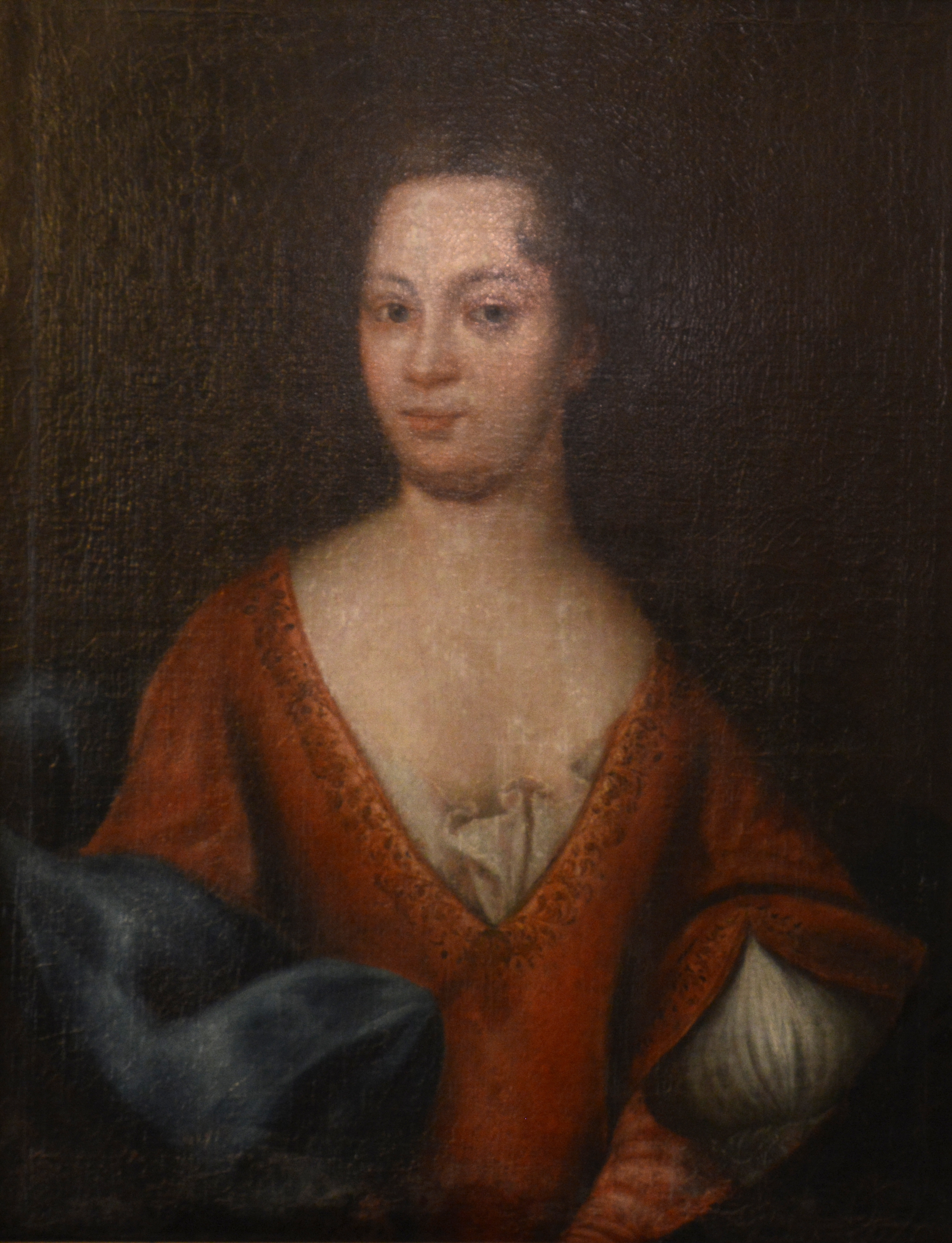
Anne Clausdatter

- 11 April – Anne Clausdatter, businesswoman and owner of Borgestad Manor in Skien (born 1659)
