= Christian Andreas Irgens =

Norwegian businessman and politician

Christian Andreas Irgens (6 July 1833 - 15 April 1915) was a Norwegian businessman and Member of parliament.

== Biography ==
He was born in Bergen, Norway as the son of Johan Daniel Stub Irgens and Susanne Cathrine Møller. Through his father he was a distant relative of Jens Stub who was a member of the Norwegian Constitutional Assembly at Eidsvoll in 1814.

Irgens was a member of the Bergen City Council. At that time he worked as a businessman operating the Bjørsvik Flour Mill (Bjørsvigs Melforretning) on Osterfjorden outside Bergen. He had been a deputy representative in 1874–1878 and was elected to the Norwegian Parliament in 1895, representing the rural constituency Søndre Bergenhus Amt (today named Hordaland).

Irgens married twice; Marcel Ingeborg Marie Wesenberg (1836-1866), Sally Camilla Jahnsen (1846-1913). He died during 1915 in the Fjøsanger area of Bergen.
