= Mathias Hagerup =

Norwegian politician

Mathias Hagerup (1765–1822) was a Norwegian director general in Stockholm 1814–1822, and acting state secretary to the Council of State Division in Stockholm and acting councillor of state in 1822.
