= Jonas Greger Walnum =

Norwegian politician

Jonas Greger Walnum (20 August 1771 – 10 March 1838) was a Norwegian property owner and politician.

Walnum was born in Steigen in Nordland, Norway. He was the son of Ole Henriksen Walnum (1740-1773) and Else Marie Greger (1746-1812). He inherited property known as Walnumgodset from his father. He resided in the town of Sandnessjøen on the island of Alsta where he was an innkeeper and trader.

He married Else Maria Meyer Hersleb (1771-1838), widow of Tøger Pedersen Bech. She was the oldest sister of theologian Svend Borchmann Hersleb. In 1801, Walnum acquired the estate of his father-in-law, Jørgen Sverdrup Hersleb, and settled as proprietary of Nord-Herøy, the largest island in Herøy Municipality. He and his wife were the parents of fifteen children, including two sons who became priests with the Church of Norway. Their eldest son, Jørgen Olaus Hersleb Walnum (1799-1888), became the local chaplain and later took over the family estate on Nord-Herøy.

Jonas Walnum was elected to the Norwegian Parliament in 1824, representing the constituency of Nordland. He served only one term.
