= Jens Johan Vangensten =

Norwegian farmer and politician (1766–1837)

Jens Johan Vangensten (6 September 1766 - 8 February 1837) was a Norwegian farmer and politician.

He was born at Fet in Akershus, Norway. He operated a farm in Sørum and died in Christiania (now Oslo).

Vangensten was elected to the Norwegian Parliament in 1815, representing the constituency of Akershus Amt. He served only one term.
