= Hans Olsen Hafsrød =

Norwegian politician

Hans Olsen Hafsrød (15 August 1783 – 23 May 1835) was a Norwegian politician.

He was elected to the Norwegian Parliament in 1833, representing the constituency of Jarlsberg og Laurviks Amt. He worked as a farmer there. He only served one term.
