= Hans Friis =

Norwegian priest and poet (1716–1762)

Hans Friis (1716 – 12 November 1762) was a Norwegian priest and poet.

He was born in Trondheim, a son of Mathias Friis and Elen Opdal. Friis grew up in a merchant family and received his early education at the Trondheim Cathedral School. He took his theological degree from the University of Copenhagen in 1740. He was engaged as staff chaplain under the parish priest at Aukra Church in Romsdalen. In 1753, he married the priest's daughter Ingeborg Munthe Lund (1728–1776). When his father-in-law died two years later, Friis took the office of vicar which he held until his own death in 1762.

From his adolescence in Trondheim, he had become familiar with the Seminarium Lapponicum, a school for the education of missionaries and teachers to serve in the Sami settlement. He is known for his cycle of poems, De norske Findlappers Beskrivelse which was first published in Copenhagen in 1740. These provide a description of the way of life of the Sami people in Trøndelag and Nordland.
