= Lars Jakobson Thingnæsset =

Norwegian farmer and politician

Lars Jakobson Thingnæsset (1760–1829) was a Norwegian farmer and politician.

He worked as a farmer at Notenes in Førde Municipality. He was a representative to the Norwegian Parliament during the term 1815–1816, in 1818 and in 1824. He died in a drowning accident at Kinn Municipality.
