= 1716 in Norway =

- Centuries: 17th; 18th; 19th; 20th
- Decades: 1690s; 1700s; 1710s; 1720s; 1730s
- See also: 1716 in Denmark; List of years in Norway

Events in the year 1716 in Norway.

== Incumbents ==
- Monarch: Frederick IV.

== Events ==
- Great Northern War:
  - 8 March - King Charles XII of Sweden leads an invasion of Norway, crossing the border at Basmo, near the modern-day town of Marker.
  - 9 March - Battle of Høland.
  - April - The forces of Charles XII of Sweden briefly occupy Christiania.
  - 23–26 May - Battle of Sponvika.
  - 4 July - Fredrikshald is set on fire by its inhabitants as to prevent the city being taken by the forces of King Charles XII.
  - 8 July - Battle of Dynekilen.
- 24 February - Peter Jansen Wessel was ennobled, and given the noble family name Tordenskiold.

== Deaths ==
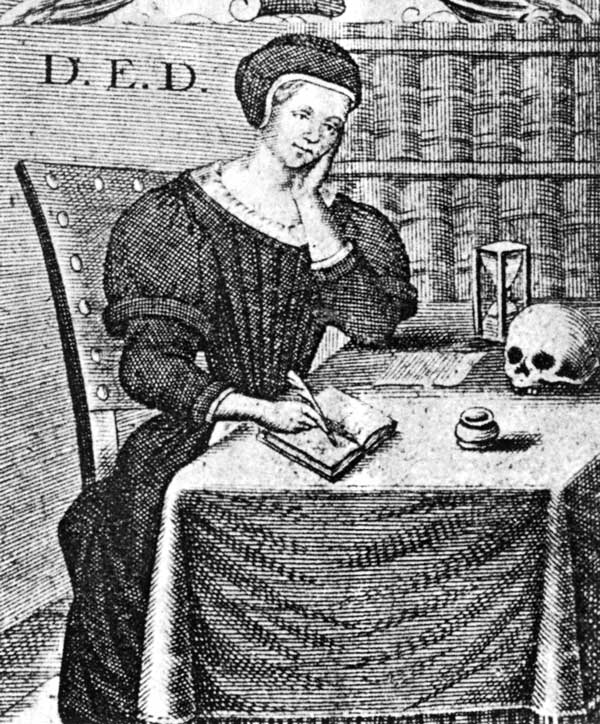
Dorothe Engelbretsdotter

- 19 February – Dorothe Engelbretsdotter, hymn and poem writer (born 1634).

=== Full date missing ===
- Sara Hammond, landowner and businesswoman (born 1672).
