= Anders Trulsson Bruland =

Norwegian civil servant and politician

Anders Trulsson Bruland (1770–1818) was a Norwegian civil servant and politician.

He worked as a farmer at Kvamme farm and bailiff (lensmann) in Førde. He served as a deputy representative to the Norwegian Parliament during the term 1815–1816.
