= Baard Iversen =

Norwegian businessperson and politician

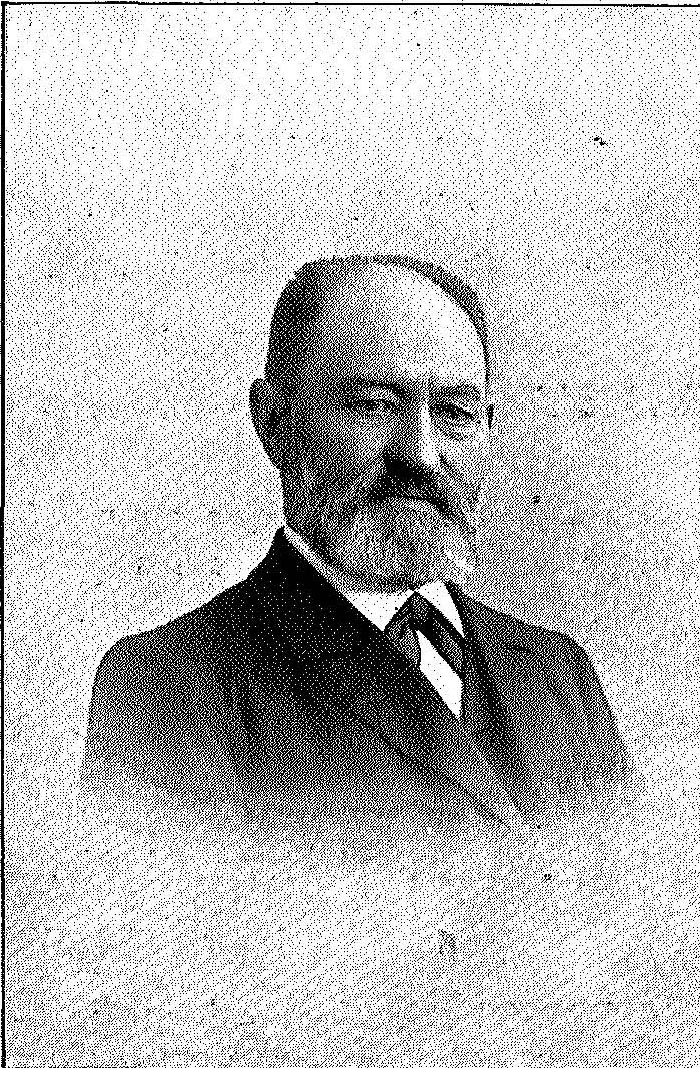
Baard Iversen

Baard Iversen (22 September 1836 – 15 March 1920) was a Norwegian businessperson and politician.

== Biography ==
Iversen was born in 1836 in the parish of Aukra in Romsdalen county, Norway . In 1854, at the age of eighteen he left home for the city Ålesund.

In 1862, he moved to the larger city Trondhjem to establish his own trade agency. He was awarded burghership the same year, and opened his first store B. Iversen. He moved the store to larger premises one year later, and expanded the field of business.

In 1868, Iversen's company entered the shipping business, investing in a freight boat route between Trondhjem and Frederikshald. Iversen later became a ship-owner, his first ship built in 1872 for traffic in the North Sea and the Baltic Sea. In 1890 a route between Trondhjem and Newcastle was established.

Iversen also campaigned for a decent railway connection between Trondhjem and the southern cities. From 1895 he was a member of the working committee of the proposed Dovre Line, which would connect Trondhjem to the capital Oslo via Lillehammer. It finally opened in 1921, one year after Iversen's death. Still, he was nicknamed "the father of the Dovre Line".

Iversen was also involved in local politics and organizational life. He was a member of the executive committee of Trondhjem city council from 1881 to 1892, and chaired several public committees. He represented his city in the Norwegian Parliament as a deputy representative during the term 1892–1894. He co-founded the local chapter of the Conservative Party in 1883. He was also chairman of the Trondheim Commercial Association (Trondhjems Handelsforening) in several periods, and was a member of the Federation of Norwegian Commercial Associations from 1894 to 1900.

== Personal life ==
He was married to Anna Johanne Georgine Junge (1842–1933). His son-in-law Trygve Marstrand Jørgensen became a partner in the company in 1907, and took over in 1915. Baard Iversen died at Trondheim in 1920. He had been proclaimed Knight of the Royal Norwegian Order of St. Olav in 1900 and Commander of the same order in 1910.

His life became the inspiration for the novel Brostein by Toril Brekke (Oslo: Aschehoug. 2003).
