= Drammen Museum of Art and Cultural History =

Art museum in Drammen, Norway

Coordinates: 59°44′21″N 10°11′38″E

- Drammens Museum for kunst og kulturhistorie
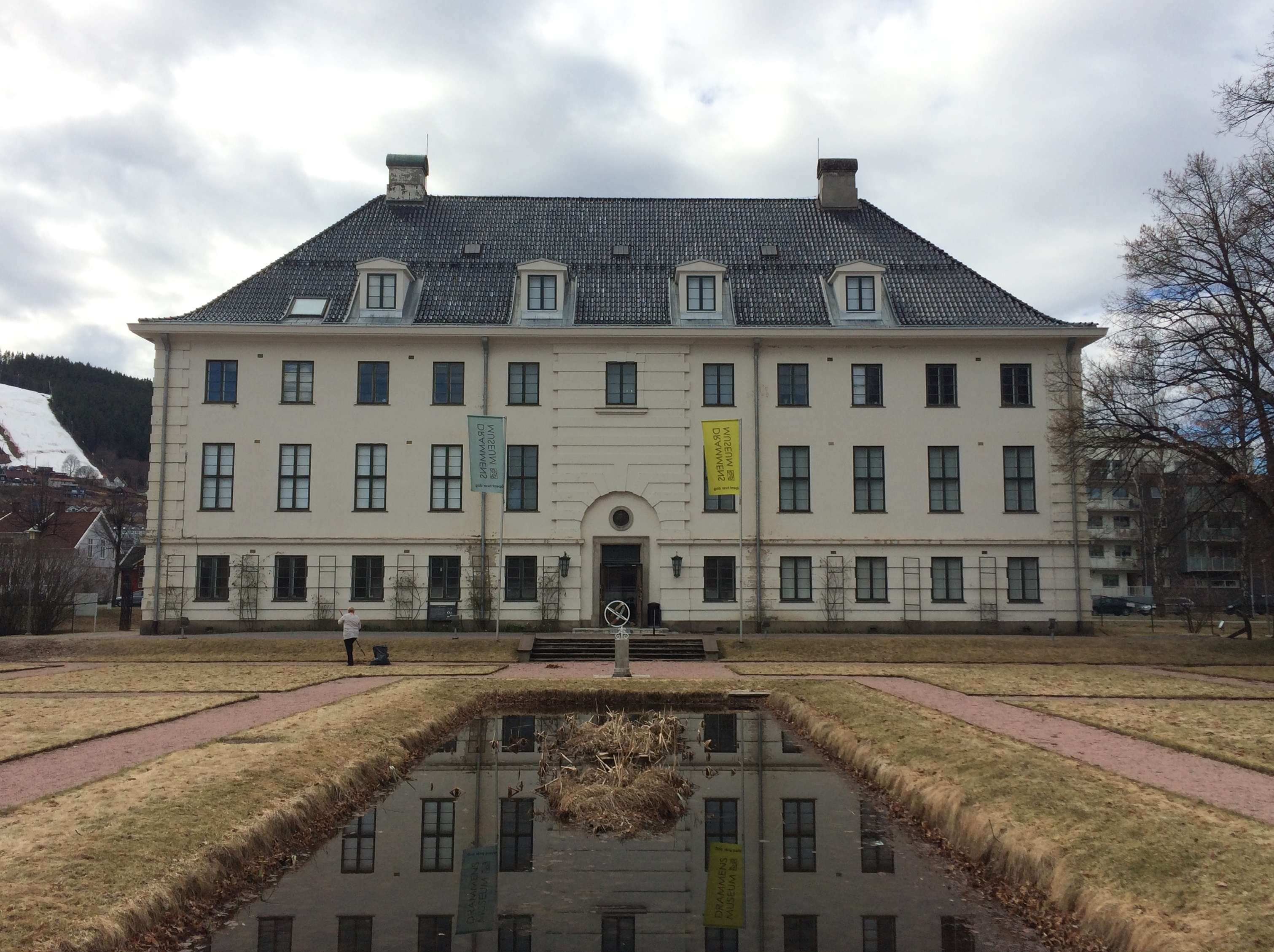
- Location: Drammen, Buskerud, Norway
- Type: Art museum
- Website: www.drammens.museum.no

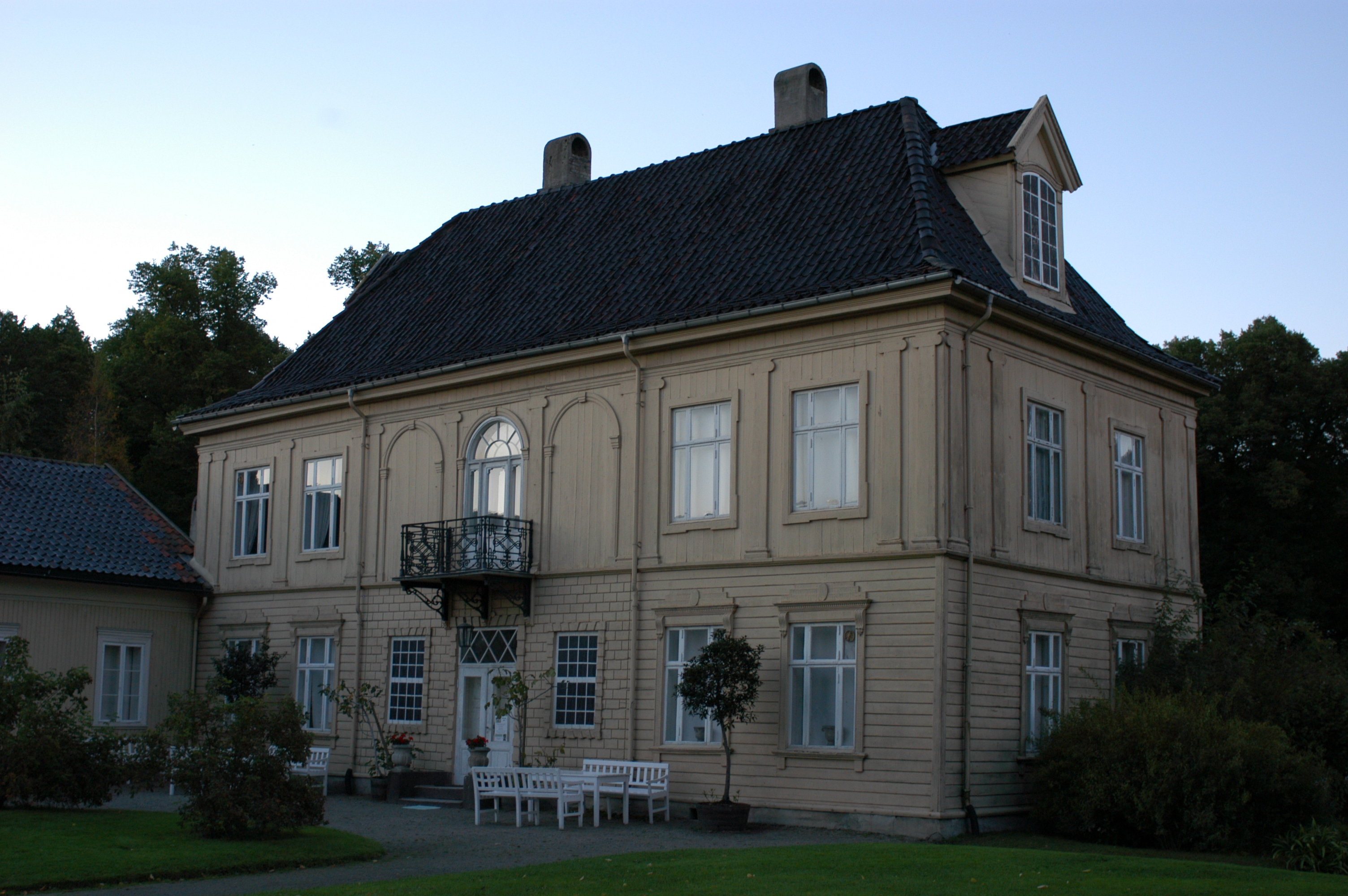
Gulskogen gård

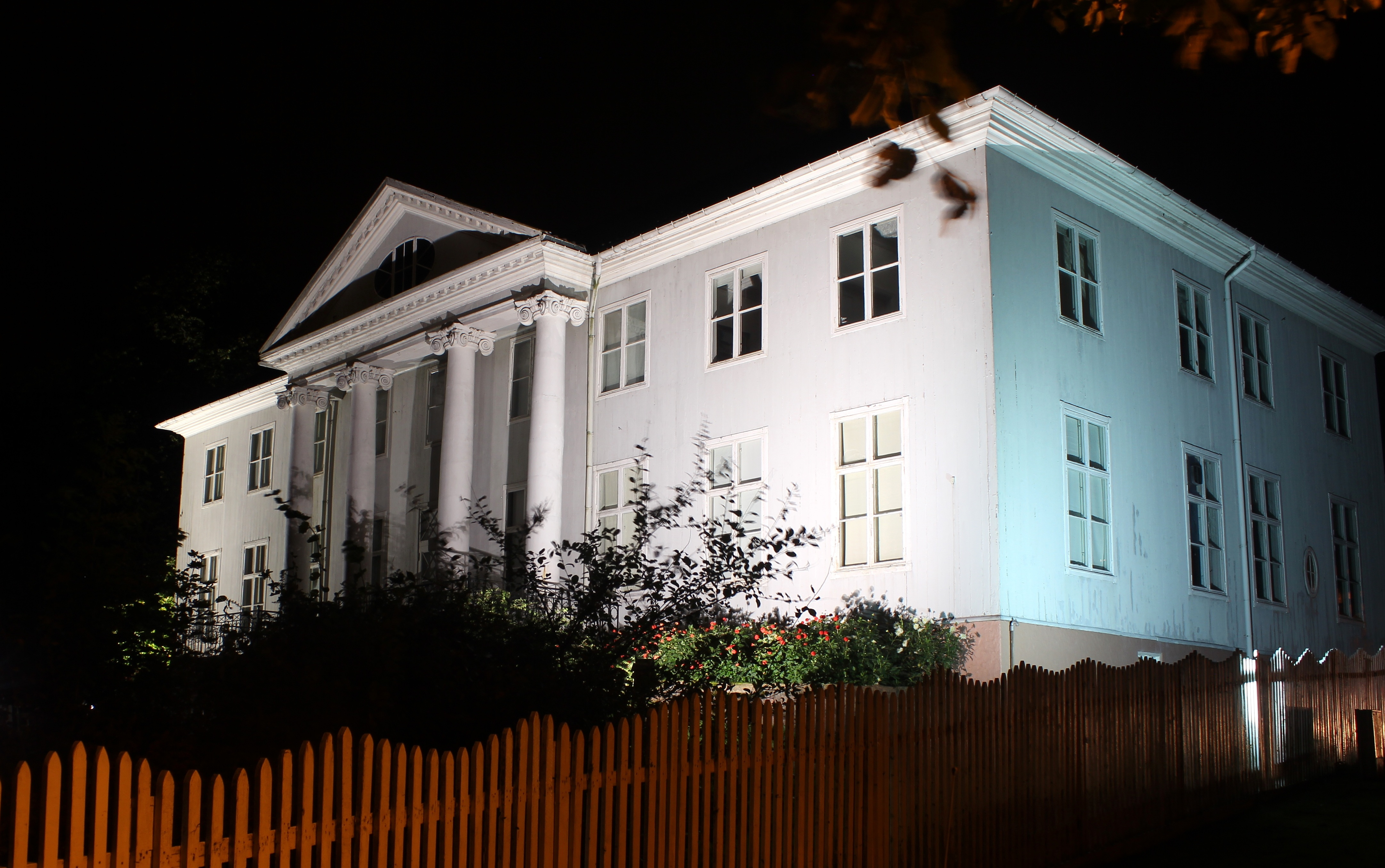
Austad gård

The Drammen Museum of Art and Cultural History (Drammens Museum for kunst og kulturhistorie) is a museum in Drammen in Buskerud, Norway.

== Background ==
The Drammen Museum of Art and Cultural History operates as a foundation created in 1996. The Foundation consists of the former Drammen Museum, founded in 1908, Drammen Art Society, founded in 1867 and Gulskogen Manor, which was established as a museum in 1959. The museum's main buildings are centered on Marienlyst manor (Marienlyst gård) which dates from approximately 1770. Other properties include the a museum building from 1930 containing the museum's administration, permanent exhibitions and collections, as well as Lyche pavilion from 1990 with the gallery, temporary exhibitions and museum café, Halling yard, together with other historic buildings, the oldest of which dating back to 1760s. The museum also includes the two largest preserved farms in Drammen: Gulskogen (Gulskogen gård) and Austad (Austad gård).

== Collection ==
Drammen Museum is located in the center of Drammen, on the southern side of the Drammen River. In years past, this was an area of country homes and manor houses in an area known as Marienlyst. In the main building are the rose-painted wooden chests and cabinets from Hallingdal and Numedal, Norwegian Baroque silver from the 1700s, together with Norwegian and Northern European art glass. The museum's collections come from throughout Buskerud, and covers areas such as folk art and handicrafts, commerce, transport, agriculture, art, costumes and traditional dresses, church art and industry. The museum has a large library, photographic collection and archives covering the history of both Drammen and Buskerud.

Drammen Museum has collected historic houses from around Buskerud and rebuilt them in an area just behind the Spiraltoppen recreation area. Here is the development of a cultural landscape that gives the impression of earlier architectural. In summer, several of the buildings are open to the public. The Fine Art Collection consists primarily of Norwegian art and contains masterpieces from the 1800s. Featured artists include Johan Christian Dahl, Peder Balke, Eilif Peterssen and Theodor Kittelsen.

=== Accessibility ===
Information boards are presented solely in Norwegian. The museum website can be accessed in English.
