= Alexander Møller =

Norwegian politician

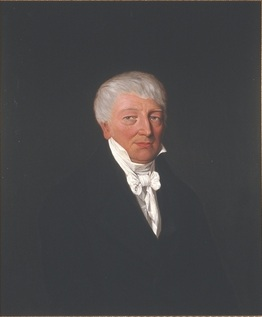
Alexander Christian Møller by Christian Olsen. From DigitaltMuseum

Alexander Møller (24 April 1762 – 28 December 1847) was a Norwegian medical doctor who served at the Norwegian Constituent Assembly in 1814.

Alexander Christian Møller was born in Christiania (now Oslo), Norway. In 1792, he took his medical examination at the University of Copenhagen. He settled the same year as a private doctor in Arendal, where from 1796 to 1835, he was district surgeon in Nedenes amt (now Aust-Agder).

He represented Arendal at the Norwegian Constituent Assembly at Eidsvoll in 1814. He was elected to the Parliament of Norway in 1814. Since he was the only doctor at the Assembly, he was summoned when representatives were sick or injured.
