= Michael Heltzen =

Norwegian mining engineer (1712–1770)

- Portrait of Michael Heltzen by Eric Gustav Tunmarck
- Born: 22 June 1712; Christiania, Norway
- Died: 10 September 1770 (aged 58); Kongsberg, Norway
- Education: University of Copenhagen
- Occupation: Mining engineer

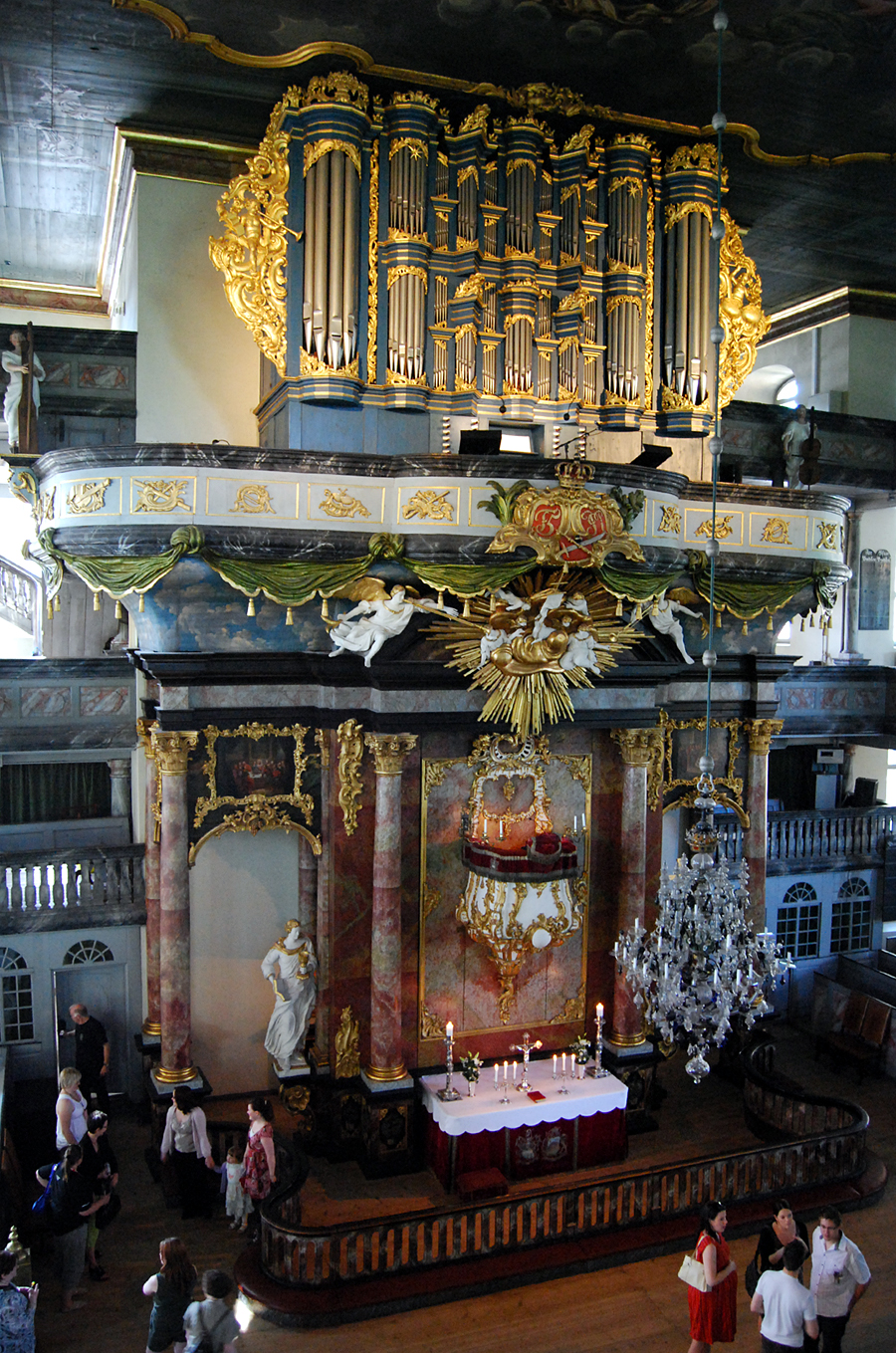
Interior from Kongsberg Church, including the Gloger organ.

Michael Heltzen (22 June 1712 – 10 September 1770) was a Norwegian mining engineer.

== Early life ==
Heltzen was born in Christiania (now Oslo), Norway. He was the son of Helle Michelsen (1674 – 1725) and Sophie Cathrine Paulsdatter Vogt (d. 1723). He studied at the University of Copenhagen.

== Career ==
In 1733, Heltzen went on a several-year study trip in Europe, where he toured German mining operations. He was assigned a position as civil servant (Norwegian: assessor) at Kongsberg from 1740. He served as head of the Kongsberg Silver Mines from 1756, and assumed the position of berghauptmann from 1758, and the position of overberghauptmann from 1764.

Heltzen chaired the committee for the construction of Kongsberg Church. The church was consecrated in 1761. Heltzen was a leading force in the interior decoration and furnishings, which were changed compared to the original plans. The church interior in Rococo style reflects the rock community's hierarchy, with chandeliers from Nøstetangen and Gloger organ as highlights.

In 1757, he was fundamental to the establishment of the Kongsberg School of Mines (Bergseminaret på Kongsberg). An academic institution for mining technology, it was at that time one of Norway's few institution of higher technical and scientific education.
