= Christen Thorn Aamodt =

Norwegian priest

Christen Thorn Aamodt (4 August 1770 – 8 May 1836) was a Norwegian priest.

He was born to a poor family in Kvinesdal in Lister og Mandal county. Enrolled as a theology student in 1789. Despite his background, he enrolled as a student in 1789, and eventually graduated with the cand.theol. degree. He was hired as a curate in Vinje in Telemark in 1798 and Nes in Buskerud during 1803. He then became vicar in Valle in Nedenes county in 1804. In 1810 he was promoted to dean of Raabyggelaget, which corresponded to the rural inland areas of Nedenes including the traditional district of Setesdal.

After five years at Lund in Rogaland from 1814 to 1819, he became dean in Lister, his home district and located in the western part of Agder. He was especially noted for his years in the Setesdal valley, where he worked with improving the local schools, postal system and health. He did so through his profession as well as involvement in the Royal Norwegian Society for Development (Det Kongelige Selskap for Norges Vel), which was established in 1809.
