= Svend Borchmann Hersleb =

Norwegian politician

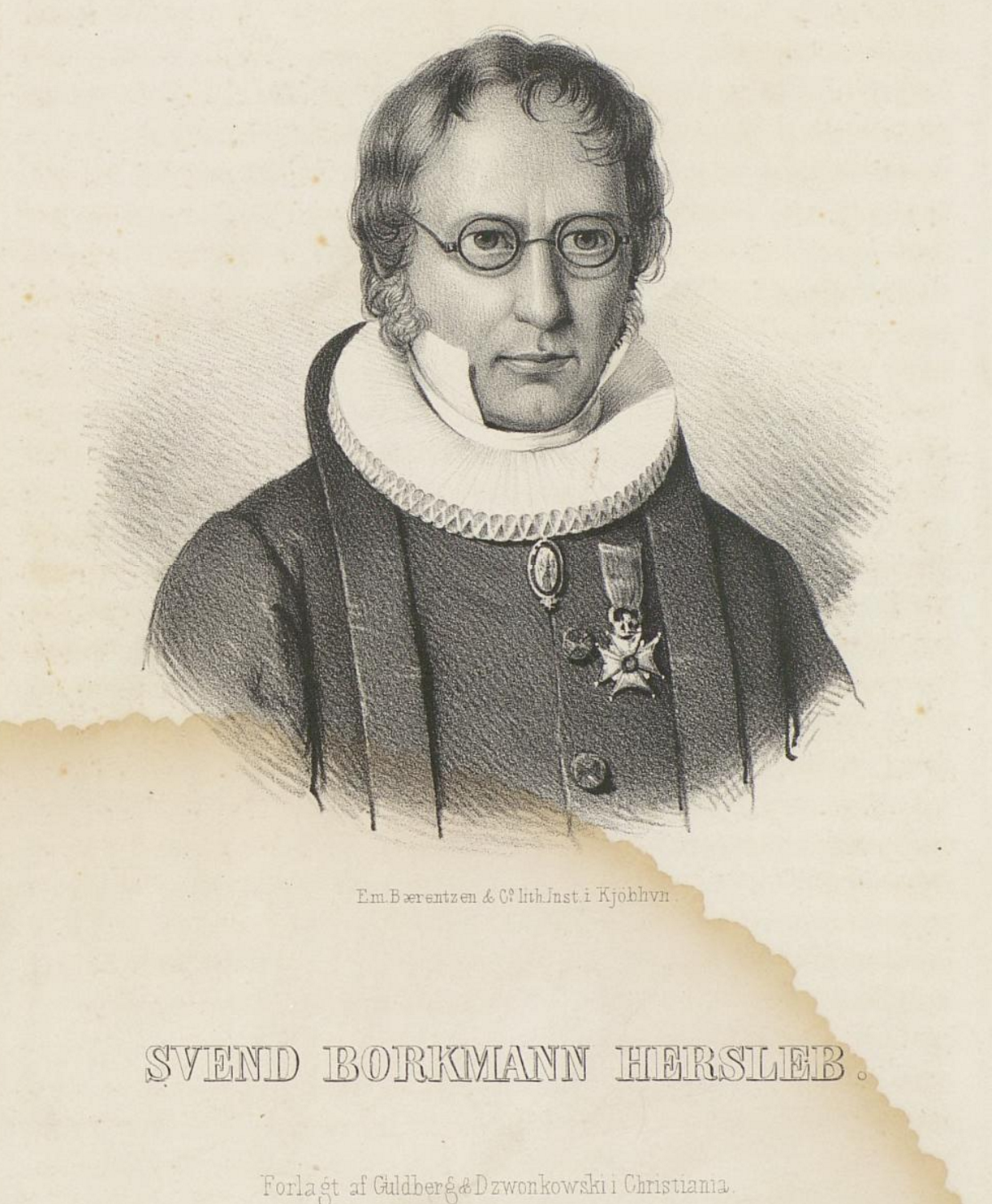
Lithograph of Svend Borchmann Hersleb.

Svend Borchmann Hersleb (7 March 1784 – 12 September 1836) was a Norwegian professor of theology who also served one term in the Norwegian Parliament.

== Personal life ==
He was born in Alstahaug as the youngest son of Jørgen Sverdrup Hersleb and his wife Anna Svendsdatter Borchmann. He had several brothers and sisters. His sister Else married local businessman Jonas Greger Walnum.

== Career ==
Hersleb graduated from the University of Copenhagen as cand.theol. in 1807. He had befriended N. F. S. Grundtvig there, and stayed in Denmark after graduation to work as a teacher at the Metropolitanskolen. Following the foundation of the Royal Frederick University in Christiania in 1811, Hersleb was hired as a lector in 1813. He became the first teacher in theology at the university, and together with Stener Johannes Stenersen, he is credited with founding the Faculty of Theology. Hersleb, who became professor in 1814, and Stenersen were the only academic staff at the faculty until 1832. Hersleb remained professor until his death.

Hersleb, noted as strongly orthodox, was among the founders of the Norwegian Bible Society in 1816. He was also elected to the Norwegian Parliament in 1827, representing the constituency of Christiania. He served only one term.

His friend N. F. S. Grundtvig named his son Svend Hersleb Grundtvig.
