= Hans Jacob Stabel =

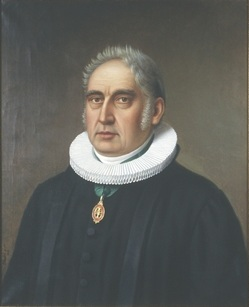
Hans Jacob Stabel

Hans Jacob Stabel (27 August 1769 – 7 January 1836) was a Norwegian priest and elected official.

Hans Stabel was born at the parsonage where his father was parish pastor in Onsøy at Fredrikstad in Østfold county. In 1792, he took a job as personnel chaplain in Onsøy. From 1799, he was an assistant pastor at Slidredomen in Oppland county. In 1806, he became pastor in Søndre Aurdal. He was a vicar in Kristiansand from 1822 to 1825. He served as pastor in Østre Toten from 1825 until he died in 1836.

In 1814, he was a member of the constitutional assembly at Eidsvoll Manor to draft and sign the Norwegian Constitution as a representative from Christians amt, now Innlandet county. He was made a member of the Royal Order of Vasa by King Karl XIV Johan.

== Related Reading ==
- Holme, Jørn, ed. (2014). De kom fra alle kanter - Eidsvollsmennene og deres hus (in Norwegian). Oslo: Cappelen Damm. ISBN 9788202445645.
