= Hedenstad Church =

Church in Buskerud, Norway

- Hedenstad kirke
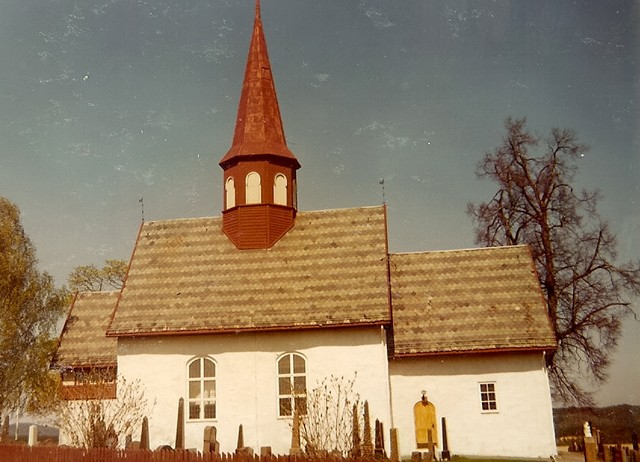
- View of the church
- Hedenstad Church
- 59°36′43″N 9°39′23″E
- Location: Kongsberg Municipality, Buskerud
- Country: Norway
- Denomination: Church of Norway
- Previous denomination: Catholic Church
- Churchmanship: Evangelical Lutheran

History
- Status: Parish church
- Founded: c. 1100
- Consecrated: c. 1100

Architecture
- Functional status: Active
- Architectural type: Long church
- Completed: c. 1100 (926 years ago)

Specifications
- Capacity: 150
- Materials: Stone

Administration
- Diocese: Tunsberg
- Deanery: Kongsberg prosti
- Parish: Hedenestad
- Norwegian Cultural Heritage Site
- Type: Church
- Status: Automatically protected
- ID: 84514

Hedenstad Church (Norwegian: Hedenstad kirke) is a parish church of the Church of Norway in Kongsberg Municipality in Buskerud county, Norway. It is located in the village of Heistadmoen. It is the church for the Hedenstad parish which is part of the Kongsberg prosti (deanery) in the Diocese of Tunsberg. The white, stone church was built in a long church design around the year 1100. The church seats about 150 people.

== History ==
It is a stone long church that was probably built in the early 12th century. Bishop Øystein says in his land register that the church was dedicated to the Archangel Michael and had a feast day on March 3. The ancient stone walls are 1.25–1.5 metres (4 ft 1 in – 4 ft 11 in) thick. The nave is rectangular and the chancel is almost square and somewhat lower and narrower than the nave. The nave has a west portal and two south windows (extended compared to the original), while the chancel has a portal and window to the south and a bricked-up east window (built in 1889, bricked-up 1954). Approximately in the middle of the nave's saddle roof is an octagonal bell tower with a pointed helmet. The gables of the nave and chancel are made of wood and may have always been so. On the north side of the chancel and nave is an extension from 1954 that contains a sacristy.

The church, like most other churches in Norway, was sold into private ownership during the Norwegian church sale in 1723 to help the King pay off war debts. It was in private ownership until 1856, when the municipality took over. In 1889, the church was renovated/restored under the leadership of Herman Backer and received the current wooden church porch. The church was examined by Domenico Erdmann in 1931 and was renovated after World War II according to plans prepared by Thomas Tostrup and with Finn Krafft as consultant.

== Media gallery ==
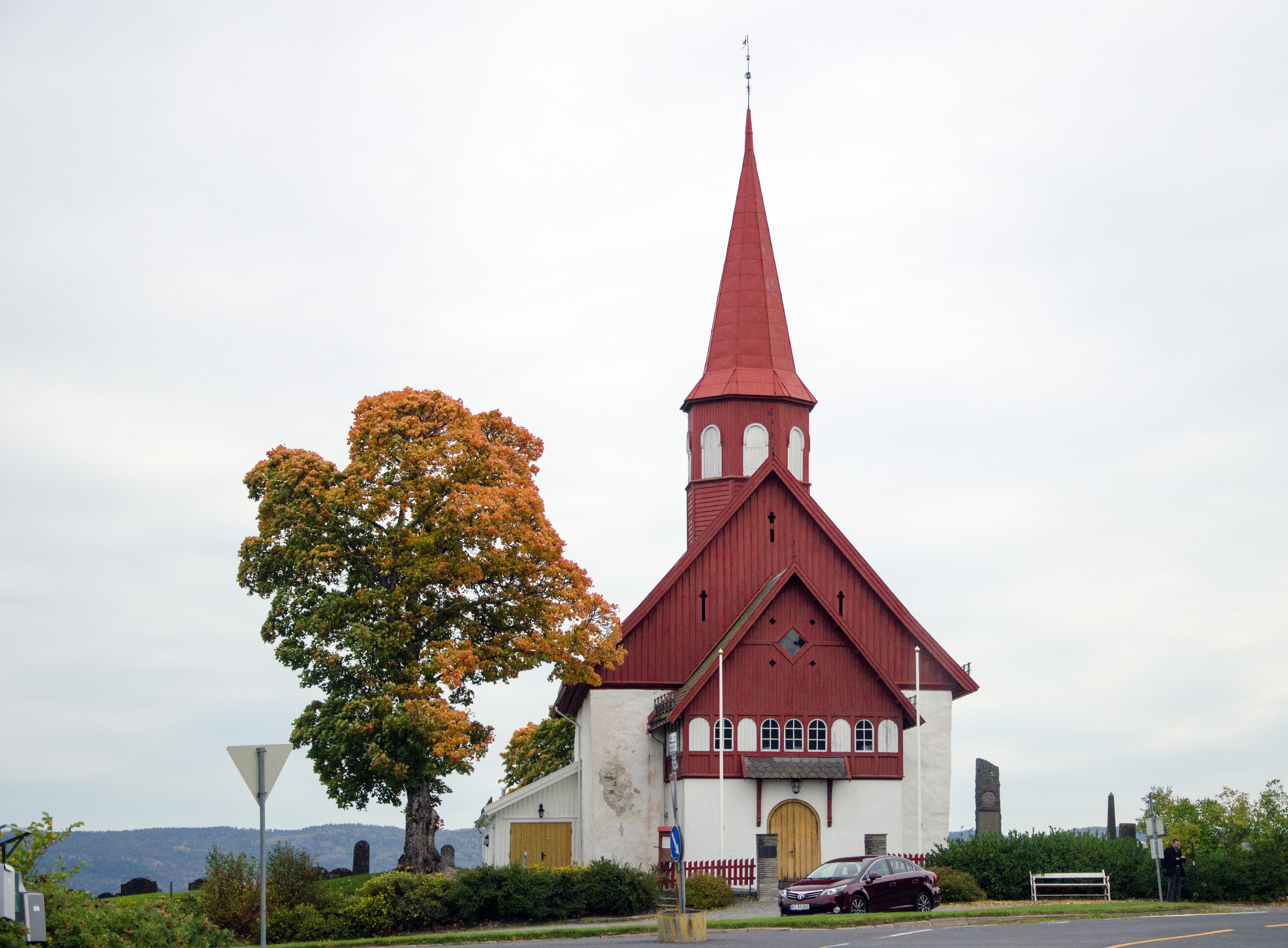

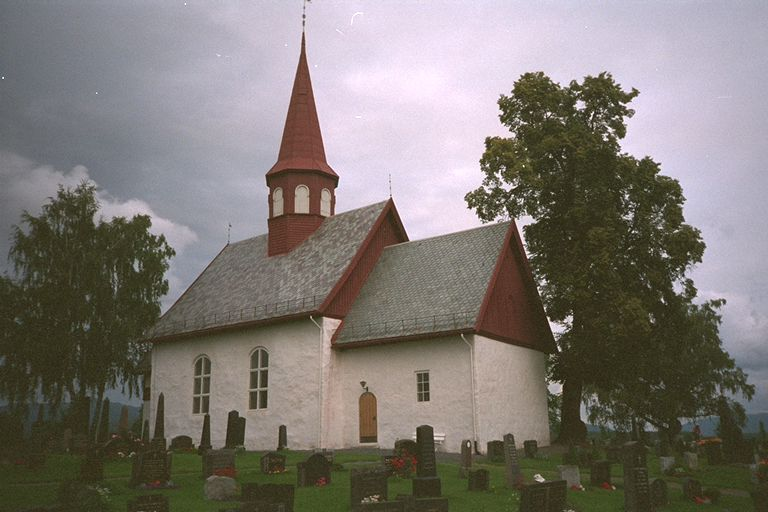

== See also ==
- List of churches in Tunsberg
