= Kongsberg Gloger organ =

Pipe organ

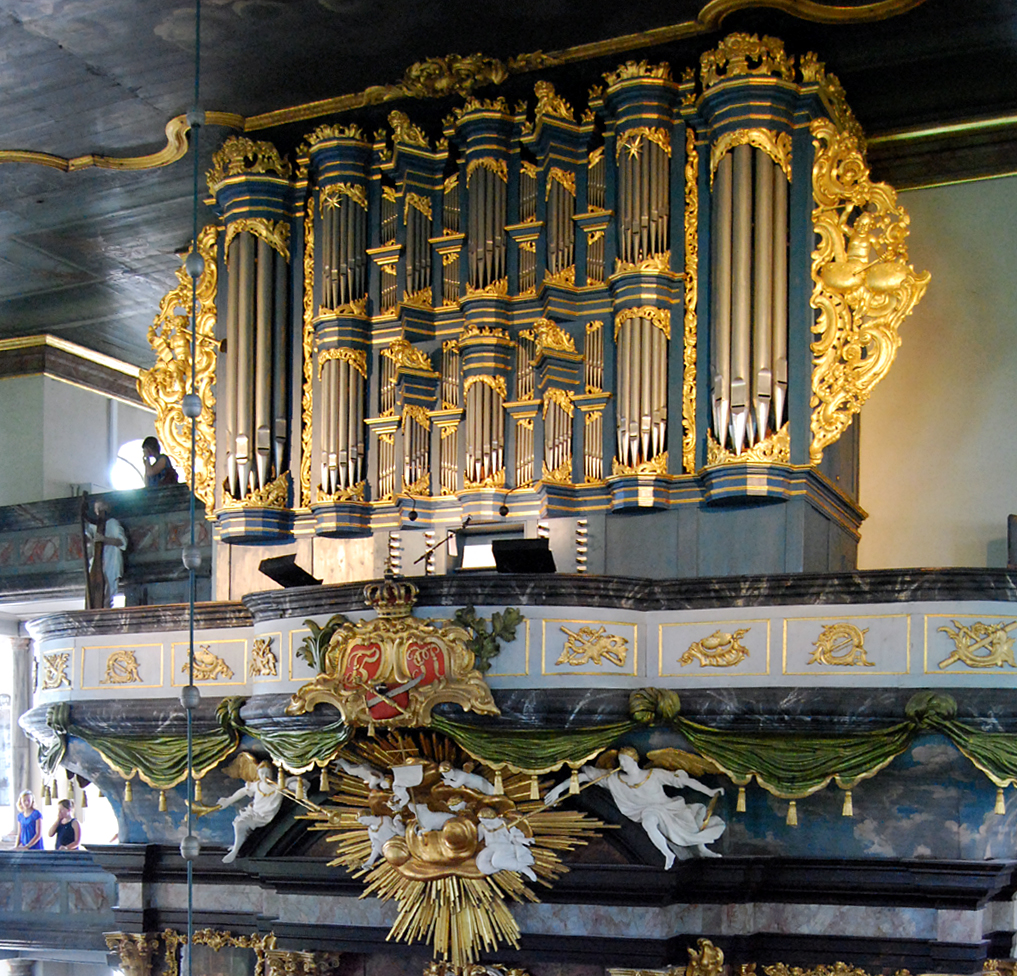
The Gloger organ in Kongsberg Church

The Gloger Organ in Kongsberg Church in Kongsberg, Norway was built by Gottfried Heinrich Gloger in 1765. Because of damage caused by a fire, the organ was disused from the end of the 19th century.

In January 2001, the Gloger organ was restored. The organ builder Jürgen Ahrend had recreated in the restored Gloger pipes the authentic sounds of old. The restoration has given Kongsberg church international status as a concert church.

Since 2001, the organ has given its name to an annual chamber music festival in Kongsberg (Glogerfestspillene), held in January. The organ is also frequently played by visiting international organists, especially during the summer season when the church hosts a series of concerts named "Kongsberg International organ summer".
