= February–August 1814 Norwegian Constituent Assembly election =

Election of delegates to draw up the Norwegian constitution

Constituent Assembly elections were held in Norway in 1814. The elections were held in Christiania and the surrounding area in February, and in the rest of the country as news of the need for elections arrived. However, in the two Northernmost Amts Nordlandene and Finnmarken in the far north of the country, the elections were not held until July and August, by which time the Assembly had finished its work. As political parties were not officially established until 1884, the 112 elected members were independents.

The Constituent Assembly convened at Eidsvoll Manor to draw up the Constitution of Norway. The delegates were popularly dubbed the "Eidsvoll men" (Eidsvollsmennene). The new constitution was agreed on 16 May 1814, and signed and dated the following day. Elections to a second Constituent Assembly were held on 14 August.

== List of members meeting at Eidsvoll on 17 May 1814 ==
=== Akershuus amt (county) ===
- Court chamberlain Peder Anker
- Judge Christian Magnus Falsen
- FarmerKristian Kristensen Kollerud

=== Aggershuske Ridende Jæg. Corps/Akershusiske skarpskytter Regiment (military) ===
- Major Valentin Christian Wilhelm Sibbern
- Lieutenant Colonel Frederik Wilhelm Stabell
- First Sergeant Zacharias Mellebye

=== Arendal (city) ===
- District physician Alexander Christian Møller

=== Artillerie-Corpset (military) ===
- Captain Peter Motzfeldt
- Sergeant Hans Haslum

=== Bergen (city) ===
- Judge Wilhelm Frimann Koren Christie
- Wholesaler Fredrik Meltzer
- Wholesaler Jens Rolfsen
- Resident chaplain Jonas Rein

=== Søndre Bergenhuus Amt (county) ===
- Judge Arnoldus von Westen Sylow Koren
- Parish pastor Georg Burchard Jersin
- Farmer Brynjel Andersen Gjerager

=== Nordre Bergenhuus Amt (county) ===
- Chancery councilmember and judge Lars Johannes Irgens
- Parish pastor Nicolai Nielsen
- Farmer Peder Hjermann

=== Bergenhus Regiment (military) ===
- Captain Ole Elias Holck
- Musketeer Niels Johannesen Loftesnæs

=== Buskerud Amt (county) ===
- Dean Frederik Schmidt
- Bailiff Johan Collett
- Farmer Christopher Borgersen Hoen

=== Bratsberg Amt (county) ===
- Chancellor, District Governor Severin Løvenskiold
- Justice Councilor Peder Jørgen Cloumann
- Farmer Talleiv Olavsson Huvestad

=== Christiania (city) ===
- Professor Georg Sverdrup
- Customs Attorney Christopher Frimann Omsen

=== Christiansand (city) ===
- Assistant Pastor Nicolai Wergeland
- Wholesaler Ole Clausen Mørch

=== Christians Amt (county) ===
- Judge Lauritz Weidemann
- Parish Pastor Hans Jacob Stabel
- Farmer Anders Lysgaard

=== Christiansund (city) ===
- Merchant John Moses

=== Drammen (city) ===
- Manager Nicolai Schejtli

=== Friderichshald (city) ===
- Chancery councilmember, justice of the peace, and judge Carl Adolph Dahl

=== Friedrichsstad (city) ===
- Chancery councilmember and justice of the peace Andreas Michael Heiberg

=== Hedemarkens Amt (county) ===
- District Governor Claus Bendeke
- Judge Andreas Aagaard Kiønig
- Sheriff Ole Olsen Evenstad

=== Holmestrand (city) ===
- Parish pastor Hans Hein Nysom

=== Jarlsberg Grevskab (county) ===
- Count Johan Caspar Herman Wedel-Jarlsberg
- Judge Gustav Peter Blom
- Farmer Ole Rasmussen Apeness

=== Ingenieur Brigaden (military) ===
- Captain Henrik Frederik Arild Sibbern

=== Kongsberg (city) ===
- Mining Master and Supervisor of the Kongsberg Jernverk Poul Steenstrup

=== Kragerø (city) ===
- Justice of the Peace, C.Hersleb Horneman

=== Laurvig (city) ===
- Justice Councilor and Judge Christian Adolph Diriks

=== Laurvigs Grevskab (county) ===
- Landowner Iver Hesselberg
- Ship's captain Anders Hansen Grønneberg
- Farmer Ole Olsen Amundrød

=== Lister Amt (county) ===
- Merchant Gabriel Lund junior
- Sheriff Jens Erichstrup
- Farmer Theis Jacob Thorkildsen Lundegaard

=== Mandals Amt (county) ===
- Farmer Osmund Andersen Lømsland
- Farmer Erich Haagensen Jaabech
- Farmer Syvert Amundsen Eeg

=== Molde (city) ===
- Justice of the Peace Frederik Motzfeldt

=== Moss (city) ===
- Justice of the Peace Gregers Winther Wulfsberg

=== Nedenæs Amt (county) ===
- Owner of an iron works Jacob Aall, Jr.
- Parish Pastor Hans Jacob Grøgaard
- Sheriff Thor Reiersen Lilleholt

=== Nordenfjelske Infanteri Regiment (military) ===
- Captain Peter Blankenborg Prydz
- Musketeer Helge Ellingsen Waagaard

=== Norske Jeger Corps (military) ===
- Captain Palle Rømer Fleischer
- Corporal Niels Fredriksen Dyhren

=== Oplandske Infanterie Regiment (military) ===
- Colonel Diderich Hegermann
- First Sergeant Paul Thorsen Harildstad

=== Porsgrund (city) ===
- Wholesaler Jørgen Aall

=== Raabøigelaugets Amt (county) ===
- Judge Thomas Bryn
- Farmer Even Torkildsen Lande
- Sheriff Ole Knudsen Tvedten

=== Romsdals Amt (county) ===
- County Governor Hilmar Meincke Krohg
- Dean Jens Stub
- Farmer Elling Olsson Walbøe

=== Røraas Bergkorps (military) ===
- Captain Richard Floer

=== Smaalehnenes Amt (county) ===
- Major Valentin Christian Wilhelm Sibbern (who also represented the Norwegian Mounted Jegerkorps).
- Dean Peter Ulrik Magnus Hount
- Farmer John Hansen Sørbrøden

=== Schien (city) ===
- Wholesaler Didrich (von) Cappelen

=== Stavanger (city) ===
- Merchant Peder Valentin Rosenkilde

=== Stavanger Amt (county) ===
- Parish Pastor Lars Andreas Oftedahl
- Merchant Christen Mølbach
- Farmer Asgaut Olsen Regelstad

=== Søe-Deffensionen (military) ===
- Commodore Jens Schow Fabricius
- Lieutenant Thomas Konow
- Midshipman Peder Johnsen
- Able Bodied Seaman Even Thorsen

=== Søndenfieldske Infanterie-Regiment (military) ===
- Colonel Daniel Frederik Petersen
- Musketeer Ole Svendsen Iglerød

=== Søndenfieldske Dragon-Regiment (military) ===
- Captain Eilert Waldemar Preben Ramm
- Corporal Peder Paulsen Balke

=== Tellemarkske Infanterie Regiment (military) ===
- Captain Enevold Steenblock Høyum
- First Sergeant Gullik Madsen Røed

=== Trondhjem (city) ===
- Etatsråd (Councilor of State) Andreas Rogert
- Wholesaler Peter Schmidt, Jr.

=== Søndre Trondhjems Amt (county) ===
- Parish Pastor Jacob Hersleb Darre
- Judge Anders Rambech
- Sexton Lars Larsen Forsæth

=== Nordre Trondhiems Amt (county) ===
- Dean Hans Christian Ulrik Midelfart
- Parish Pastor Hieronymus Heyerdahl
- Farmer Sivert Bratberg

=== Første Trondhjemske Regiment (military) ===
- Captain Georg Ulrich Wasmuth
- Sergeant Daniel Larsen Schevig

=== Andet Trondhjemske Regiment (military) ===
- Captain Jacob Erik Lange
- Sergeant Helmer Andersen Gjedeboe

=== Trondhiemske Dragon Corps (military) ===
- First Lieutenant Frederik Hartvig Johan Heidmann
- Quartermaster Petter Johnsen Ertzgaard

=== Tønsberg (city) ===
- Wholesaler Carl Peter Stoltenberg

=== Westerlenske Inf. Regiment (military) ===
- Major Just Henrik Ely
- Underjeger Omund Bjørnsen Birkeland

=== Østerrisør (city) ===
- Merchant and iron works owner Henrik Carstensen
