= List of members of the Storting, 1821–1823 =

List of all the members of the Storting in the period 1821 to 1823. The list includes all those initially elected to the Storting as well as deputy representatives where available.

== Members from rural constituencies ==
Constituency	Name	Comments/Deputy
Smaalenenes county	Valentin Christian Wilhelm Sibbern	
Smaalenenes county	Thorkild Aschehoug	
Smaalenenes county	Peter Elieson	
Akershus county	Hans Fredrik Grüner	
Akershus county	Anders Halvorsen Haneborg	
Akershus county	Peder Willumsen Juell	
Hedemarkens county	Jacob Pedersen Bolstad	
Hedemarkens county	Jacob Nielsen Hoel	
Hedemarkens county	Ole Olsen Aaset	
Christians county	Østen Paulsen Skaaden	
Christians county	Østen Olsen Ovren	
Christians county	Ole Olsen Ovam	
Buskeruds county	Even Tollefsen Nubberud	
Buskeruds county	Erik Ellingsen Lundesgaarden	
Buskeruds county	Jens Jensen Gram	
Jarlsberg county	Jan Rasmussen Sande	
Jarlsberg county	Hans Hovbrænder	Did not attend due to illness from February 6, 1821, until later in 1822.
Jarlsberg county	Gabriel Smith	Deputy, met for Hovbrænder from February 20, 1821, until Hovbrænder's recovery in 1822.
Laurvig county	Jens Erichstrup	
Bratsberg county	Ole Christophersen Blom	
Bratsberg county	Hans Jacob Gasmann	
Bratsberg county	Henrik Georg Tønder	
Nedenæs and Raabygdelagets county	Jacob Aall	
Nedenæs and Raabygdelagets county	Nils Astrup	
Lister and Mandals county	Søren Gottfried Bøckmann	Did not meet in 1822 due to illness.
Lister and Mandals county	Teis Jacob Torkildsen Lundegaard	
Lister and Mandals county	Ole Olsen Øveland	
Lister and Mandals county	Ole Johnsen Næsset	Deputy, met for Bøckmann in 1822.
Stavanger county	Hans Leierdahl Nansen	Died May 15, 1821. (Note: Following Hans Leierdahl Nansen's death on May 15, 1821, Nansen's deputy Ole Schaveland was summoned by a vote of 38 to 36. Although he met for a time, Schaveland eventually had to step down due to illness. It was decided on July 7 not to call a reserve alternate, as it was thought he would not arrive at the Storting until after it was finished meeting.)
Stavanger county	Nils Trulsen Bru	
Stavanger county	Orm Hansen Øverland	
Stavanger county	Ole Schaveland	Deputy, met for Nansen in 1822.
Søndre Bergenhus county	Johannes Johanesen Spjeldnæs	
Søndre Bergenhus county	Christian Ulrik Kastrup	
Søndre Bergenhus county	Arne Brynildsen Leqve	
Nordre Bergenhus county	Ole Torjersen Svanøe	
Nordre Bergenhus county	Nils Landmark	
Nordre Bergenhus county	Absalon Olsen Wereide	Did not meet in 1822 due to illness.
Nordre Bergenhus county	Hans Arnesen Urdahl	Deputy, met for Wereide in 1822.
Romsdals county	Andreas Landmark	
Romsdals county	Peder Ludvig Munthe Bull	Did not meet in 1821 due to a pending court case nor in 1822 due to illness. (Note: As Peder Ludvig Munthe Bull did not meet in 1821 and 1822, it was decided that his vote was suspended. Bull's deputy, Peder Tonning, met in his stead.)
Romsdals county	Ole Carl Olsen Frøsøie	
Romsdals county	Peder Tonning	Deputy, met for Bull in 1821 and 1822.
Søndre Trondhjems county	Christian Krohg	
Søndre Trondhjems county	Abraham Dreyer Mosling	
Søndre Trondhjems county	Jens Jensen Lodgaarden	
Nordre Trondhjems county	Ole Olsen Lunke	
Nordre Trondhjems county	Anders Bertelsen Aasved	
Nordre Trondhjems county	Frederik Hartvig Johan Heidmann	
Nordlands county	Johan Ernst Berg	Did not meet in 1822 due to illness.
Nordlands county	Jens Aars	
Nordlands county	Ole Ivar Evjenth	
Nordlands county	Arnoldus Schytte	Deputy, met for Berg in 1822.
Finmarkens county	Peter Vogelius Deinboll	
Finmarkens county	Jan Roland Nilsen	
Finmarkens county	Nicolai Olsen Normann	

== Members from urban constituencies ==
Constituency	Name	Comments/Deputy
Frederikshald	Carsten Tank	
Frederiksstad	Andreas Martin Seip	
Moss	Momme Peterson	
Christiania	Jørgen Young	
Christiania	Andreas Arntzen	
Christiania	Marcus Pløen	
Christiania	Even Bernhardt Stenersen	
Drammen	Pierre Poumeau Flor	
Drammen	Elling Mathias Holst	
Kongsberg	Hans Wølner Kofoed	Did not meet in 1821 due to illness.
Kongsberg	August Christian Baumann	Deputy, met for Kofoed in 1821.
Tønsberg and Holmestrand	Christen Grønnerup	
Larvik and Sandefjord	Nils Brinck Bendz	
Skien and Porsgrunn	Jens Hansen Blom	
Kragerø and Øster-Risør	Joachim Paycken	
Arendal	Peter Didrik Stilling Steen Herlofsen	
Christianssand	Toruf Foss	
Christianssand	Wincents Lassen Sebbelow	
Stavanger	Peder Valentin Rosenkilde	
Bergen	Christian Magnus Falsen	
Bergen	Fredrik Meltzer	
Bergen	Johan Ludwig Mowinckel	
Bergen	Georg Jacob Bull	
Christianssund and Molde	Ingelbrecht Knudssøn	
Trondhjem	Lorentz Johannsen	
Trondhjem	Carl Valentin Falsen	Elected at the Lagting on March 10, 1821
Trondhjem	Jacob Frederik Oxholm	
Trondhjem	Johan Mølmann Lysholm	Did not meet in 1822.
Trondhjem	Jacob Roll	Deputy, met for Lysholm in 1822.

== Sources ==
- Lindstøl, Tallak (1914). Parliament and Council: 1814-1914. The individual parliament and councils 1814-1885 (in Norwegian). Kristiania: Steen'ske bandtrykkeri.
- Norwegian Social Science Data Service
