= Hieronymus Heyerdahl =

Hieronymus Heyerdahl may refer to:

- Hieronymus Heyerdahl (1773–1847)
- Hieronymus Heyerdahl (1867–1959)
