= Jacob Lange =

Jacob Lange may refer to:

- Jacob Otto Lange (1833–1902), Norwegian politician
- Jacob Erik Lange (1767–1825), Norwegian military officer and politician
