= Bratberg =

Bratberg is a surname. Notable people with the surname include:

- Ragnhild Bratberg (born 1961), Norwegian orienteering competitor and cross country skier
- Sivert Bratberg (1780–1816), Norwegian farmer and teacher
- Terje Bratberg (born 1955), Norwegian historian and encyclopedist
