= Wasmuth =

Wasmuth is a Germanic surname. It may refer to:

== People ==
- Georg Ulrich Wasmuth (1788–1814), Norwegian military officer and politician
- Henry Wasmuth (c. 1840 – 1865), U.S. Marine during the American Civil War

== Other ==
- USS Wasmuth (DD-338), U.S. warship named for Henry Wasmuth (see above)
- Wasmuth Portfolio, German architectural volumes published by Ernst Wasmuth in 1910, about the works of Frank Lloyd Wright

== See also ==
- Wassmuth, a surname
