= Hjermann =

Hjermann is a Norwegian surname. Notable people with the surname include:

- Peder Hjermann (1754–1834), Norwegian farmer and politician
- Per Severin Hjermann (1891–1972), Norwegian politician
- Reidar Hjermann (born 1969), Norwegian psychologist
