= Peder Johnsen =

Norwegian sailor

Peder Johnsen (baptised 30 November 1783 – 10 June 1836) was a Norwegian sailor who served as a representative at the Norwegian Constituent Assembly in 1814.

Peder Johnsen was born at Tvedestrand in Nedenes, Norway. He was the youngest of ten siblings. Johnsen served as a commissioner officer in the Royal Norwegian Navy. He was an accountant at the Kristiansand shipyard in Lister og Mandal, before he was assigned as a midshipman. In later years, he was the captain of the bark De Tvende Brødre.

Peder Johnsen represented The Royal Norwegian Navy (Søe-Deffensionen) at the Norwegian Constituent Assembly together with Jens Schow Fabricius, Thomas Konow, and Even Thorsen. He belonged to the independence party (Selvstendighetspartiet).

In 1810, Peder Johnsen married Catharine Margrethe Nielsdatter (1788-1832). They were the parents of seven children. The family lived on Skippergata street in the central business district of Kvadraturen in Kristiansand.
