= Birkeland =

Birkeland may refer to:

== Places ==
- Birkeland, Agder, the administrative centre of Birkenes municipality in Agder county, Norway
- Birkeland Church, a church in the city of Bergen in Vestland county, Norway
- Birkeland, Vestland, a village in Austevoll municipality in Vestland county, Norway
- Birkeland, another name for Tingvatn, the administrative centre of Hægebostad municipality in Agder county, Norway

== People ==
- Bjarte Birkeland, a Norwegian literary researcher
- Cole Birkeland, American politician
- Eva Birkeland, a Norwegian civil servant
- Halvor Birkeland, a Norwegian sailor
- Kristian Birkeland, Norwegian Explorer and auroral scientist, after which is named:
  - Birkeland current, an electric current found in the aurora and space plasmas
  - Birkeland (lunar crater), a lunar impact crater in the southern hemisphere on the far side of the Moon
- Omund Bjørnsen Birkeland, a Norwegian farmer and politician
- Peter Hersleb Graah Birkeland, a Norwegian bishop
- Rasmus Birkeland, a Norwegian sailor
- Reidar Birkeland, a Norwegian veterinarian
- Thøger Birkeland, a Danish teacher and writer
- Turid Birkeland, a Norwegian politician
