= Erich Haagensen Jaabech =

Norwegian politician (1761–1845)

Erich Haagensen Jaabech (6 December 1761 – 4 January 1845) was a Norwegian farmer who served as a representative at the Norwegian Constitutional Assembly.

Jaabech was born in Usland in the parish of Øyslebø in Lister og Mandal county, Norway. He was the son of Haagen Olson Usland (1721–1773) and Marte Eriksdtr. Skjævesland (1731–1790). In 1788, he married Gunhild Olsdtr. Skjævesland (1763–1844) with whom he had eight children.

He was a farmer who also worked as a teacher in Øyslebø and Holme. In 1806, he bought the farm Jaabekk in Halse parish (Jåbekk gård i Halse ved Mandal) and established residence at that farm. He was also active as a trader, a blacksmith, and a cooper.

He was elected to the Norwegian Constituent Assembly in 1814, representing the constituency of Mandals Amt (now part of Agder county) together with Osmund Andersen Lømsland and Syvert Omundsen Eeg. At the Assembly, all three supported the union party (unionspartiet).
