= Wassmuth =

Wassmuth (German: Waßmuth) is a German surname. Notable people with the surname include:

- Anton Wassmuth (1844–1927), Austrian physicist
- Conny Waßmuth (born 1983), German sprint canoer
- Tabea Waßmuth, German footballer

== See also ==
- Wasmuth (disambiguation)
