= Syvert Omundsen Eeg =

Representative at the Norwegian Constitutional Assembly
- In office 1814–1814
- Constituency: Mandals Amt

Personal details
- Born: August 21, 1757 Søgne, Norway
- Died: November 20, 1838 (aged 81)
- Party: Union Party
- Spouse: Anne Salvesdatter
- Children: 8 (5 survived childhood)
- Occupation: Farmer, sea captain

Syvert Omundsen Eeg (21 August 1757–20 November 1838) was a Norwegian farmer and sea captain. He was a representative in the Norwegian Constitutional Assembly in 1814.

Eeg was born in Søgne in Lister og Mandal county, Norway. He worked as both a farmer and a shipmaster. He signed up as a seaman in Kristiansand in 1796. He sailed aboard the Strandmaagen and the brig Anne Marie. Later, he was the skipper of the galleons Emanuel and Peter. He was held captive in England as a result of the British embargo of Norway during the Napoleonic Wars.

In 1782, Eeg married Anne Salvesdatter (1757-1842). The couple lived on the farm Eeg (Gården Eik in Søgne). They were the parents of eight children, of whom only five survived childhood.

He was elected to the Norwegian Constituent Assembly in 1814, representing the constituency of Mandals Amt (now Vest-Agder). Together with his fellow representatives, Erich Haagensen Jaabech and Osmund Andersen Lømsland, during the negotiations at Eidsvoll, he supported the position of the Union Party (Unionspartiet).

== Related reading ==
- Holme Jørn (2014) De kom fra alle kanter - Eidsvollsmennene og deres hus (Oslo: Cappelen Damm) ISBN 978-82-02-44564-5
