= Lars Andreas Oftedahl =

Norwegian politician

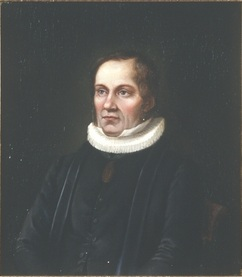
- Born: 19 May 1781; Copenhagen, Denmark
- Died: 17 March 1843 (aged 61); Fiskum, Norway
- Education: University of Copenhagen
- Occupation: priest
- Known for: Member of the Norwegian Constituent Assembly

Lars (Laurentius, Lauritz, Lauriz) Andreas Oftedahl (19 May 1781 – 17 March 1843) was a Norwegian-Danish priest and a member of the Norwegian Constituent Assembly at Eidsvoll Manor that wrote the Constitution of Norway on 17 May 1814.

== Biography ==
Oftedahl was born in Copenhagen, his parents were Lars Larsen Oftedahl, later captain and arms manager, and Ellen Andersdatter (born Evetoft). He moved with his parents to Nyborg, and later to Christianssand, where he graduated as cand.theol. in 1801. From 1809 he was vicar at Rennesøy, Stavanger Amt. He became a renowned speaker, and was elected as one of three delegates from Stavanger Amt to the Eidsvoll Assembly in 1814, where he represented the unionist side. He was first deputy, representing the official class. Along with him from Stavanger Amt came merchant Christen Mølbach and farmer Asgaut Olsen Regelstad.

He served as a curate in Christianssand from 1817, and dean from 1825, and was vicar in Eker from 1831. He served as deputy representative to the Norwegian Parliament for two terms. He was also engaged in social matters such as education and poor relief. He issued a catechism explanation in 1814, and a Latin grammar in 1923.

== Claus Pavels' diaries ==
Oftedahl is mentioned twice in Claus Pavels' diaries. Pavels describes Oftedahl's University speech from 1813 as being "without doubt the most beautiful of them all".

== The catechism explanation ==
Oftedahl's catechism explanation from 1814, Forklaring over Luthers Katekismus, consists of an introductory chapter with 27 questions on religion and moral, followed by five chapters (1. Om Troens Artikle, 2. Om Guds Lov eller de ti bud, 3. Om Bønnen, 4. Om Daabens Sakramente, and 5. Om Alterens Sakramente), containing 223 questions and answers.
