= Paul Thorsen Harildstad =

Norwegian farmer

Paul Thorsen Harildstad (23 December 1764 – 15 January 1843) was a Norwegian farmer who served as a representative at the Norwegian Constitutional Assembly at Eidsvoll Manor in 1814.

== Biography ==
Paul Thorsen (Pål Torsson) was born on the farm Søre Harildstad in the parish of Heidal in Christians amt (county), Norway. He was the seventh of eight children born to a farming family in the Gudbrandsdalen valley. Paul Thorsen was married in 1792 with Rønnaug Larsdotter from the parish of Vaage (now spelled Vågå). The couple lived on the farm Åmodt near the village of Kvam (in what is now Nord-Fron Municipality in Innlandet county) where they raised their family of three sons.

He was commissioned as an officer in 1788 and participated in the campaign against Sweden from 1808–1809. He participated in the Battle of Toverud in Aurskog during 1808 and was awarded the Order of the Dannebrog for bravery. He represented the Oppland Infantry Regiment (Oplandske Infanteriregiment) at the Norwegian Constituent Assembly together with Diderich Hegermann, Commander of the regiment. Both representatives were supporters of the independence party (Selvstendighetspartiet).

== See also ==
- Dano-Swedish War of 1808–09

== Related Reading ==
- Holme Jørn (2014) De kom fra alle kanter - Eidsvollsmennene og deres hus (Oslo: Cappelen Damm) ISBN 978-82-02-44564-5
- Engen, Arnfinn (2012) Gards- og slekthistorie for Heidal (Lillehammer: Bruket forlag) ISBN 978-82-997154-3-0
