= Brynjel Andersen Gjerager =

Norwegian farmer and representative

Brynjel Andersen Gjerager (1761 – 27 January 1838) was a Norwegian farmer who served as a representative at the Norwegian Constitutional Assembly.

Brynjel Andersen Gjerager was born in Voss in Søndre Bergenhus, Norway. In his home village, he served for many years a member of the Settlement Commission (forlikskommissaer) which mediated private disputes. He also held other appointment positions in the parish.

He represented Søndre Bergenhus amt (now Hordaland) at the Norwegian Constituent Assembly at Eidsvoll Manor in 1814. He joined fellow representatives Georg Burchard Jersin and Arnoldus von Westen Sylow Koren. At Eidsvoll Manor, all three representatives supported the position of the independence party (Selvstendighetspartiet).

== Related Reading ==
- Holme Jørn (2014) De kom fra alle kanter - Eidsvollsmennene og deres hus (Oslo: Cappelen Damm) ISBN 978-82-02-44564-5
