= Thor Reiersen Lilleholt =

Norwegian politician

- Born: 3 March 1770; Holt, Norway
- Died: 12 May 1822 (aged 52)
- Occupations: Farmer and district sheriff
- Known for: Representative at the Norwegian Constitutional Assembly in 1814

Thor Reirsen Lilleholt (3 March 1770 –12 May 1822) was a Norwegian farmer and district sheriff who served as a representative at the Norwegian Constitutional Assembly.

Thor Reirsen Lilleholt was born on the Lilleholt farm in Holt parish in Nedenes, Norway. From 1803 to 1817, he served as sheriff in Holt, and from 1803 to 1812, he also held the position in the neighboring parish of Dybvaag. In 1793, he married Asborg Undersdtr (1770–1812), with whom he had five children.

He represented Nedenæs amt (now Aust-Agder) at the Norwegian Constituent Assembly in 1814, alongside Jacob Aall and Hans Jacob Grøgaard. At the Assembly, he supported the union party (unionspartiet).
