= Asgaut Olsen Regelstad =

Norwegian farmer and bailiff

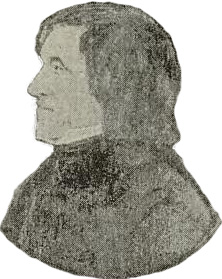
- Born: 1761; Finnøy Municipality, Norway
- Died: 8 January 1847 (aged 85–86)
- Occupations: farmer and bailiff

Asgaut Olsen Regelstad (1761 – 8 January 1847) was a Norwegian farmer and bailiff who served as a representative at the Norwegian Constituent Assembly at Eidsvoll Manor in 1814.

Asgaut Olsen Regelstad was born at the farm Nådå on Finnøy island in Stavanger amt (county), Norway. He was raised on the neighboring Reilstad farm. He was the eldest of four children born to Ole Asgautsen (1764-1773) and Anna Reiersdatter (1736-1775). He was a farmer on Reilstad in Finney. He was also sheriff of Finney from 1816 to 1823. Additionally he was a member of the school commission, served as lay assistant to the parish priest and served as a magistrate judge.

He represented Stavanger amt (now Rogaland) at the Norwegian Constituent Assembly together with Lars Andreas Oftedahl and Christen Mølbach. At Eidsvoll, he was the only farmer at the Assembly from Stavanger. He generally supported the independence party (Selvstendighetspartiet) and approved of a proposal to sell church property.

== Related Reading ==
- Holme Jørn (2014) De kom fra alle kanter - Eidsvollsmennene og deres hus (Oslo: Cappelen Damm) ISBN 978-82-02-44564-5
