= Arnoldus von Westen Sylow Koren =

Norwegian politician

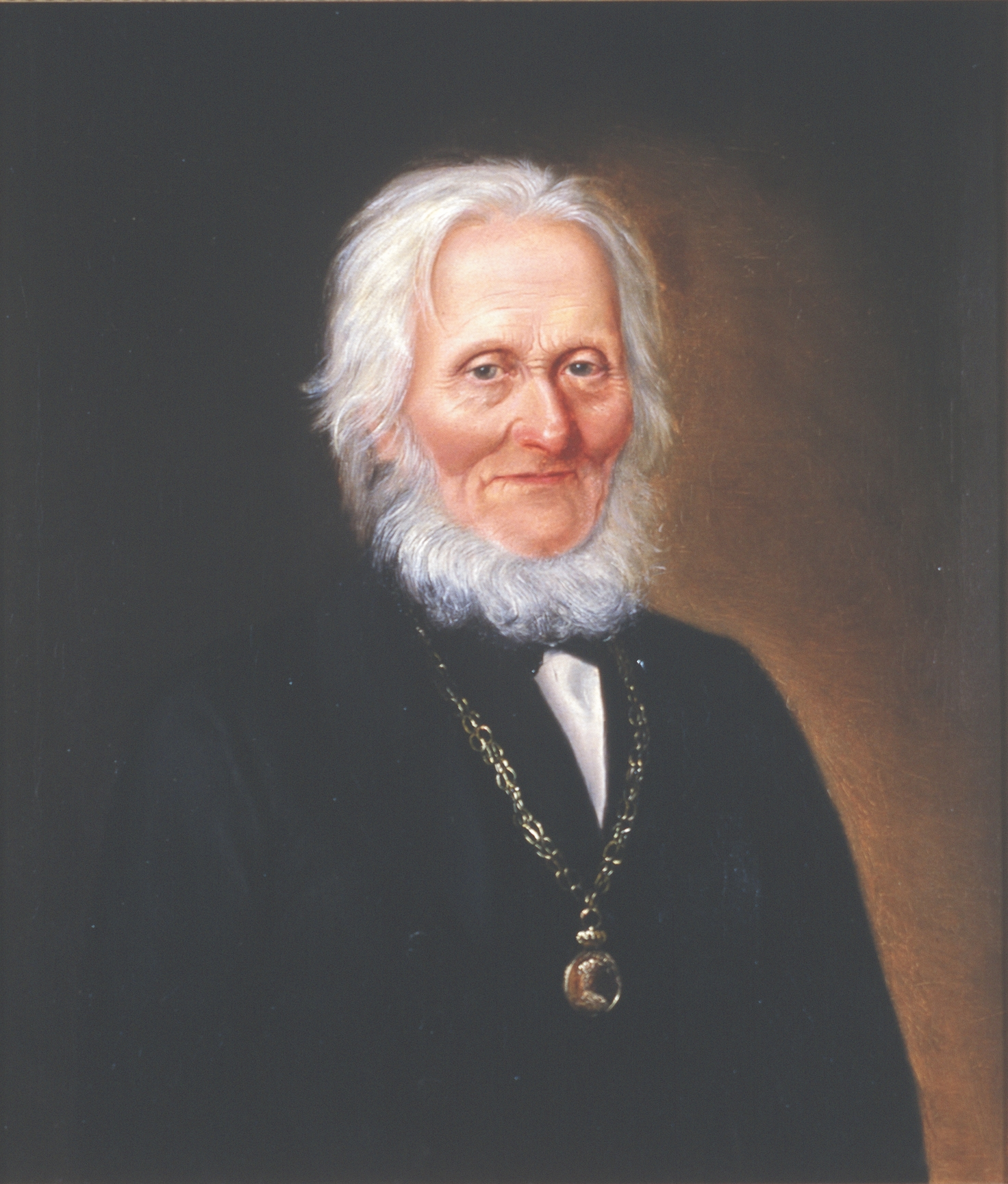
Arnoldus von Westen Sylow Koren, Sorenskriver

Arnoldus von Westen Sylow Koren (22 July 1764 – 8 October 1854) was a civil servant and district judge. He served as a representative at the Norwegian Constitutional Assembly.

== Biography ==
Arnoldus Koren was born in Bergen, Norway. His father Niels Johansen Koren (1718–1784) was a sea captain and later merchant in Bergen. His elder brother was Ulrich Wilhelm Koren (1747–1826) who served as district governor of Stavanger county. He completed Bergen Cathedral School in 1784. He started the divinity school in University of Copenhagen prior to earning his law degree in 1789. Trained as a lawyer, he served as district judge and magistrate (Sorenskriver) in Hardanger and Voss from 1799.

He represented Søndre Bergenhus amt (now part of Vestland) at the Norwegian Constituent Assembly at Eidsvoll Manor in 1814, together with Georg Burchard Jersin and Brynjel Andersen Gjerager. All three were supporters of the independence party (Selvstendighetspartiet). He was elected to the Parliament of Norway in 1814 and in 1818.

He was married in 1796 with his cousin, Magdalene Margrethe Christie (1767–1842). They were the parents of eight children.

Koren supported Free trade.

== Related Reading ==
- Holme Jørn (2014) De kom fra alle kanter - Eidsvollsmennene og deres hus (Oslo: Cappelen Damm) ISBN 978-82-02-44564-5
