= Hieronymus Heyerdahl (1867–1959) =

Norwegian politician

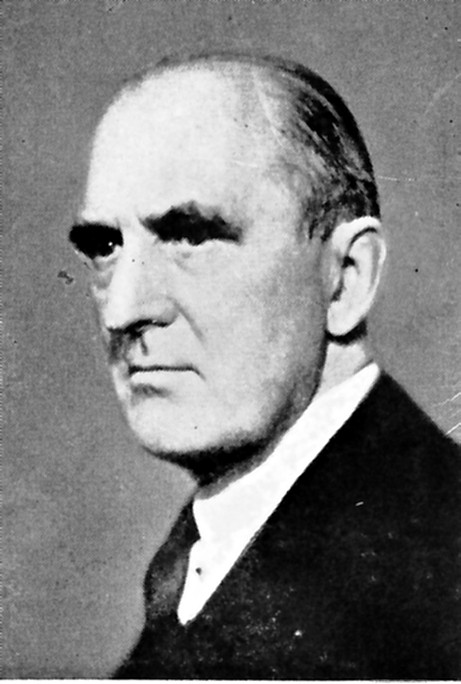
- Born: 5 May 1867; Fredrikstad, Norway
- Died: 13 January 1959 (aged 91)
- Occupations: Lawyer, administrator and politician
- Relatives: Hieronymus Heyerdahl (1773–1847) (grandfather)

Hieronymus Heyerdahl (5 May 1867 – 13 January 1959) was a Norwegian lawyer, administrator and politician for the Conservative Party. He served as mayor of Oslo and was associated with the development of the new Oslo City Hall.

== Personal life ==
Heyerdahl was born at Fredrikstad in Østfold, Norway. His parents were Hieronymus Heyerdahl (1832–1876) and Henriette Sophie Schou (1839-1929). He was the grandson of Hieronymus Heyerdahl (1773–1847) who had served at the Norwegian Constituent Assembly in 1814. He married Anna Wilhelmine Weidemann (1869–1956) in 1893.

== Career ==
Heyerdahl moved to Kristiania (now Oslo) in 1877. He entered the law school at Gjertsens skole in 1884 and earned his cand.jur. in 1889. He opened his own practice as an attorney in 1891 and became a High Court attorney (høyesterettsadvokat) in 1895.

He served on the City Council 1911–19 and 1923–25 and as mayor of Oslo from 1911 to 1914. At the end of his term in office, he developed the plans to build a new Oslo City Hall (Oslo rådhus). Heyerdahl launched the fundraising campaign for a new Oslo City Hall in 1914. Construction started during September 1931 and officially the facility opened in May 1950.

Heyerdahl was chairman of the board of directors of Heimdal A/S, member of the board of directors (chairman 1928–46) of Hafslund, member of the board of Christiania Bank and chairman 1919–29, member of the board of Vinmonopolet and representative of Norway for the Swedish mining company LKAB. He also was president of the Norwegian Red Cross from 1917 to 1922.

Preceded by Lyder Nicolaysen	Mayor of Oslo; 1912–1914	Succeeded by Peter Meinich
