= Petter Johnsen Ertzgaard =

Norwegian farmer, elected official and military officer

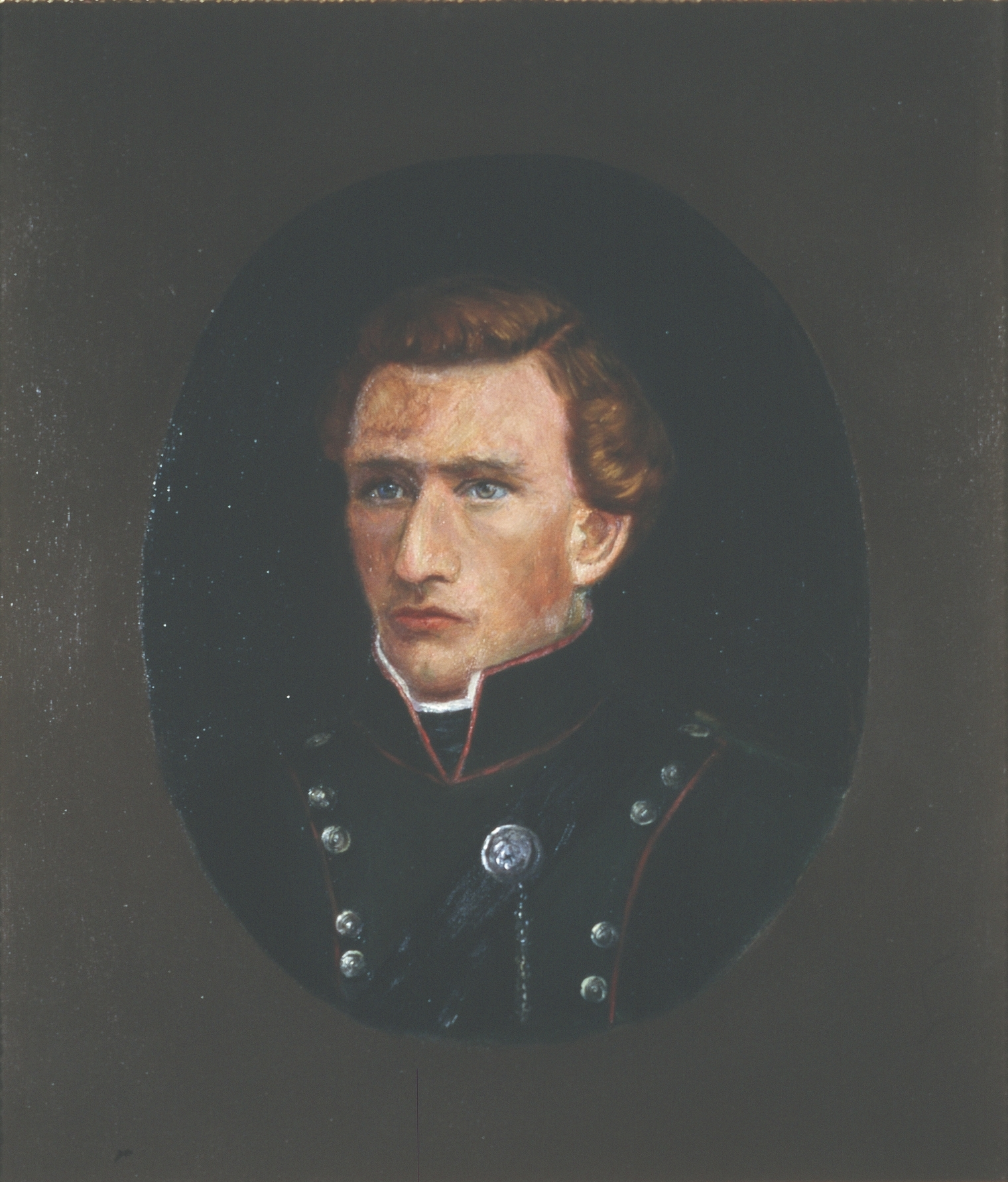
Petter Johnsen Ertzgaard painted by Ragna Hennig-Larsen. The painting belongs to Eidsvoll 1814. From DigitaltMuseum

Petter Johnsen Ertzgaard (13 August 1784 – 7 February 1848) was a Norwegian farmer, elected official and military officer. He served as a representative at the Norwegian Constitutional Assembly at Eidsvoll Manor in 1814.

Petter Johnsen Ertzgaard was born in Stjørdalen in Nordre Trondhjem county, Norway. Ertzgaard served as commissioned officer in Det Strindenske Kompani 1807–1817, and participated during the Jämtland Campaign of 1808. Ertzgaard took over the family farm at Værnes in 1815. He served as a member of the Conciliation Commission (Forlikskommisjon) for his district since 1830 and was deputy chairman from 1838 to 1839.

He represented Trondhjem Dragon Corps (Trondhjems dragonkorps), together with Frederik Hartvig Johan Heidmann at the Norwegian Constituent Assembly at Eidsvoll Manor in 1814. At the Norwegian Constituent Assembly, he supported the position of the union party (Unionspartiet). He was later also a member of the Parliament of Norway in 1830-1835 as a representative from Nordre Trondhjems amt.

== Related Reading ==
- Holme Jørn (2014) De kom fra alle kanter - Eidsvollsmennene og deres hus (Oslo: Cappelen Damm) ISBN 978-82-02-44564-5
