= Lars Johannes Irgens =

Norwegian politician

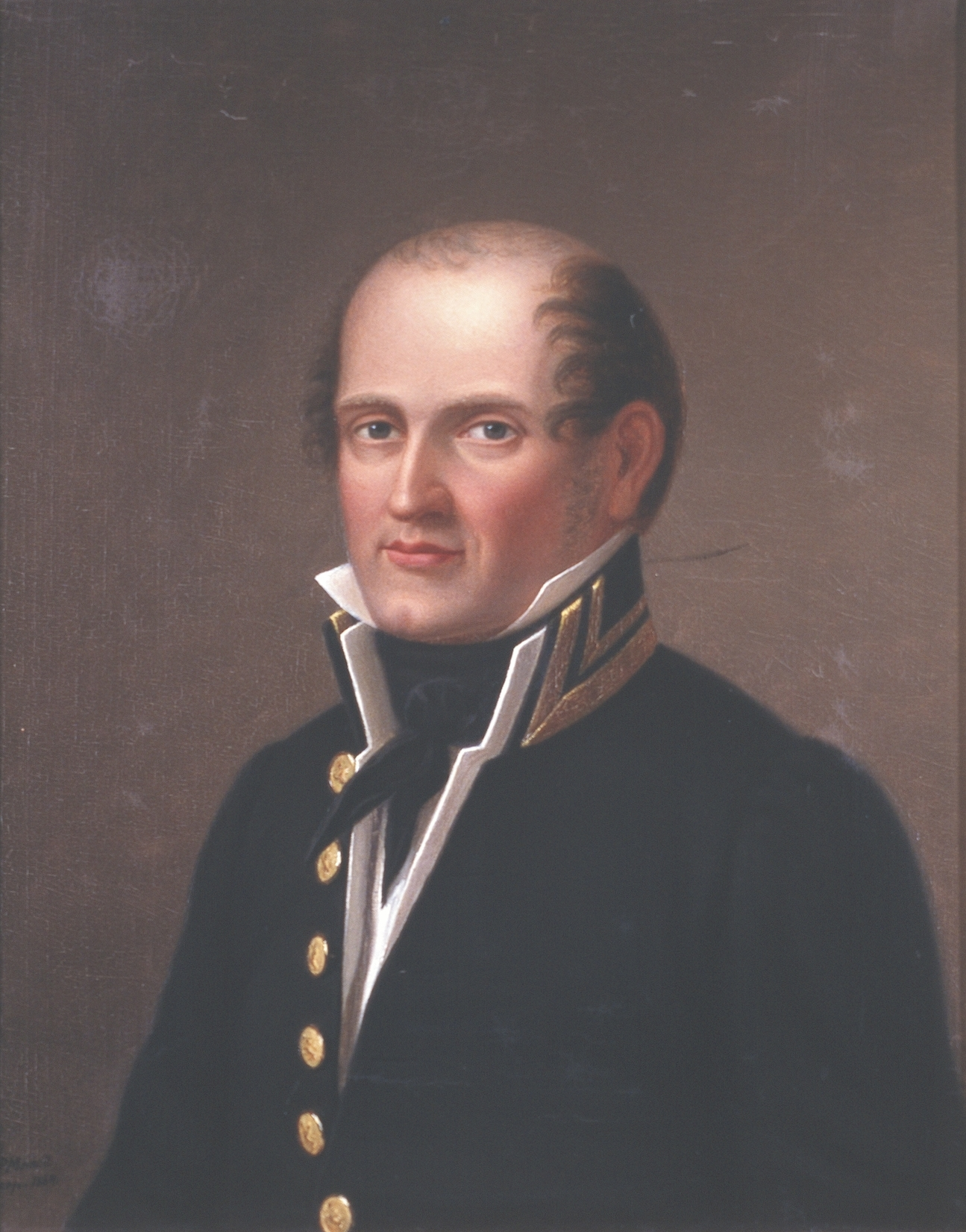
Lars Johannes Irgens

Lars Johannes Irgens (9 October 1775 – 22 April 1830) was a Norwegian jurist and public official. He served as a representative at the Norwegian Constitutional Assembly.

Lars Johannes Irgens was born in the parish of Hof in Solør, Hedmark, Norway. He was the son of the parish priest of Hof. He was married to Christiane Louise Smith (1778-1858) with whom he had eight children including Norwegian government minister Nils Christian Irgens.

He served as a lieutenant in Oppland Dragon Corps (Oplandske Dragonregiment). He graduated as cand.jur. in 1802, and was appointed district stipendiary magistrate (sorenskriver) for Sogn the same year. He held this office until his death. He represented Nordre Bergenhus amt (now part of Vestland county) at the Norwegian Constituent Assembly at Eidsvoll Manor in 1814 together with Peder Hjermann and Niels Nielsen. All three representatives supported the independence party (Selvstendighetspartiet).

== Related Reading ==
- Holme Jørn (2014) De kom fra alle kanter - Eidsvollsmennene og deres hus (Oslo: Cappelen Damm) ISBN 978-82-02-44564-5
