= Richard Floer =

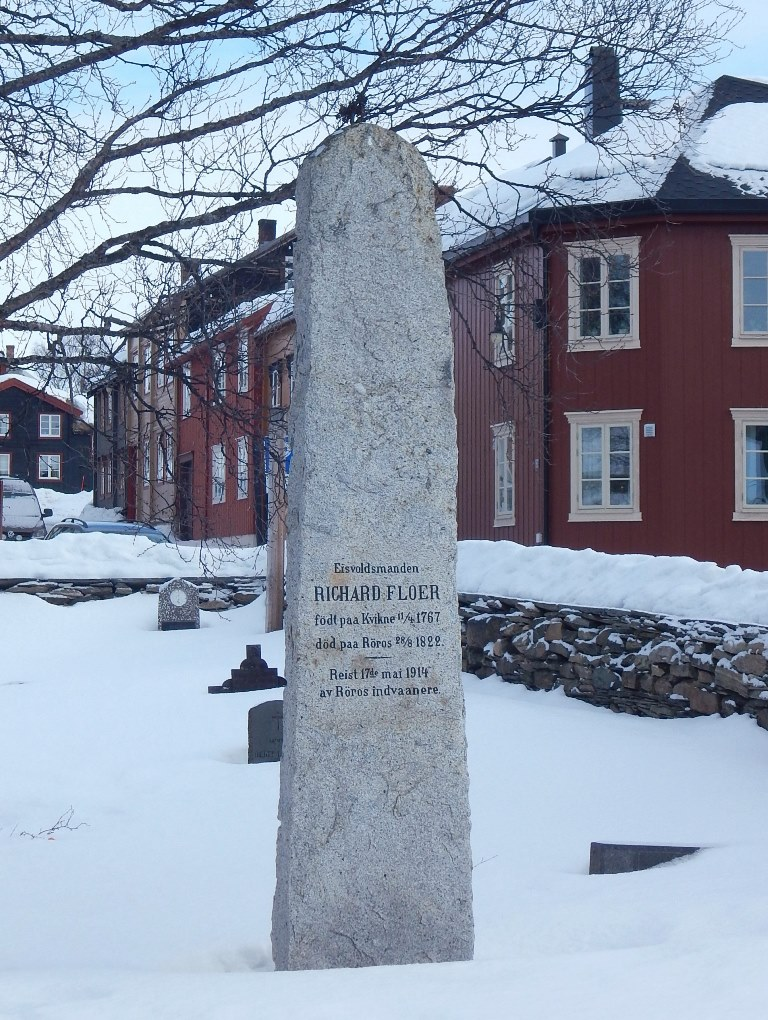
Memorial to Richard Floer at Røros church

Richard Floer (11 April 1767 – 28 August 1822) was a Norwegian politician, mining official and military officer who served as a representative at the Norwegian Constitutional Assembly.

== Early life ==
Richard Henriksen Floer was born on 11 April 1767 in Grindtvedt in the parish of Kvikne in Hedmark county, Norway.

== Career ==
He started his career as a cadet at the Røros Copper Works in Søndre Trondhjem county during 1791. He worked in positions within various departments at the Røros Copper Works, including inspection, housing and communications. He also served as a captain in the Røros Volunteer Mountain Corps (Frivillige Røraasiske Berg-Jægerkorps). Floer was awarded the Order of the Dannebrog for his military services during the war in 1808. He represented the Røros Volunteer Mountain Corps at the Norwegian Constituent Assembly at Eidsvoll Manor in 1814.

== Related Reading ==
- Holme Jørn (2014) De kom fra alle kanter - Eidsvollsmennene og deres hus (Oslo: Cappelen Damm) ISBN 978-82-02-44564-5
