= Ole Olsen Amundrød =

Norwegian farmer and schoolteacher

Norwegian Constitutional Assembly
- In office 1814–1814

Personal details
- Born: 30 May 1771 Tjølling, Norway
- Died: 24 March 1835 (aged 63)
- Spouse(s): Ingeborg Maria Kristoffersdatter (1791–1855) (m.1808)
- Occupation: Farmer and schoolteacher

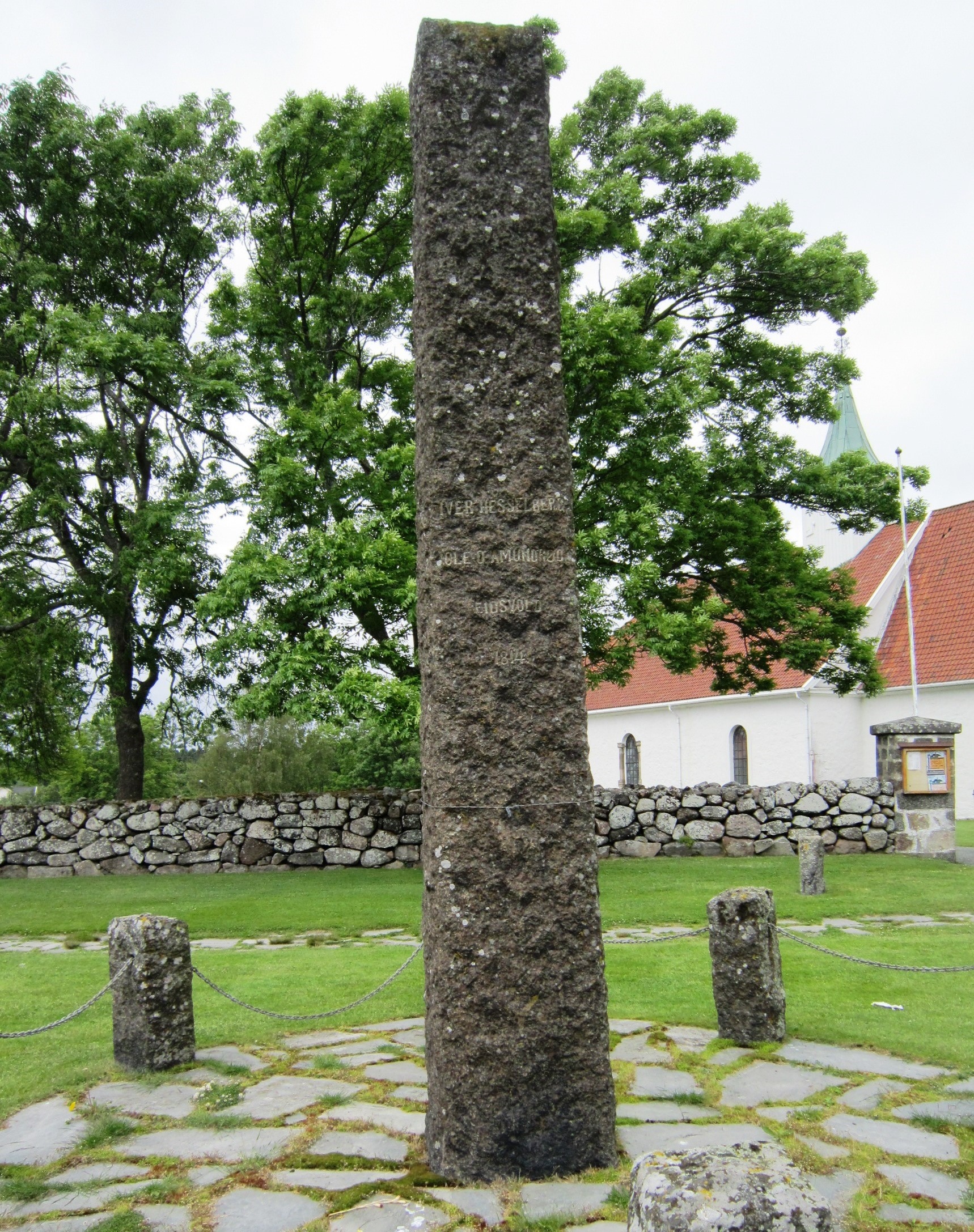
Stone monument commemorating Ole Olsen Amundrød and Iver Hesselberg at Tjølling Church

Ole Olsen Amundrød (30 May 1771 – 24 March 1835) was a Norwegian farmer and schoolteacher. He served as a representative at the Norwegian Constitutional Assembly.

Amundrød was born on the farm Ousby (today Østby Søndre) in the Tjølling prestegjeld in Vestfold, Norway. In 1801 he was appointed schoolmaster, a position he retained until 1810. In 1808, he married Ingeborg Maria Kristoffersdatter (1791-1855). In 1813, the couple took over her family farm, Ommundrød in Tjølling. They also ran an inn on the farm. They were the parents of eight children. After his death, his widow ran the farm until 1842 when she sold it to her son Ole Kristian Olsen and son-in-law Nils Nilsen.

Along with Iver Hesselberg and Anders Hansen Grønneberg, he was elected to represent Laurvigs Grevskab (now Larvik) at the Norwegian Constituent Assembly at Eidsvoll Manor in 1814. All three delegates supported the position of the independence party (Selvstendighetspartiet).
