= Peter Schmidt (Trondheim politician) =

Norwegian merchant and politician

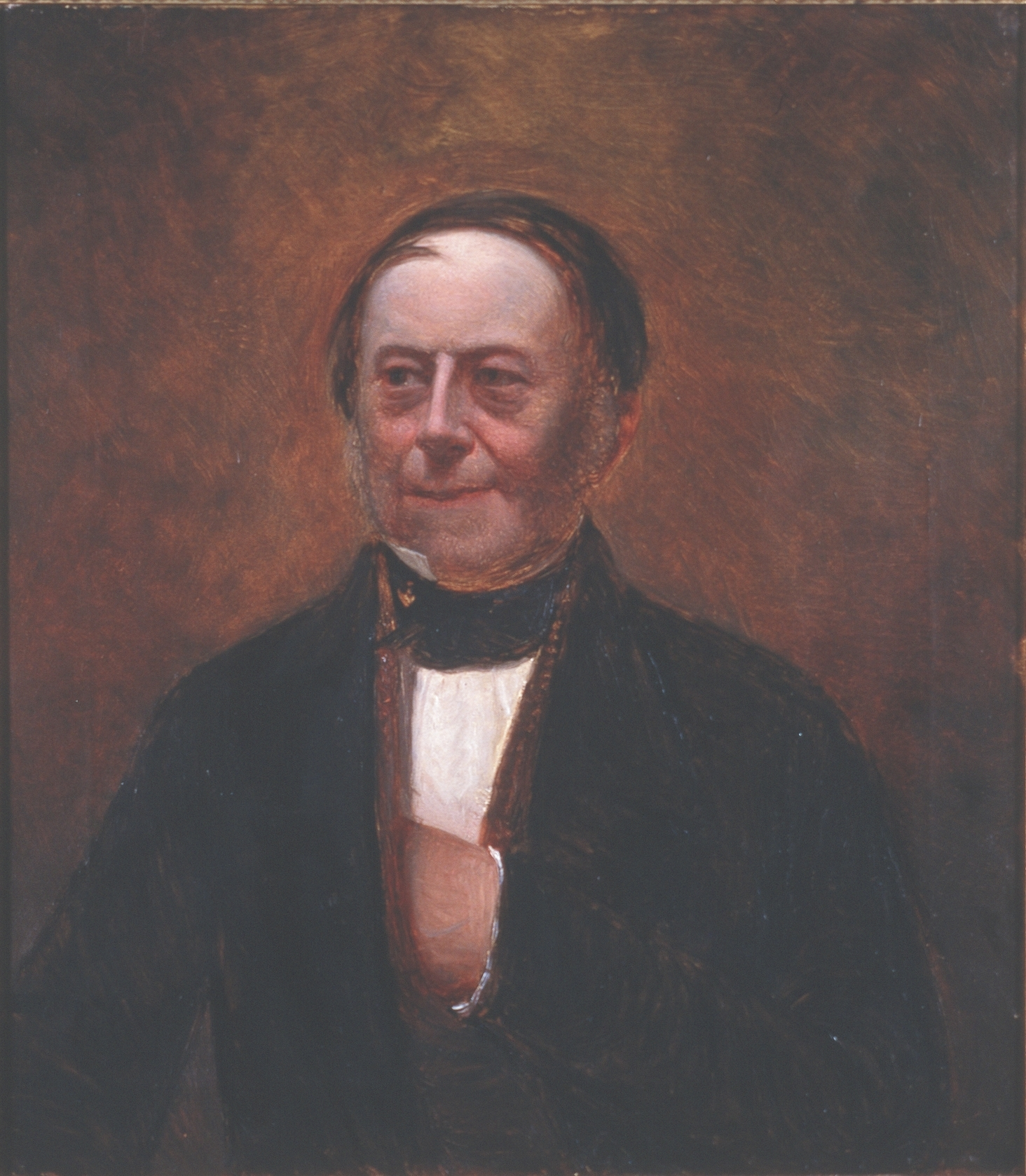
- Born: 12 June 1782; Trondheim, Norway
- Died: 4 March 1845 (aged 62)
- Occupation(s): Merchant and politician
- Known for: Member of the Norwegian Constituent Assembly in 1814

Peter Schmidt (12 June 1782 – 4 March 1845) was a Norwegian merchant and politician.

Peter Schmidt was born in Trondheim, Norway. He was merchant, whose parents had re-located to Trondheim from the trading center and port city of Flensburg in Schleswig-Holstein. He was educated in the trade, and actively participated in the family mercantile business. Schmidt liquidated his business in 1826 and went into public service. He was Public Commissioner of Roads (tukthusinspektør) 1833-1842 and later inspector at the prison.

Peter Schmidt represented the city of Trondhjem at the Norwegian Constituent Assembly in 1814, together with Andreas Rogert. At Eidsvoll, he generally supported the union party (Unionspartiet) .

== Personal life ==
He was the son of merchant Claus Christian Petersen Schmidt (1751- 1831) and Johanne Christine Bech (1754–1840). In 1804, he married Anna Sophie Grundt (1781- 1866). He was the father of a number of children.
