= Just Henrik Ely =

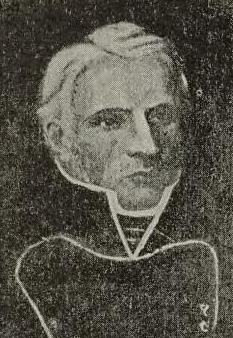
- Born: 30 November 1789; Stavanger, Norway
- Died: 30 March 1824 (aged 34)

Just Henrik Ely (30 November 1759 – 30 March 1824) was a Norwegian military officer who served as a representative at the Norwegian Constitutional Assembly during 1814.

Just Henrik Ely born at Stavanger in Rogaland, Norway. His father was a military officer, and later customs inspector in Tønsberg. In 1776, Just Henrik Ely became Sergeant. In 1782 he became Second Lieutenant.. He was promoted to First Lieutenant in 1786. In 1800. he became Captain of the regiment. In 1811 he was promoted to Major.

He represented Vesterlenske infanteriregiment, together with Omund Bjørnsen Birkeland, at the Norwegian Constituent Assembly at Eidsvoll in 1814.

== Related Reading ==
- Holme Jørn (2014) De kom fra alle kanter - Eidsvollsmennene og deres hus (Oslo: Cappelen Damm) ISBN 978-82-02-44564-5
