= Ole Svanøe =

Norwegian politician

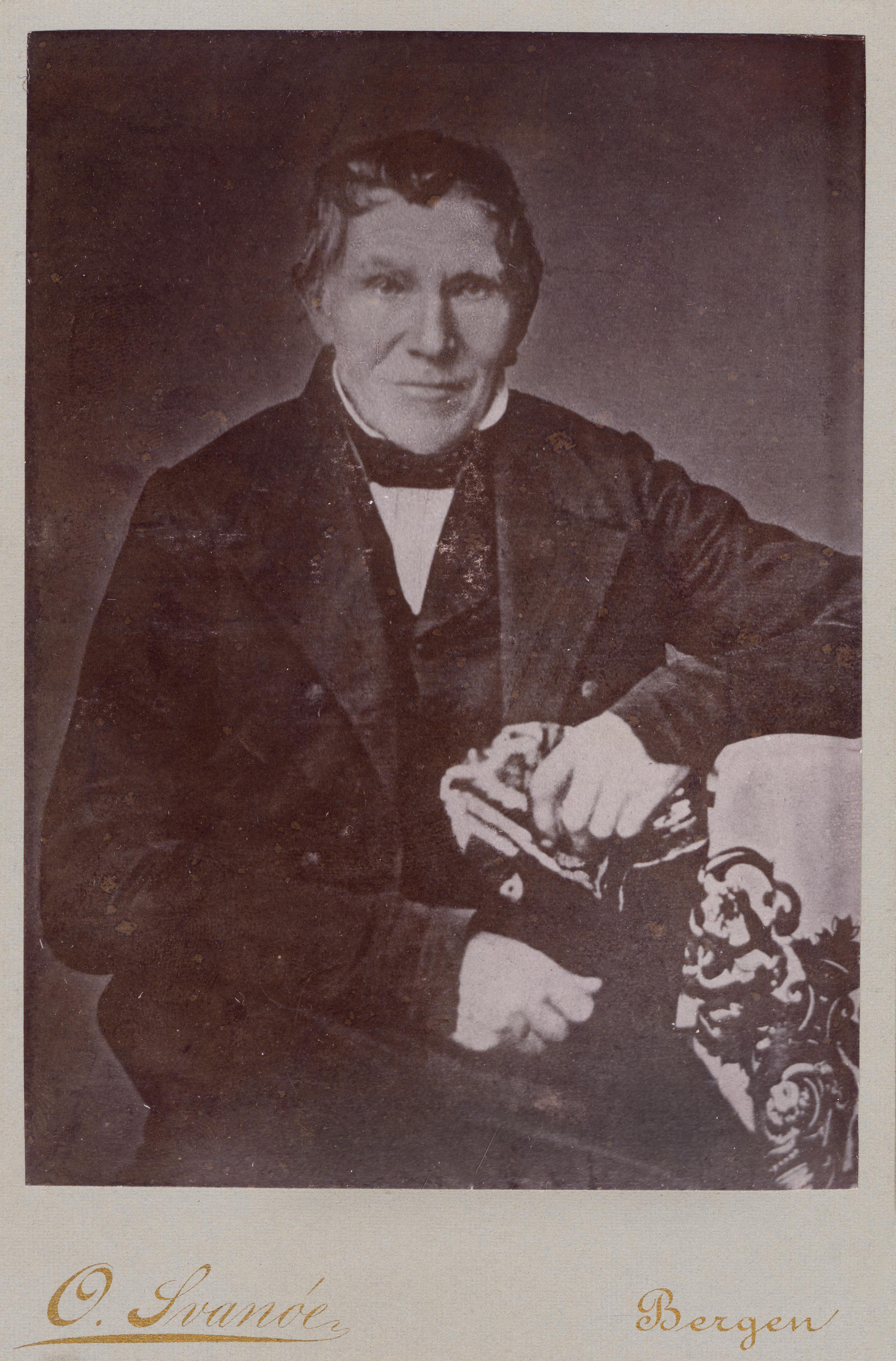
Image of Ole Torjussen Svanøe

Ole Svanøe (28 March 1781 – 29 December 1859) was a Norwegian merchant, farmer, landowner and politician. He served as a member of the Norwegian Parliament.

Ole Torjussen Svanøe grew up on his father's farm Helling at Ål (Helling i Ål) in Buskerud, Norway. He later owned and operated the Svanøy farm (Svanøy gård) which had large forests and sawmills. He also operated a shipyard with fishery and salt works.

Svanøe was a representative to Parliament from Nodre Bergenhus amt (now Sogn og Fjordane) at the first Extraordinary Parliament in 1814. Later he represented the county in Parliament during sessions in 1821–1823, 1824–1826, 1827–1829, 1836–1838, and 1842. He was also a prominent Haugean who in 1801 joined Hans Nielsen Hauge in his journey from Gol to Laerdal. Svanøe made his farm a local focal point in the Haugean movement (haugianere).
