= Peter Elieson =

Norwegian military assessor and politician

John Collett Postumus Elieson (29 December 1770 – 7 June 1833) was a Norwegian military assessor and politician.

He was elected to the Norwegian Parliament in 1821, representing the constituency of Smaalenenes Amt. He only served one term.

He was a grandson of the wealthy merchant Iver Elieson (1683–1753). Through his father's sister he was a nephew of Christian Ancher and a first cousin of Bernt and Peder Anker. His brother Iver Elieson Jr. was a captain.
