= Anders Hansen Grønneberg =

Norwegian Naval officer and farmer

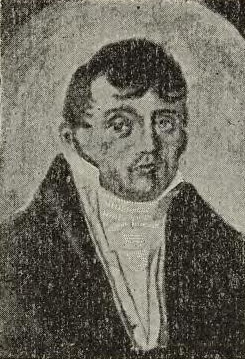
Anders Hansen Grønneberg

Anders Hansen Grønneberg (1779 – 30 October 1819) was a Norwegian Naval officer and farmer who served as a representative at the Norwegian Constituent Assembly in 1814.

Anders Grønneberg was born on Ødelund in the Berg Church parish in the Brunlanes prestegjeld in Vestfold, Norway where his father was district sheriff. In his youth he had stayed with an uncle in London, where he learned to speak English, as well as German and French. As a young man, Grønneberg was a sailor. During the Napoleonic Wars, he was appointed Lieutenant in the Royal Norwegian Navy. Later he settled on the family farm.

He represented Larvik grevskap at the Norwegian Constituent Assembly in 1814, together with Iver Hesselberg and Ole Olsen Amundrød. At Eidsvoll, he joined the independence party (Selvstendighetspartiet), but he was not active in the debates.

== Related Reading ==
- Holme Jørn (2014) De kom fra alle kanter - Eidsvollsmennene og deres hus (Oslo: Cappelen Damm) ISBN 978-82-02-44564-5
