= Sivert Bratberg =

Norwegian farmer and teacher

Norwegian Constitutional Assembly
- In office 1814–1814

Personal details
- Born: 11 June 1780 Steinkjer, Norway
- Died: 27 June 1816 (aged 36)
- Occupation: Farmer and teacher

Sivert Paulsen Bratberg (11 June 1780 – 27 June 1816) was a Norwegian farmer and teacher. He served as a representative at the Norwegian Constitutional Assembly.

Sivert Pålsson Bratberg was born on Bratberg øvre, a farm near the village of Beitstad which is near the town of Steinkjer in Nordre Trondheim county, Norway. He was schooled by his parish priest. Bratberg became a schoolteacher in the village of Dalbygda in the prestegjeld of Leksvik. He later became a farmer on a farm in Velle near his native village. He married Marit Haagensdatter Holte (1777–1834) in 1804. The couple were the parents of two children. He died accidentally at his farm during the summer of 1816 after being kicked by a horse.

Sivert Bratberg represented Nordre Trondhjems amt (now Nord-Trøndelag) at the Norwegian Constituent Assembly in 1814, together with Hans Christian Ulrik Midelfart and Hieronymus Heyerdahl. Here he generally supported the position of the independence party (Selvstendighetspartiet).

== Related Reading ==
- Holme Jørn (2014) De kom fra alle kanter - Eidsvollsmennene og deres hus (Oslo: Cappelen Damm) ISBN 978-82-02-44564-5
