= Andreas Michael Heiberg =

Norwegian jurist and politician (1767–1815)

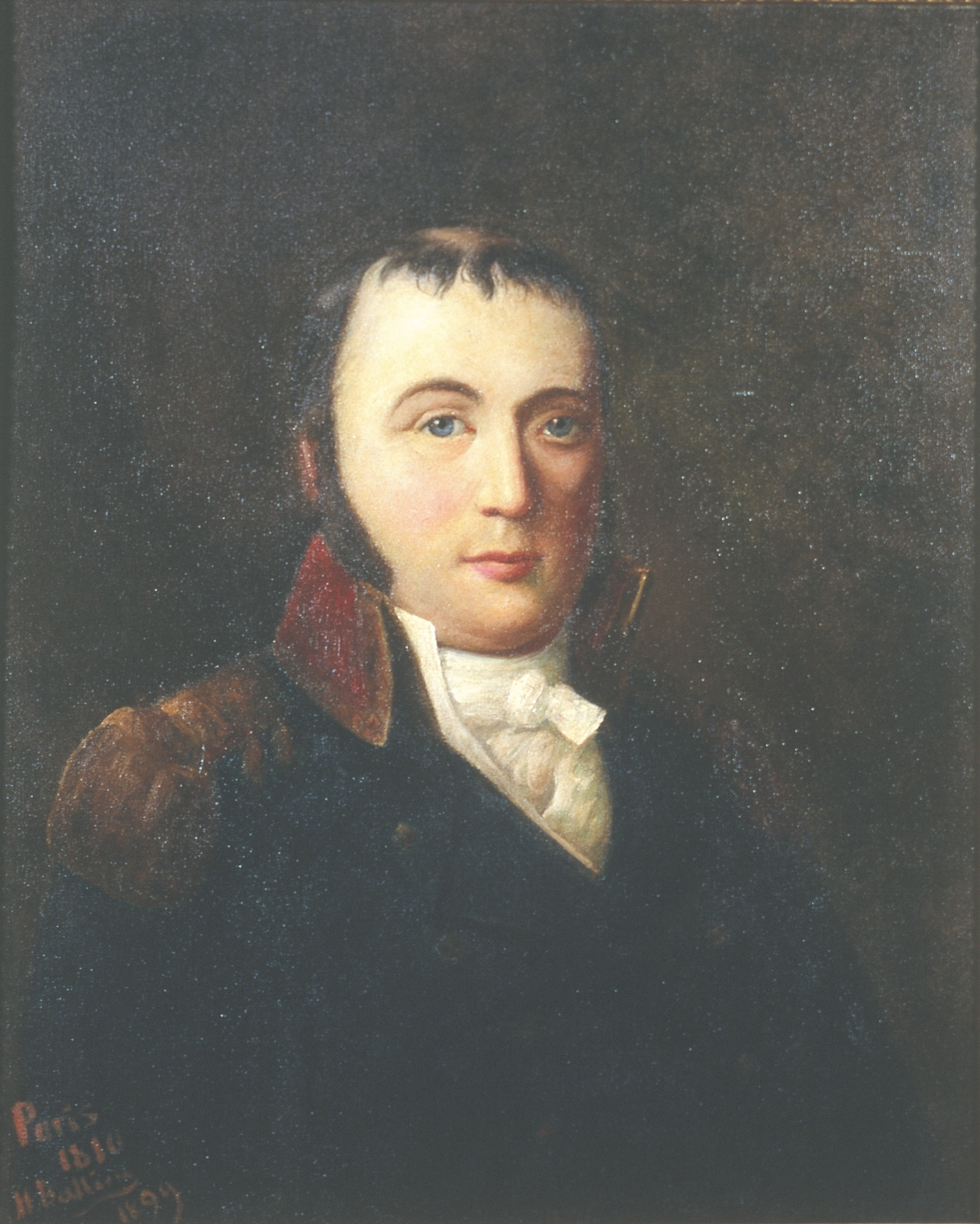
Andreas Michael Heiberg painted by Ole Peter Hansen Balling after a miniature from 1810.

Andreas Michael Heiberg (1 December 1767 – 21 March 1815) was a Norwegian jurist and politician. He served as a representative at the Norwegian Constitutional Assembly.

Andreas Michael Heiberg was born at Straumsnes in Bergen, Norway. His father was a bailiff in Bergen who later served as district governor of Bornholm, Denmark. He grew up in Denmark and took his legal examination in 1789. He first served as a bailiff in the town of Svaneke on Bornholm. He was also district magistrate at Østre Herred in Bornholm. From 1810 he was a local magistrate and town clerk in Fredrikstad in Østfold.

He represented Fredrikstad at the Norwegian Constituent Assembly at Eidsvoll in 1814. At the assembly, he supported the independence party (Selvstendighetspartiet).

== Related Reading ==
- Holme Jørn (2014) De kom fra alle kanter – Eidsvollsmennene og deres hus (Oslo: Cappelen Damm) ISBN 978-82-02-44564-5
