= Nicolai Schejtli =

Norwegian politician

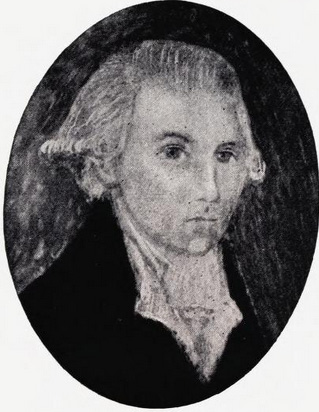
- Nicolai Schejtli
- Born: 24 June 1753; Christiania, Norway
- Died: 4 April 1824 (aged 70)
- Occupation: mining official
- Known for: Member of the Norwegian Constitutional Assembly, 1814; Member of the Storting

Nicolai Schejtli (24 June 1753 – 4 April 1824) was a Norwegian mining official and politician.

Nicolai Schejtli was born is Christiania now Oslo. His father was Public procurator and later Magistrate in Øvre Romerike. From 1802, Nicolai Schejtli served in Buskerud as commissioner of the Kongsberg Silver Mines (Kongsberg Sølvverk) and Blaafarveværket mining company at Åmot in what is now Modum Municipality.

He represented Drammen at the Norwegian Constituent Assembly at Eidsvoll Manor in 1814. He was also a member of the Parliament of Norway where he represented Drammen during 1818.
