= Andreas Rogert =

Norwegian jurist and politician

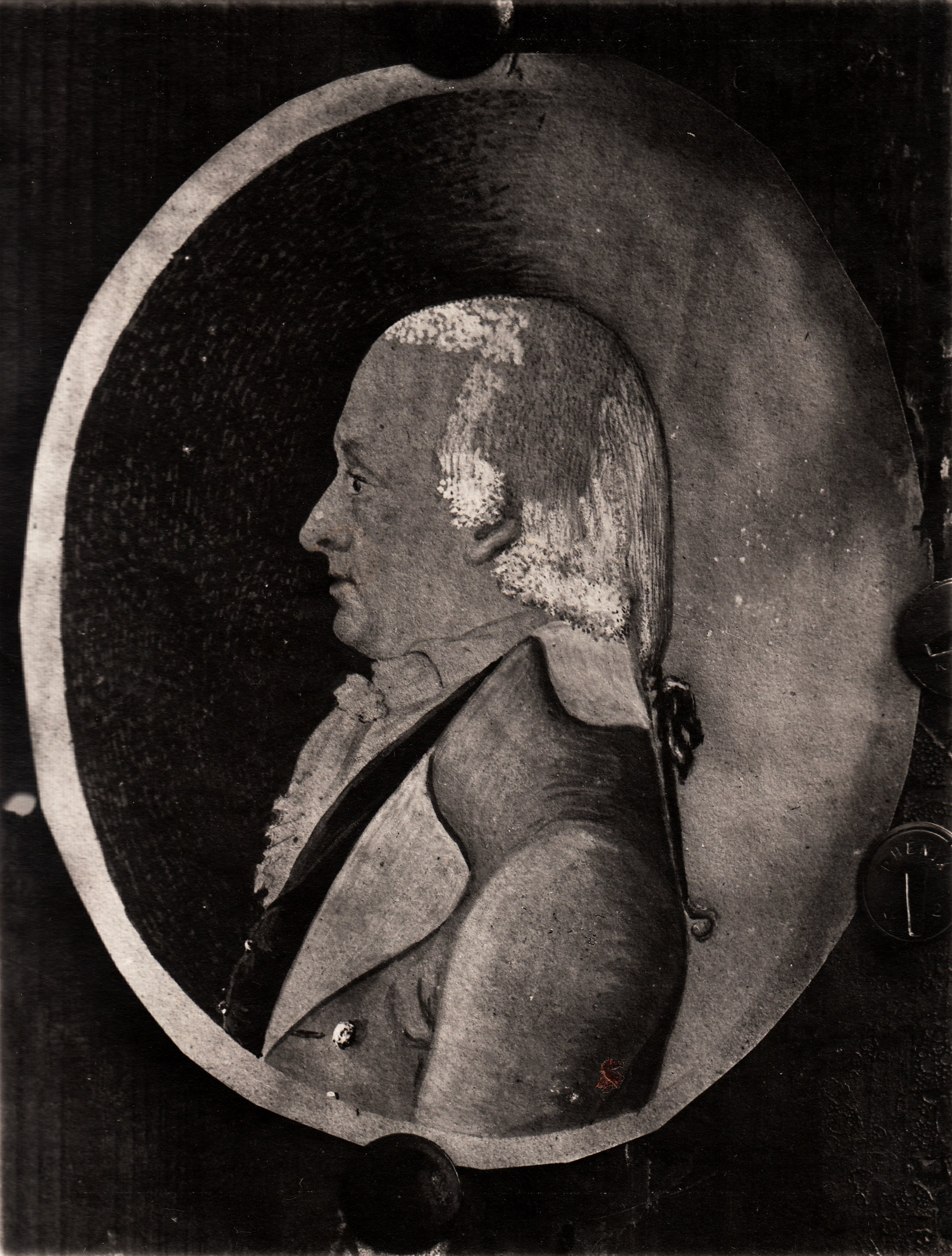

Norwegian Constitutional Assembly
- In office 1814–1814

Personal details
- Born: 18 November 1754 Trondheim, Norway
- Died: 10 June 1833 (aged 78)
- Occupation: Jurist and politician

Andreas Rogert (18 November 1754 – 10 June 1833) was a Norwegian jurist and politician.

Rogert was born in Trondhjem (now Trondheim), Norway, on 18 November 1754. He acquired a legal education in Copenhagen in 1779. He worked as a judge and assessor before he became Chief Justice during 1805. He maintained a residence at Collin-gården in Bispegata.

He represented the city of Trondhjem at the Norwegian Constituent Assembly in 1814, together with merchant Peter Schmidt. He was vice-president for meeting the first week, and was one of the fifteen who sat in the Constitutional Committee. He generally favored Selvstendighetspartiet (The Independence Party). He was not active in politics after the National Assembly.

He died in Trondheim on 10 June 1833.
