= Zacharias Mellebye =

Norwegian farmer and non-commissioned military officer

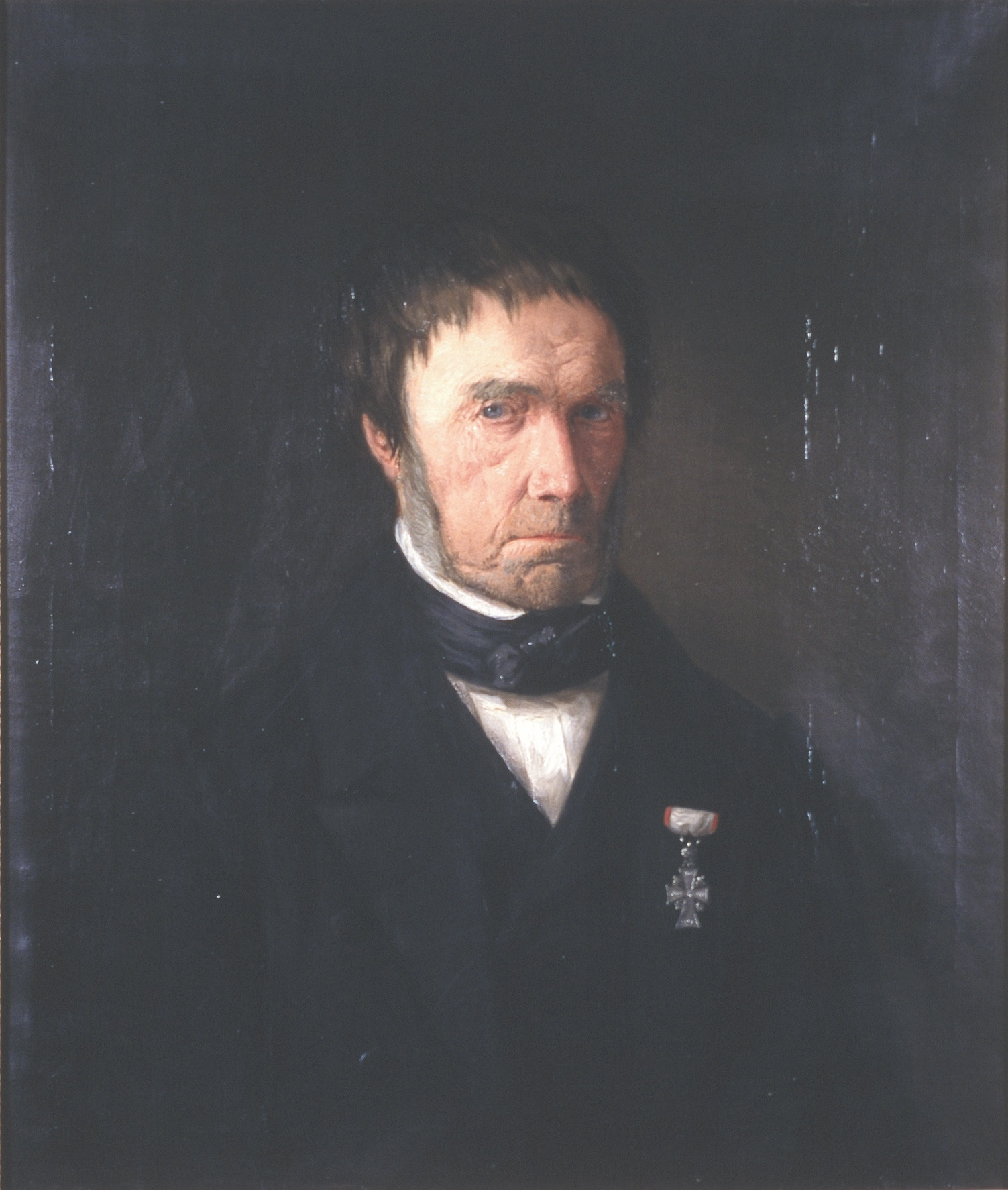
Zacharias Mellebye

Zacharias Mellebye (20 December 1781 – 9 November 1854) was a Norwegian farmer and non-commissioned military officer who served as a representative at the Norwegian Constituent Assembly.

== Biography ==
Zacharias Rasmussen Mellebye was born on Udengen in Skjeberg parish at Sarpsborg in Østfold, Norway. He participated in the military as a non-commissioned officer in both in 1808 and 1814. He was a commander in the Aker Sharpshooter Regiment (Akershusiske skarpskytterregiment). He represented his regiment at the Norwegian Constituent Assembly in 1814. He generally supported the independence party (Selvstendighetspartiet).

== Personal life ==
He was married to Sofie Magnusdatter Begbye (1781- 1872) with whom he had eight children.
