= Iver Hesselberg =

Norwegian businessman

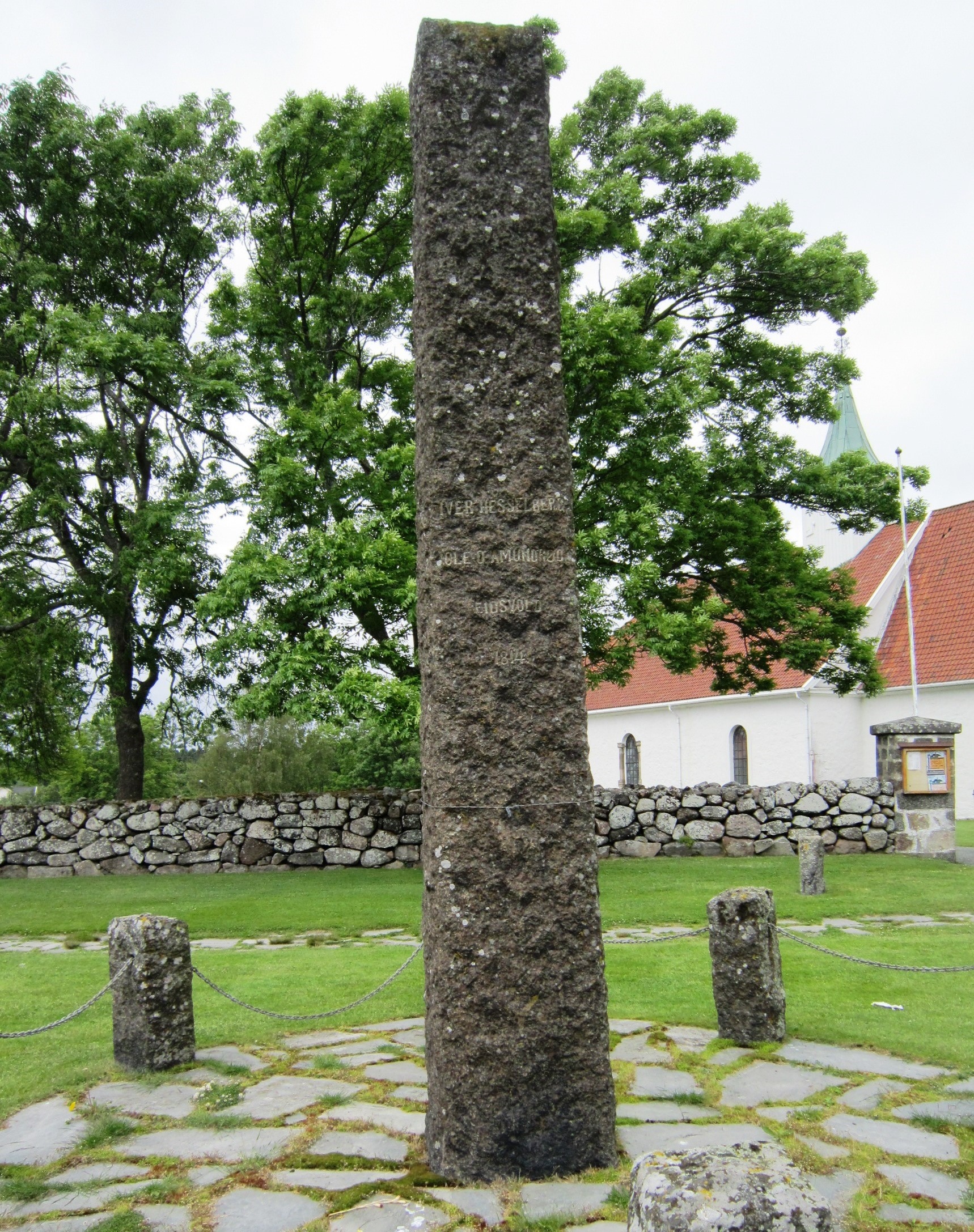
Stone monument commemorating Ole Olsen Amundrød and Iver Hesselberg at Tjølling Church

Iver Hesselberg (4 November 1762 – 26 January 1838) was a Norwegian businessman who served as a representative at the Norwegian Constitutional Assembly.

Iver Magnussen Hesselberg was born at Larvik in Vestfold, Norway. He was the son of merchant Magnus Hesselberg (ca. 1729-ca. 1780). In his youth he went to sea and became a skipper. He later settled on Brekke in the Tjølling prestegjeld in Vestfold. He was the owner of a shipyards at Hølen in Akershus. He also operated several ships principally for the transport of grain. He was married in 1801 with his cousin Anna Catharina Cecilia Heegaard (1769–1826) with whom he had two sons, Magnus (1804–1877) who served as a member of the Norwegian Parliament and Hans Jørgen (1810–1864).

He also served as one of the Settlement Commissioners (Forlikskommissær) on the Conciliation Board (Forliksråd) for his village for many years. Together with Anders Hansen Grønneberg and Ole Olsen Amundrød, he represented Laurvigs Grevskab (now Larvik) at the Norwegian Constituent Assembly at Eidsvoll Manor in 1814. All three representatives supported the independence party (Selvstendighetspartiet).

== Related Reading ==
- Holme Jørn (2014) De kom fra alle kanter - Eidsvollsmennene og deres hus (Oslo: Cappelen Damm) ISBN 978-82-02-44564-5
