= Nicolai Niels Nielsen =

Norwegian politician

Nicolai Niels Nielsen (3 March 1777 – 10 July 1854) was a Norwegian priest and politician.

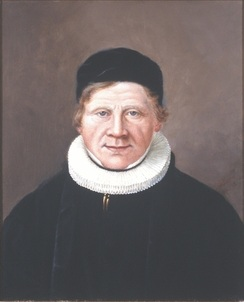
Nicolai Niels Nielsen

He was born in the village Bolbro on Funen, Denmark. He took his Cand.theol. in Copenhagen in 1804, and initially worked as a teacher in Zealand. In 1807 he moved to Norway, becoming a priest in Vardø in Finnmark, serving at Vardø Church. In 1810 he relocated to Holmedal Church in Sunnfjord.

He was a member of the Norwegian Constitutional Assembly at Eidsvoll in 1814. Together with Lars Johannes Irgens and Peder Hjermann, he was a representative of Nordre Bergenhuus (now Sogn og Fjordane). He primarily supported the position of the Independence Party (Selvstendighetspartiet)

Nielsen was appointed priest in Eid Church in Nordfjord during 1821, and dean at the Indre Sogn deanery in Borgund Church in Nordre Bergenhus from 1835. While stationed in Eid, he was elected to the Norwegian Parliament in 1830, representing the constituency of Nordre Bergenhus Amt (now Sogn og Fjordane). His primary interest was education policy.
