= Helmer Andersen Gjedeboe =

Norwegian Constitutional Assembly
- In office 1814–1814

Personal details
- Born: 9 February 1786 Orkdal Municipality, Norway
- Died: 26 September 1854 (aged 68)
- Occupation: Non-commissioned military officer, shop keeper and police officer

Helmer Andersen Gjedeboe (9 February 1786 – 26 September 1854) was a non-commissioned military officer. He served as a representative at the Norwegian Constitutional Assembly.

Helmer Andersen Gjedeboe was born on the Geitbuen farm in Orkdalen (now part of Orkland Municipality) in Søndre Trondhjem county, Norway. Helmer Gjedebo began his military career as a soldier in 1804. After he completed his military service in 1818, he ran a shop. In 1824, he received a license as a distiller. He entered public service as police officer in Trondheim from 1838–1850. His former residence in Trondheim was moved in 1979, rebuilt and opened in the Trondelag Folk Museum (Trøndelag Folkemuseum).

He represented the Second Trondhjem Regiment (Trondhjemske Infanteribrigade) at the Norwegian Constituent Assembly in 1814 at Eidsvoll Manor, together with Jacob Erik Lange. During the Assembly, he supported the position of the independence party (selvstendighetspartiet).

== Related Reading ==
- Holme Jørn (2014) De kom fra alle kanter - Eidsvollsmennene og deres hus (Oslo: Cappelen Damm) ISBN 978-82-02-44564-5
