= Jens Schou Fabricius =

Norwegian naval officer (1758–1841)

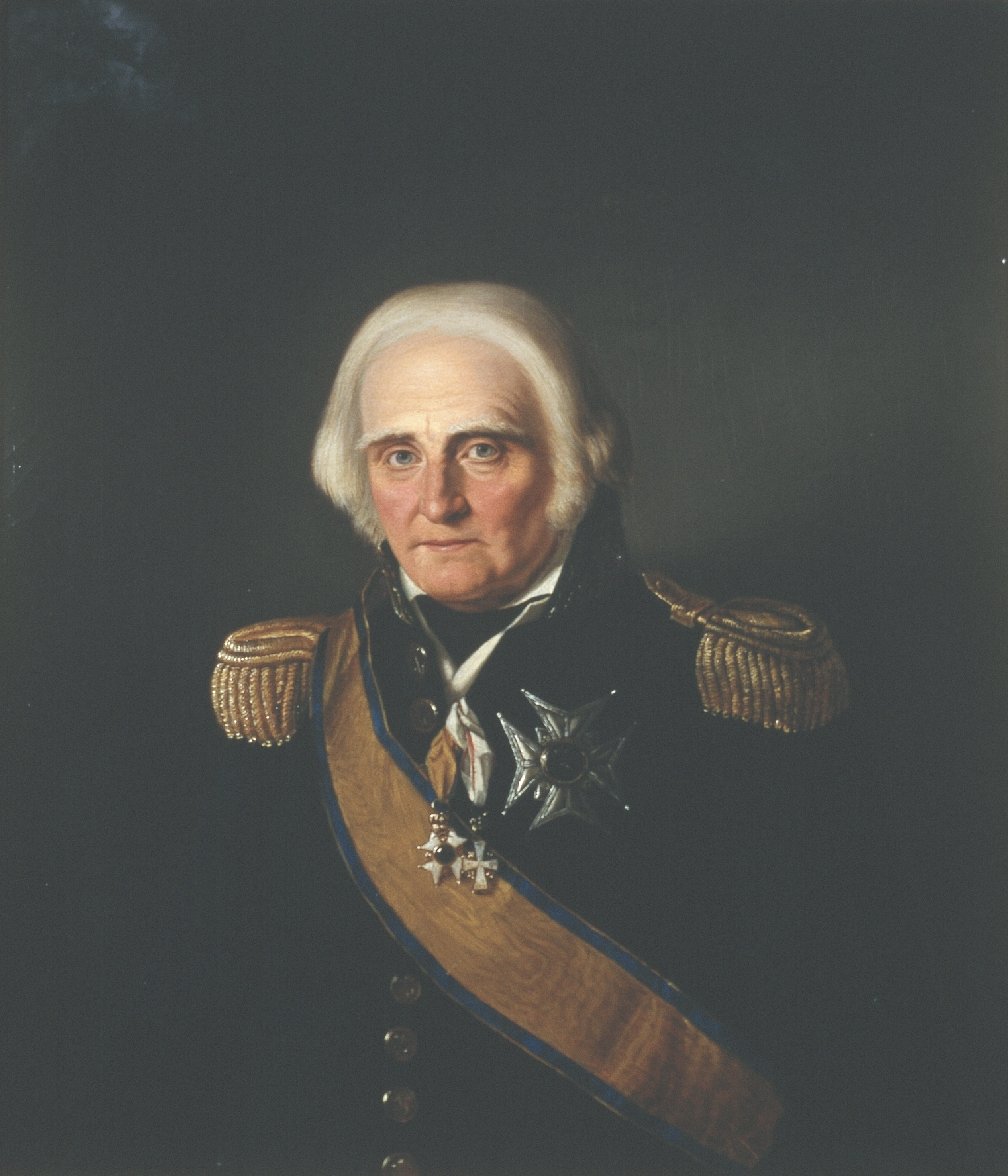
- Jens Schow Fabricius by Christian Olsen]
- Born: 3 March 1758; Larvik, Norway
- Died: 6 April 1841 (aged 83); Osebakken near Porsgrund, Norway
- Burial place: Porsgrund Churchyard
- Military career
- Allegiance: Denmark–Norway; Norway
- Branch: Royal Dano-Norwegian Navy; Royal Norwegian Navy
- Service years: 1762 - 1814 (Denmark-Norway); 1814 - 1836 (Norway)
- Rank: Vice Admiral
- Other work: Member of the Norwegian Parliament, Minister for the Navy, Representative at the Norwegian constitutional Assembly

Vice-Admiral Jens Schou Fabricius (3 March 1758 – 6 April 1841) was a Norwegian naval officer who served as Minister of the Navy from 1817 to 1818. He served as a representative for Søe-Deffensionen at the Norwegian Constitutional Assembly at Eidsvoll Manor in 1814. During his naval career he served first the Danish-Norwegian Crown until the separation in 1814 of Norway and Denmark, and thereafter the Norwegian-Swedish Crown. Fabricius retired from the navy as a vice admiral.

== Background ==
Jens Schou Fabricius was born in Larvik, Norway. He was the son of District Judge Laurs Sørensen Fabricius (1695-1761). Jens Schou Fabriciu was a student at the Royal Danish Naval Academy in Copenhagen from the age of eleven.

== Danish-Norwegian service ==
He became a junior lieutenant on 20 December 1779. (Note: There is a slight discrepancy on dates between the Norwegian Wikipedia article and the Topsøe-Jensen reference. Topsøe-Jensen is given preference here.) He was promoted to senior lieutenant on 25 January 1788. to lieutenant-commander on 13 November 1789 and to captain on 31 May 1799.

1781–1787

He was Ekvipagemester (Head of Naval Stores) (Note: Ekvipagemester translates literally as Master of Horse, but this is an honorary appointment. The definition/job description from a Danish Dictionary (Gyldendals) is for the naval officer in the time of sailing ships with responsibilities in the dockyard for the fitting out of the fleet and for the management of all the naval storehouses.) for the Danish company trading from the Baltic to Guinea in West Africa from 1781 to 1787, during which time he journeyed to the Mediterranean Sea with the warship Oldenborg and to China as first mate on the Charlotte Amalie.

1788–1799

He saw service in the frigate Store Belt which, in 1788, was a cadet training ship, as second-in-command of the frigate Alsen when she was acting as guard-ship in the Øresund, and as captain of the smaller Speideren in the home squadron. In October 1788 he became deputy ekvipagemester at Fredriksvern in Vestfold and in the following years was often away on tours of duties with various ships, as captain.

In 1795 Fabricius sailed to the Danish West Indies, but he could not tolerate the climate and was sent home by his senior officer. In 1797 he sailed as captain of the brig Lougen which was part of a squadron destined for the Mediterranean Sea. On the outward journey his ship broached in a storm in the North Sea but righted herself with four feet of water in the hold and in the cabins. Fabricius and Lougen returned to Copenhagen on 6 August 1799.

1800–1809

After a period as second-in-command of the warship Danmark in the home squadron, and some sick leave, Fabricius was appointed in October 1801 as commander of the port and fortress at Fredriksvern, including the Norwegian flotilla of small gunboats. With the outbreak of hostilities between Denmark and Britain, he became a member of the commission responsible for planning Norway’s maritime defences.

1810–1814

In 1810 his duties at Fredriksvern were reduced whilst he still retained command together with the directorships of the church, school, pilotage and quarantine departments. In 1812 Fabricius sought a transfer to another position where he could better do his best, but this achieved little.

On 1 March 1814 he resigned from his Danish-Norwegian war duties.

== Norwegian service ==
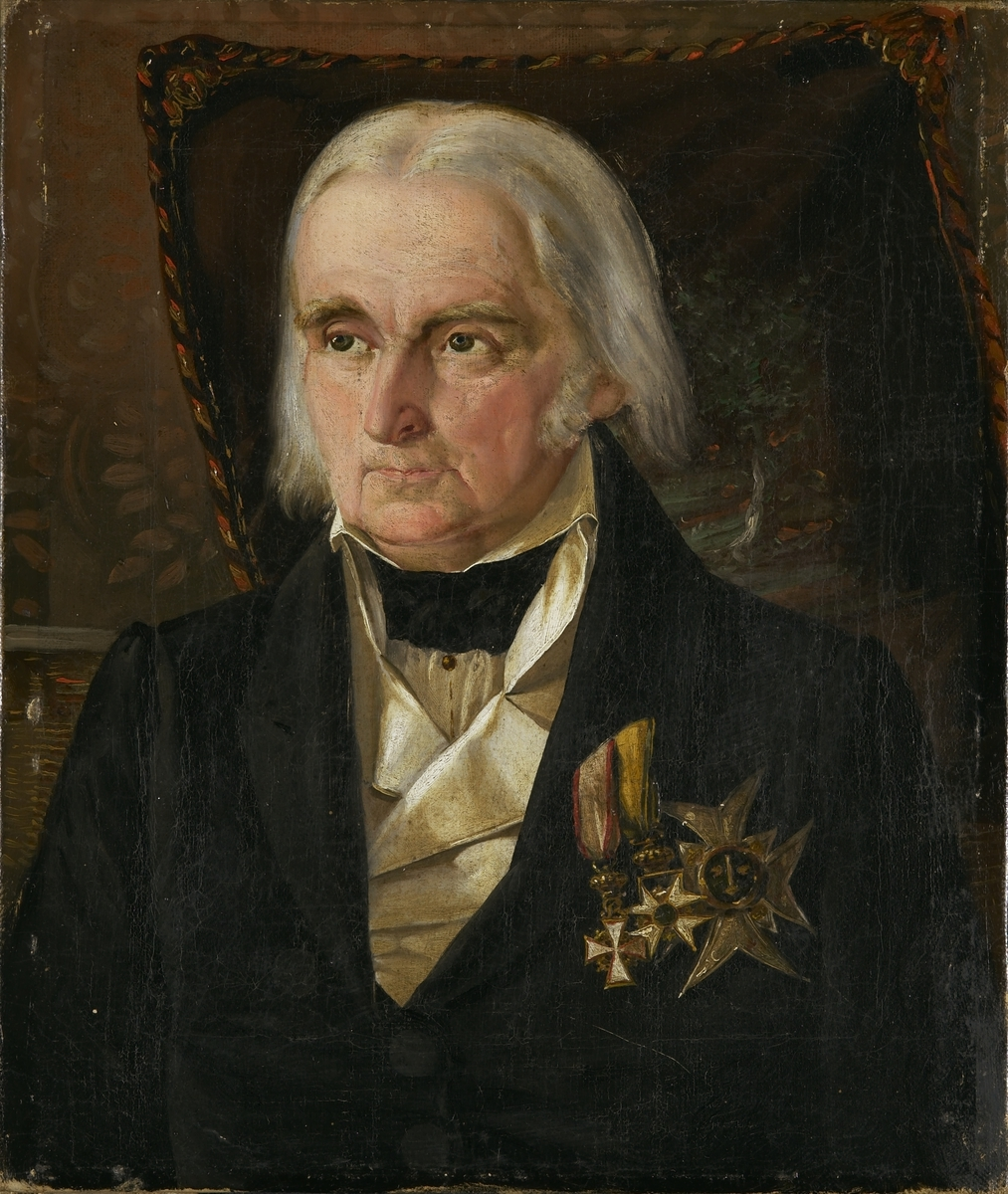
Portrait of Fabricius by an unknown artist, Oslo Museum

1814–1824

On 13 April 1814 Fabricius’ name was deleted from the list of Danish naval officers as he had sworn loyalty to the Norwegian government without having obtained a release from Denmark.

On 19 February 1816, Danish Captain Carl Adolph Rothe, Copenhagen's harbour master, arrived in Christiana (now Oslo) to negotiate with Norway’s Thomas Fasting, Norwegian temporary Councillor of State, the return of the seven warbrigs that had ended up in Norwegian waters after the Treaty of Kiel. The negotiations were taken up by his Norwegian counterpart the (now) rear admiral, Admiral Jens Schou Fabricius, who did not dispute the Danish king's right to five of the brigs, but proposed consideration of the feeling in Norway whether the affair could be settled by Norway paying suitable compensation for keeping the ships. On 22 June agreement was reached between Fabricius and Rothe. The brigs Allart and Seagull which had been captured in Norwegian waters were awarded to the Norwegian navy. The other five brigs that were already in Norway would stay there on payment of 95,000 speciedlr (a little over $2 million US dollars bullion value in 012). Thomas Fasting, then Minister for Maritime Affairs (marinesaker), was succeeded by Jens Fabricius for the period 1817-1818, then Fasting took over again.

In 1818, Fabricius became adjutant general to Charles XIV John, King of Sweden and Norway and was promoted to vice admiral on 23 August 1821. He was elected to the Norwegian Parliament in 1824 as a representative for Bratsberg (now Telemark).

Later

He retired, at the age of 78, in 1836 and died in Porsgrunn on 6 April 1841.

== Primary Source ==
- Translated from the Norwegian (Norsk bokmål) Wikipedia article Jens Fabricius

== Other sources ==
- Topsøe-Jensen, T. A. and Emil Marquard (1935) Officerer i den dansk-norske Søetat 1660-1814 og den danske Søetat 1814-1932 (Copenhagen: H. Hagerups Boghandel)
- Holme Jørn (2014) De kom fra alle kanter - Eidsvollsmennene og deres hus (Oslo: Cappelen Damm) ISBN 978-82-02-44564-5
