= Even Thorsen =

Norwegian sailor and farmer (1778–1867)

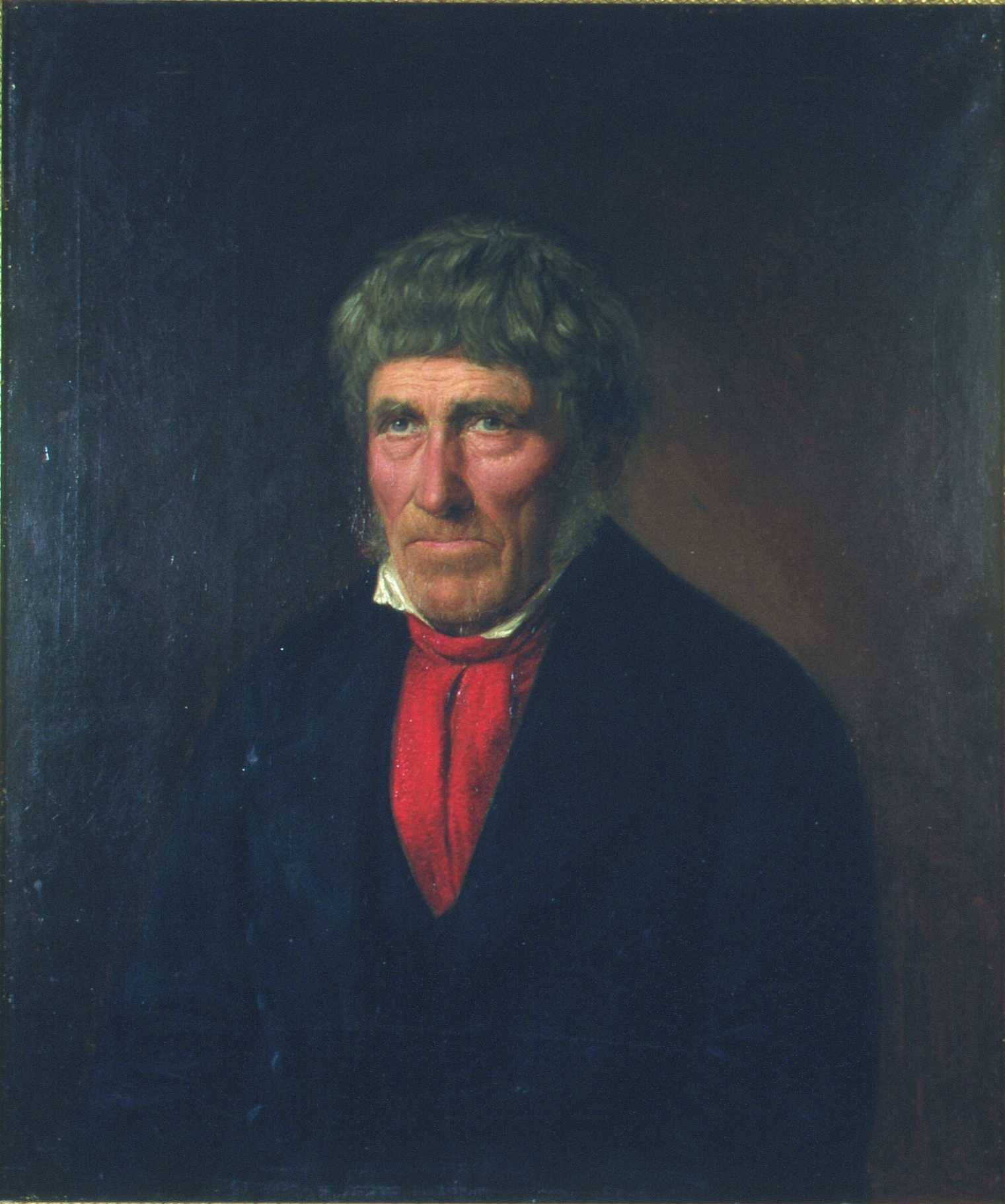
- Even Thorsen, portrayed by Christian Olsen
- Born: 26 August 1778; Østre Moland, Norway
- Died: 24 March 1867 (aged 88)
- Occupations: sailor and farmer
- Known for: Member of the Norwegian Constitutional Assembly, 1814

Even Thorsen ( 26 August 1778 – 24 March 1867 ) was a Norwegian sailor, farmer, and representative at the Norwegian Constituent Assembly at Eidsvoll Manor.

Even Thorsen was born at the Bjornes farm at Østre Moland (now in Arendal Municipality), in Nedenes county, Norway. In his youth, he went to sea working as a deckhand. During the Napoleonic Wars, he was a prisoner of war in the United Kingdom from 1807, returning to Norway in 1810. As an adult, he lived with his family at Blekestrand, a farm in Flosta in Nedenes.

He represented the Royal Norwegian Navy (Sjødefensjonen) at the Norwegian Constituent Assembly in 1814. Thorsen sympathized with the Independence Party (Selvstendighetspartiet). In 1857, the Norwegian Parliament granted him an annual honorary pension three years prior to his death.
