= Diderik Hegermann =

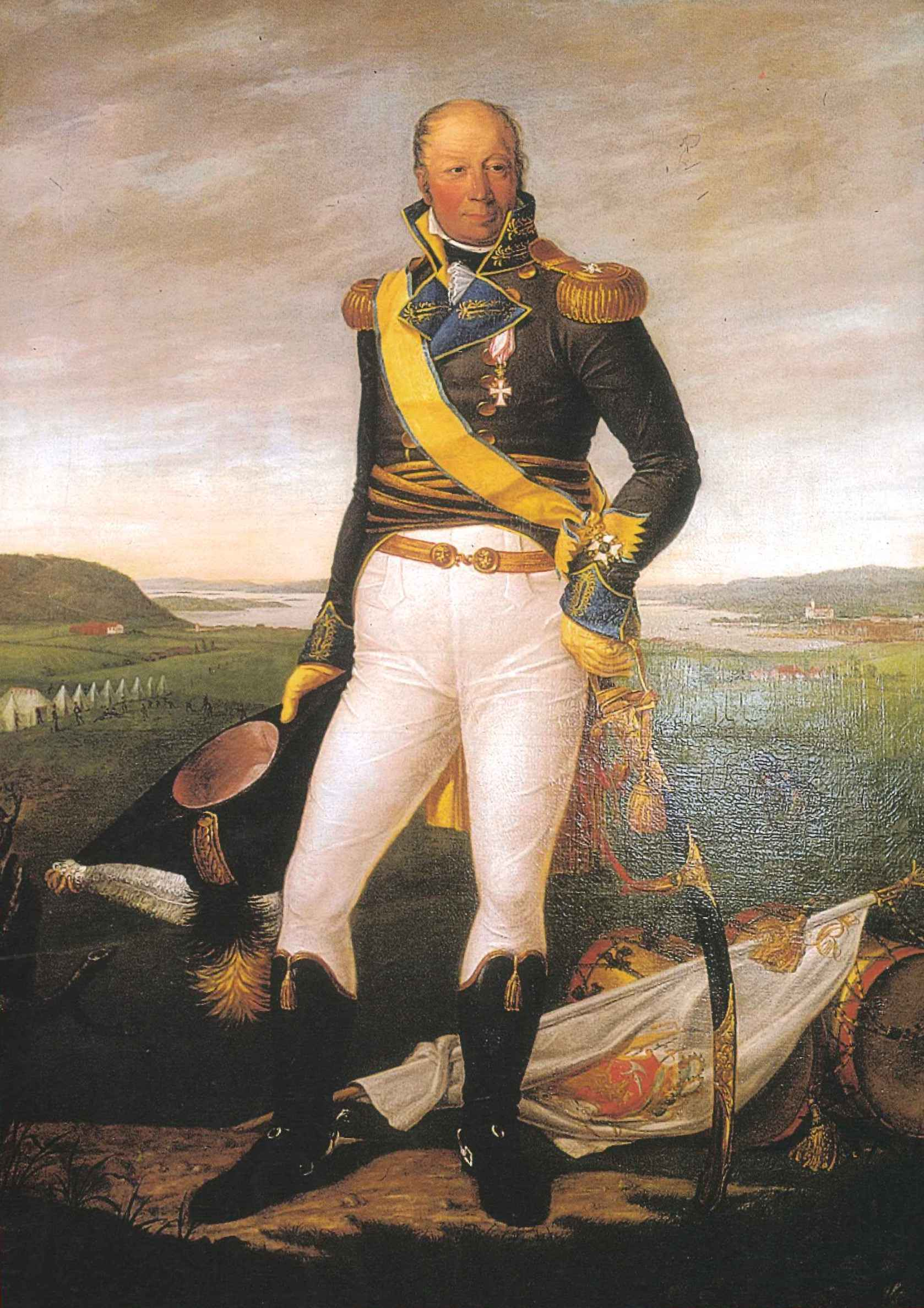
- Diderik Hegermann painted by Jacob Munch in 1816.
- Born: 6 December 1763; Altona, Duchy of Holstein
- Died: 7 February 1835 (aged 71)
- Military career
- Allegiance: Denmark–Norway; Kingdom of Norway; United Kingdoms of Sweden and Norway
- Branch: Norwegian Army
- Service years: 1776–1817
- Rank: (Denmark–Norway) Lieutenant colonel (Norway) Colonel
- Unit: Oppland Infantry Regiment
- Commands: Oppland Infantry Regiment
- Conflicts: Napoleonic Wars; Swedish-Norwegian War (1814); Battle of Langnes
- Awards: Knight of the Order of the Dannebrog
- Other work: Member of the Norwegian Constituent Assembly

Minister of the Army
- In office 1814–1816
- Preceded by: Office established
- Succeeded by: Peter Motzfeldt

Diderik Hegermann (6 December 1763 – 7 February 1835) was a military officer and government minister of Norway. He served as a member of the Norwegian Constituent Assembly in 1814.

== Biography ==
Diderik Hegermann was born in Altona in the Duchy of Holstein. In accordance with family tradition, he chose a military career. He became a cadet in 1776 and served as a Sergeant until 1786. He became a Lieutenant in 1786 in the Corps of Cadets in Copenhagen. In 1790, he was appointed Captain. In 1800, he was promoted to Major and appointed commander on the War School in Christiania (now Oslo). In 1808, he became Lieutenant Colonel and from 1812 he was commander of Oppland Infantry Regiment. Hegermann served as Colonel during the Swedish–Norwegian War (1814). He led the defense at the Battle of Langnes.

Diderik Hegermann represented the Oppland infantry Regiment (Oplandske Infanterie Regement) at the Norwegian Constitutional Assembly at Eidsvold in 1814. He was a member of the Constitutional Committee and supported the independence party (Selvstendighetspartiet). He served on the Norwegian Councilor of State of the 6th Ministry (war administration) in 1814 and 1814–1815 and Minister of the Army 1815–1816. In 1817, he was granted a discharge from government service.

He was married in 1815 to Hanne Christine Susanne Nideros (1779–1858), widow of Daniel Isaachsen Willoch who had died in 1813. Following his retirement, he entered the lumber business, operating sawmills and a shipyard at Tveit in Vest-Agder .

== Honors ==
Hegermann was decorated as a Knight of the Order of the Dannebrog.

== Related reading ==
- Holme Jørn (2014) De kom fra alle kanter - Eidsvollsmennene og deres hus (Oslo: Cappelen Damm) ISBN 978-82-02-44564-5
