= Peder Hjermann =

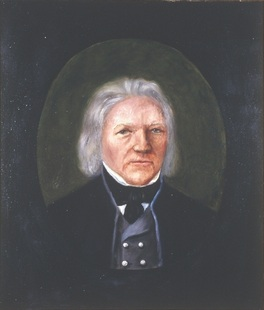
Peder Hjermann (Eidsvoll 1814)

Peder Hjermann (1 December 1754 – 25 December 1834) was a farmer and elected official who served as a representative at the Norwegian Constitutional Assembly.

Peder (Per) Pedersson Hjermann was born in Lærdal in Nordre Bergenhus county. He was youngest of seven siblings born to the sheriff in the village. In adulthood, he became a farmer at the Stødno farm which was located in the Hauge parish of Lærdal Municipality. He also served as one of the Settlement Commissioners (Forlikskommissær) from the time the Conciliation Board (Forliksråd ) was introduced in rural areas in 1797 until 1813.

Peder Hjermann represented Nordre Bergenhus amt (now part of Vestland county) at the Norwegian Constituent Assembly at Eidsvoll Manor in 1814 together with Lars Johannes Irgens and Niels Nielsen. All three representatives supported the independence party (Selvstendighetspartiet).

== Related Reading ==
- Holme Jørn (2014) De kom fra alle kanter - Eidsvollsmennene og deres hus (Oslo: Cappelen Damm) ISBN 978-82-02-44564-5
