= Hieronymus Heyerdahl (1773–1847) =

Norwegian minister and politician

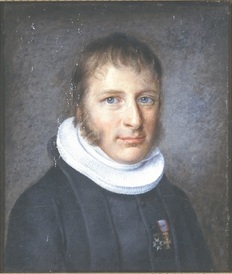
Hieronymus Heyerdahl

Hieronymus Heyerdahl (31 August 1773 – 6 March 1847) was a Norwegian minister and politician.

Hieronymus Heyerdahl was born in Aremark in Østfold county, Norway. He attended Christiania Latin School from which he graduated in 1790. After studying at the University of Copenhagen, he earned his theological degree in 1794. He served a parish priest for more than 50 years. He served as minister in Stjørdalen from 1812, and in Gran from 1835, where he remained until his death in 1847.

He represented Nordre Trondhjems amt at the Norwegian Constituent Assembly in 1814, together with Hans Christian Ulrik Midelfart and Sivert Bratberg. He published scientific works on mineralogy (Bidrag til en mineralogisk-geognostisk Beskrivelse over Ringsager og Thotens Præstegjælde from 1811), and on meteorology (Meterologiske Iagttagelser 1825 i Størdalens Præstegjæld).
