= Omund Bjørnsen Birkeland =

Norwegian farmer and soldier

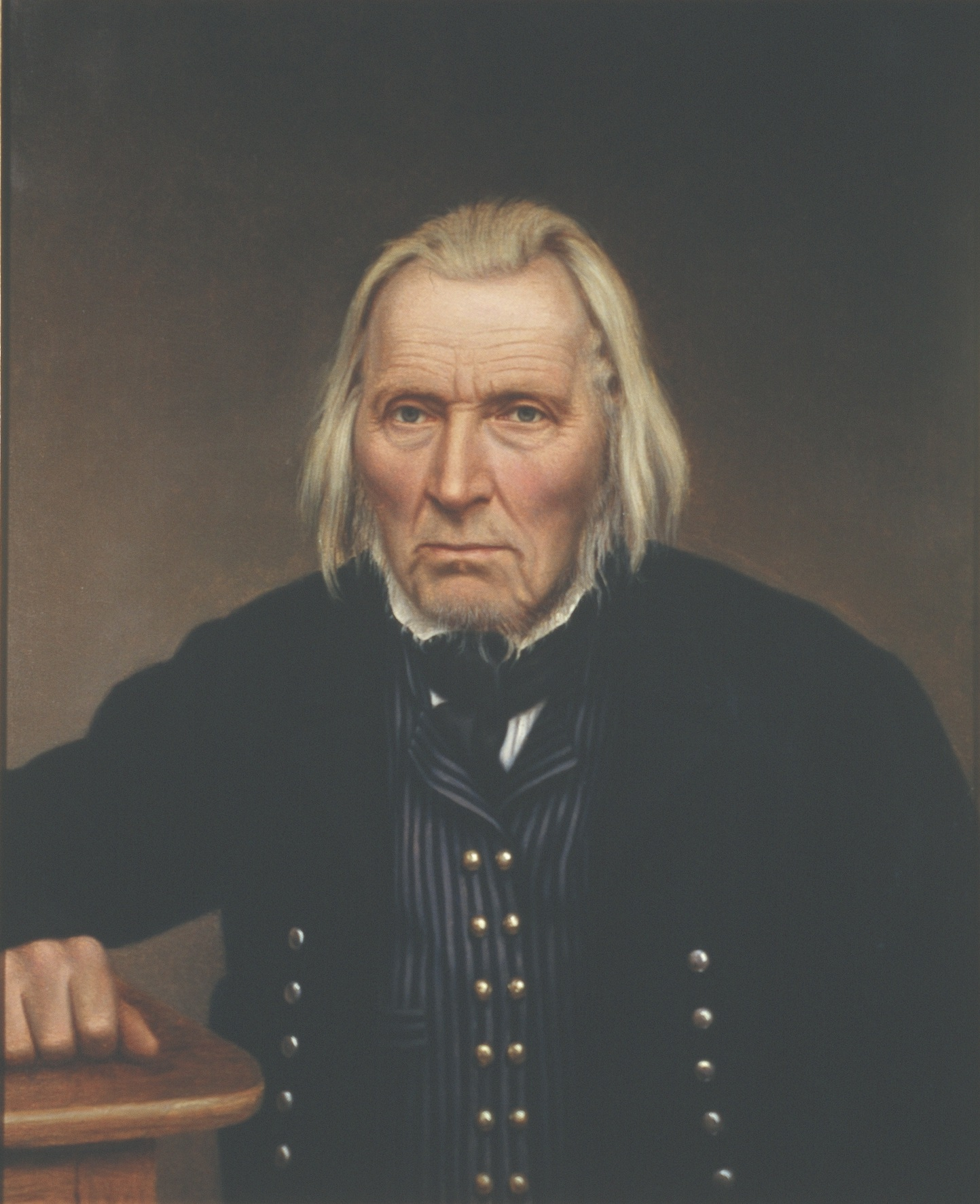
Omund Bjørnsen Birkeland by P. Meidell. Owner: Eidsvoll 1814. From DigitaltMuseum

Omund Bjørnsen Birkeland (30 April 1786 – 14 April 1862) was a Norwegian farmer and soldier. He served as a representative at the Norwegian Constitutional Assembly at Eidsvoll Manor in 1814.

Omund Bjørnsen Birkeland was born on the Birkeland farm in the parish of Undal near the village of Konsmo in the Audnedalen valley in Lister og Mandal county, Norway. He took over the farm from his father in 1808, at a time he was in military service. He served with the Vesterlenske Infantry Regiment (Vesterlenske infanteriregiment) which was a division in the Norwegian Army. The soldiers within the unit were recruited from Telemark, Nedenes, and Rogaland counties as well as from Lister og Mandal county. He was married to Asbør Torgiusdotter and the couple had three children.

He represented Vesterlenske infanteriregiment at the Norwegian Constituent Assembly in 1814, together with Major Just Henrik Ely. At the Assembly, he supported the position of the union party (Unionspartiet).

== Related Reading ==
- Holme Jørn (2014) De kom fra alle kanter - Eidsvollsmennene og deres hus (Oslo: Cappelen Damm) ISBN 978-82-02-44564-5
