= Peder Valentin Rosenkilde =

Norwegian merchant and politician

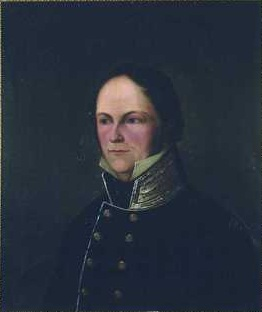
- Born: 6 August 1772; Stavanger, Norway
- Died: 10 June 1836 (aged 63)
- Known for: Member of the Norwegian Constituent Assembly, 1814

Peder Valentin Rosenkilde (6 August 1772 – 10 June 1836) was a Norwegian merchant and politician. He was a member of the Norwegian Constituent Assembly at Eidsvoll in 1814.

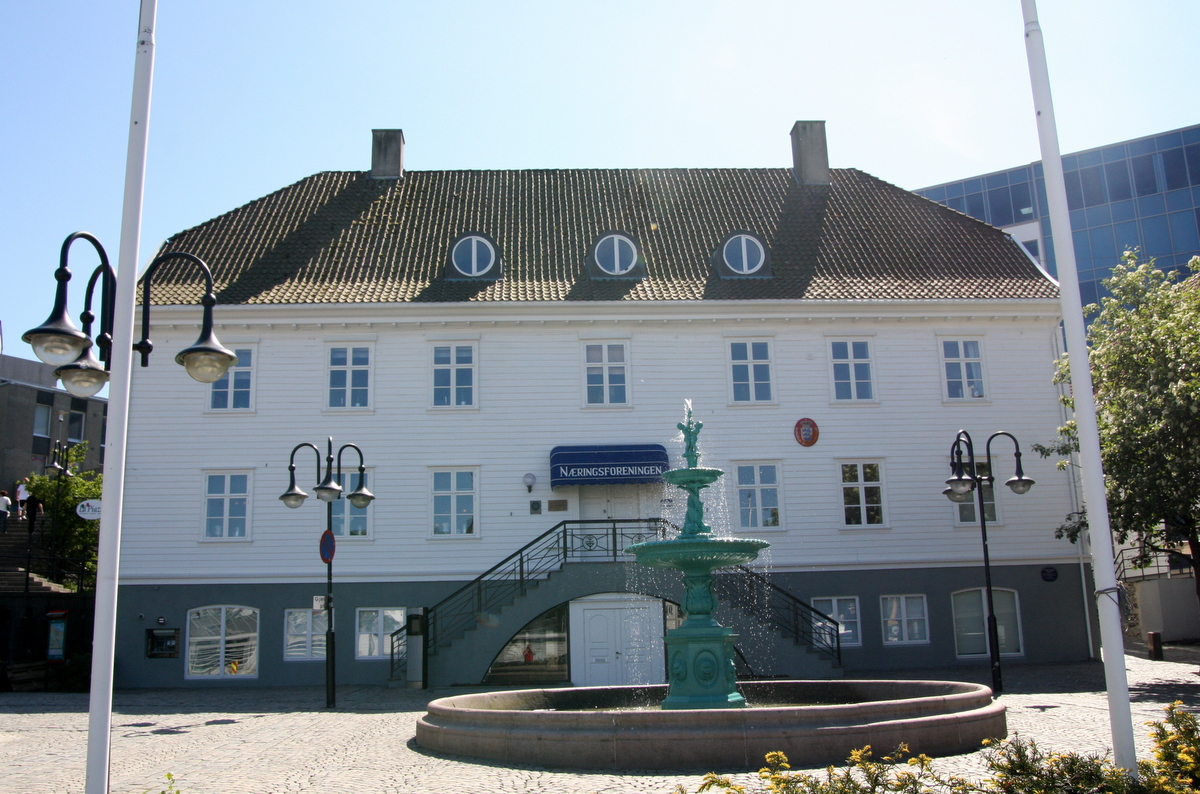
Rosenkildehuset in Stavanger

Rosenkilde was born at Stavanger in Rogaland, Norway. He was the son of Børge Henriksen Rosenkilde (1734-1820) and his second wife Anna Vilhelmine Nyrop (1755-1827). He was born into a merchant family and received his education in trade at Hamburg, Germany. He took over his father's business interest in 1805. Rosenkilde initially focused on trade with grain and salt, but later became involved in shipping. His manor house in Stavanger, Rosenkildehuset, was built in 1811. It was the largest private residence in Stavanger at the time.

He represented Stavanger at the Norwegian Constituent Assembly at Eidsvoll in 1814. At the National Assembly, he generally supported the Independence Party (Selvstendighetspartiet) and was elected a member of the finance committee. In 1821 he was elected a member of the Parliament of Norway.

He was awarded the Danish Order of the Dannebrog.
