= Georg Ulrich Wasmuth =

Norwegian military officer

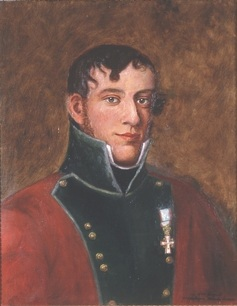
Georg Ulrich Wasmuth

Georg Ulrich Wasmuth (19 March 1788 – 16 October 1814) was a Norwegian military officer who served as a representative at the Norwegian Constitutional Assembly.

== Biography ==
Georg Ulrich Wasmuth was born at Kvernes, a village near the town of Kristiansund in Romsdalen county, Norway. Georg Ulrich underwent training at the military academy. He starting his military career as a corporal in the Nordafjelske Ski Battalion about 1804. From 1805, he was an officer in the First Trondhjemske Regiment and was promoted to Second Lieutenant in 1806 and First Lieutenant in 1808. He served in the campaign in Jämtland during the war with Sweden in 1808. In Autumn 1814, he participated in the war with Sweden and took part in engagements in Trøndelag and at Glomma.

He represented the First Trondhjemske Regiment at the Norwegian Constituent Assembly in 1814, together with Daniel Larsen Schevig. At Eidsvoll Manor, he supported the position of the independence party (Selvstendighetspartiet).

He married Mette Jacobine Christine Hirsch (1791-1878) in 1812. The couple resided at Værnes in what is now Stjørdal Municipality in Trøndelag and were the parents of two children. Georg Ulrich died shortly after the birth of their youngest child. His widow subsequently remarried.

== See also ==
- Dano-Swedish War of 1808–09
- Swedish–Norwegian War (1814)

== Related Reading ==
- Holme Jørn (2014) De kom fra alle kanter - Eidsvollsmennene og deres hus (Oslo: Cappelen Damm) ISBN 978-82-02-44564-5
