= Jacob Erik Lange =

Norwegian military officer and politician

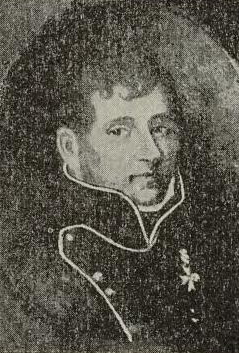

Norwegian Constitutional Assembly
- In office 1814–1814

Personal details
- Born: 3 April 1767 Bergen, Norway
- Died: 5 April 1825 (aged 58)
- Occupation: Military officer and politician

Jacob Erik Lange (3 April 1767 – 5 April 1825) was a Norwegian military officer and politician.

== History ==
He was born in Bergen. He represented the Second Trondhjemske Regiment at the Norwegian Constituent Assembly in 1814, together with Helmer Andersen Gjedeboe.
