= Frederik Heidmann =

Norwegian military officer, civil servant and politician

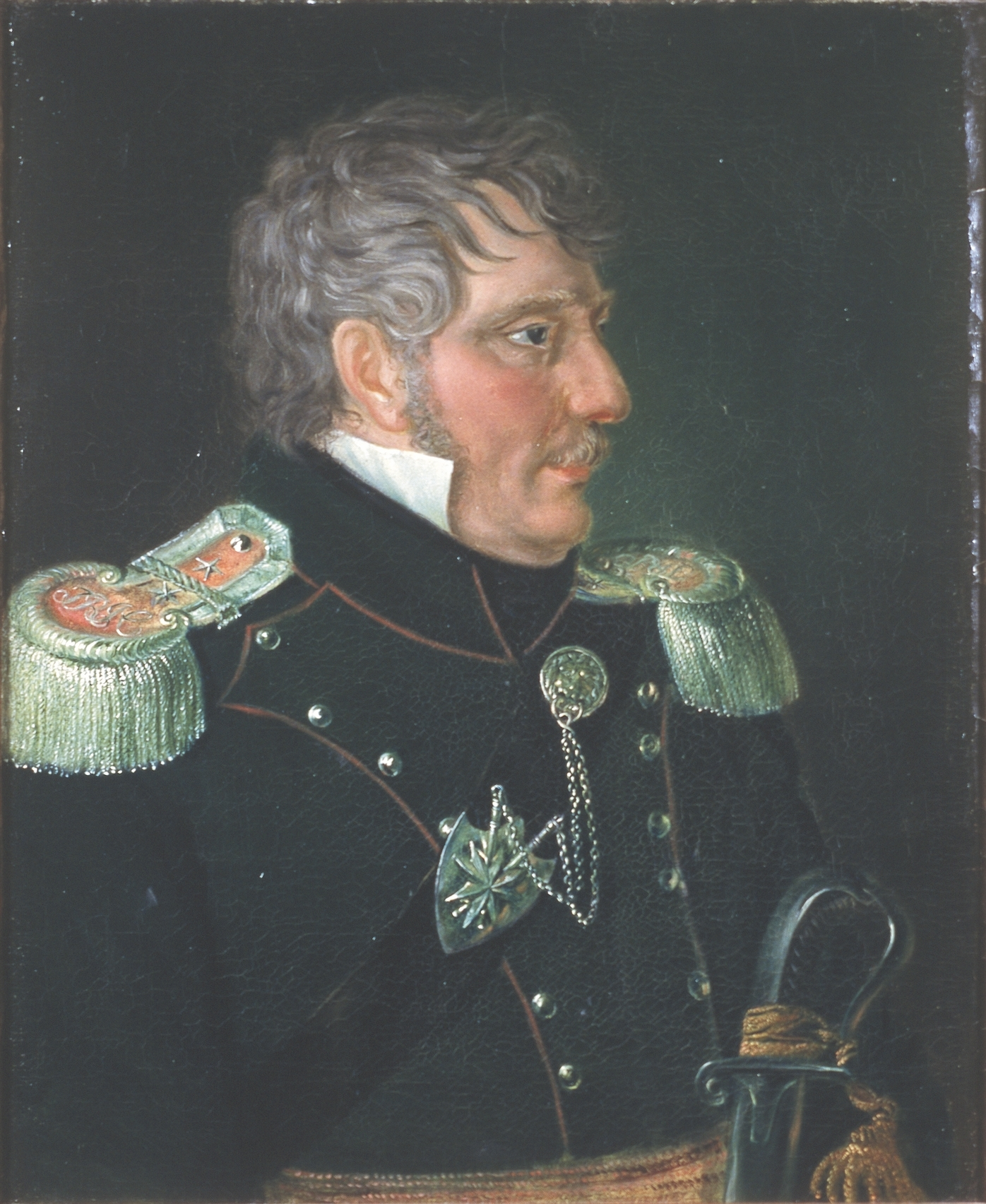
Frederik Heidmann by Matthias Stoltenberg from 1851 after a miniature by Jacob Munch

Frederik Heidmann (27 July 1777 – 17 October 1850) was a Norwegian military officer, civil servant and politician.

== Biography ==
Frederik Hartvig Johan Heidmann was born in Skogn in Nord-Trøndelag (in the present-day Levanger Municipality, Trøndelag) in Norway. He was the son of Lorentz Peter Heidmann (1732–1807) and Dorothea Mathea Sommerschield (1740–1805). He was born into an officer's family. His father was a Major in the Trondheim Infantry Regiment (Trondhjemske Infanterriregiment). He was trained for the military and in 1795 was promoted to second lieutenant. In 1803 he was promoted to first lieutenant with the Trondhjemske dragonkorps at Trondheim.

Together with Petter Johnsen Ertzgaard, he represented the Trondhjem Dragon Corps (Trondhjems dragonkorps) at the Norwegian Constituent Assembly at Eidsvoll Manor in 1814. He supported the position of the Independence Party (Selvstendighetspartiet) at the National Assembly.

He was later a member of the Parliament of Norway as a representative of Nordre Trondheim at the 1818, 1821 and 1822 parliamentary assemblies. He was President of the Odelsting in 1821. He was a representative it at the parliamentary assemblies in 1827 and 1828. In 1836 he remained a deputy representative. From 1821 he was county governor of Hedmark, a position he held until 1849.

Heidmann was married to Anna Catharina Bernhoff Ræder (1788–1858). She was the daughter of Johan Georg Ræder and sister of Johan Christopher Ræder, both of whom were military officers. He died in 1850 at his farm Kjonsud in Stange Municipality.
