= Hans Jacob Grøgaard =

Norwegian parish priest and writer

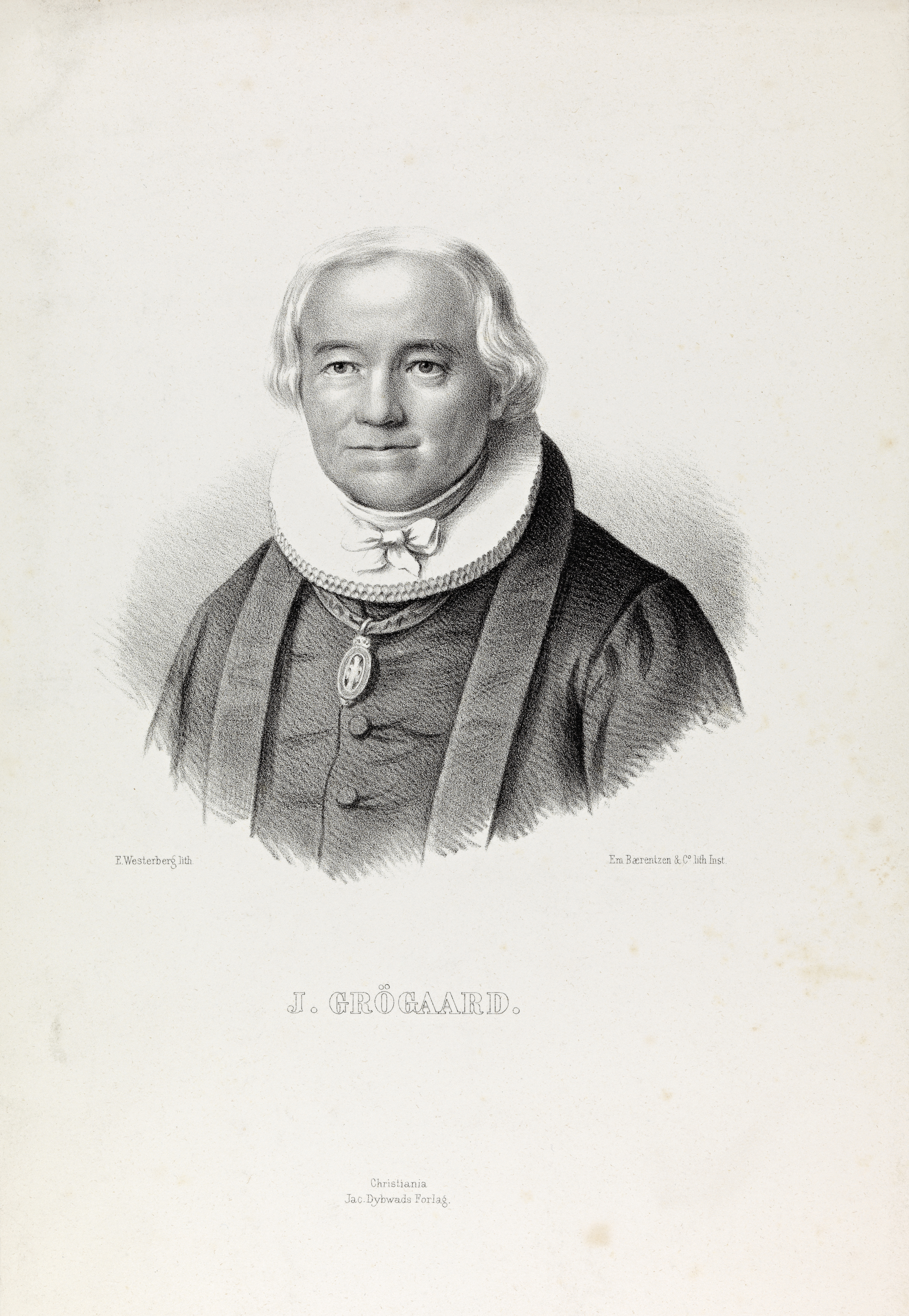
Hans Jacob Grøgaard

Hans Jacob Grøgaard (5 April 1764 – 22 March 1836) was a Norwegian parish priest and writer. He served as a representative at the Norwegian Constituent Assembly in 1814.

== Background ==
Hans Jacob Grøgaard was born in Aasnes in Hedmark county, Norway. At age three, the family moved to Bergen, where his father was sexton at St. Jørgen's Hospital Church (St. Jørgen hospitalkirke). Grøgaard started his education at the Bergen Cathedral School. He studied theology in Copenhagen and earned his theological degree in 1784.

== Career ==
In 1797, he became a chaplain at Øyestad Church in Nedenes county. In 1811, he became vicar at Vestre Moland Church in Nedenes. In 1822, he became pastor at Nykirken in Bergen and in 1832 he was offered the episcopal office in Christiania (now Oslo), but had to decline because of poor health. He published the text book ABC in 1815, and the reader Læsebog for Børn, især i Omgangsskoledistrikterne in 1816. Both were used within schools throughout Norway during much of the 1800s

Hans Jacob Grøgaard represented Nedenes amt (now Aust-Agder) at the Norwegian Constituent Assembly in 1814 at Eidsvoll Manor. He was joined fellow delegates Ole Knudsen Tvedten and Henrik Carstensen. He supported the position of the union party (Unionspartiet

== Related Reading ==
- Holme Jørn (2014) De kom fra alle kanter - Eidsvollsmennene og deres hus (Oslo: Cappelen Damm) ISBN 978-82-02-44564-5
