= Hans Christian Ulrik Midelfart =

Norwegian Lutheran minister

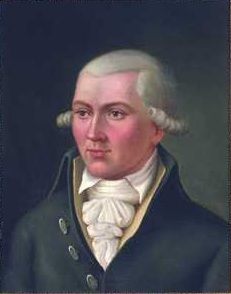
Hans Christian Ulrik Midelfart by P. Meidell

Hans Christian Ulrik Midelfart (22 July 1772 – 1 December 1823) was a Norwegian Lutheran minister who served as a representative at the Norwegian Constitutional Assembly in 1814.

Hans Christian Ulrik Midelfart was born in the Byneset parish in what is now Trondheim Municipality in Trøndelag, Norway. He was the son of a parish priest. He served as minister in the parish of Beitstad in Nordre Trondheim county from 1802 to 1814. He became pastor at Skogn in what is now Levanger Municipality during 1814, and held this office until his death in 1823.

He represented Nordre Trondhjems amt at the Norwegian Constituent Assembly in 1814. He became a member of the Constitutional Committee, and was regarded as belonging to the independence party (Selvstendighetspartiet).
