= Osmund Andersen Lømsland =

Osmund Andersen Lømsland (2 July 1765 – 25 August 1841) was a Norwegian farmer who served as a representative at the Norwegian Constituent Assembly.

Osmund Andersen Lømsland was born at the village of Mosby in Oddernes, a borough in Kristiansand, Norway. He was engaged in farming. In 1806, he bought the farm Lømsland at Tveit in Vest-Agder where he remained throughout his life. About 1790, Osmund Andersen was married with Anna Torstensdatter Lauvsland from the parish of Finsland (1766–1837). The couple had seven children born in the period 1790–1803, of whom only three lived into adulthood.

He was elected to the Norwegian Constituent Assembly in 1814, representing the constituency of Mandals Amt (now Vest-Agder). At the Assembly, he supported the union party (Unionspartiet).
