= Christen Mølbach =

Norwegian politician

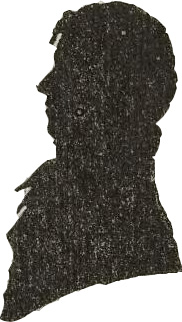
Christen Mølbach

Christen Mølbach (8 November 1766 – 7 July 1834) was a Norwegian merchant who represented Stavanger amt at the Norwegian Constituent Assembly at Eidsvoll in 1814.

Christen (Andersen) Mølbach was born in Kristiansand in Vest-Agder, Norway, the son of Anders Christensen Mølbach (1735, died 1809 in Bergen; merchant) and Andrea Anthonette Kierulff (1733, died 1808 in Bergen). Christen Mølbach established himself as a merchant and official at Egersund in Rogaland, succeeding Hercules Weyer as "sorenskriver" (senior local official) and marrying Weyer's widow, Inger Margrethe Kiærulf, who was also Mølbach's second cousin (date of marriage: January 23, 1797). With this marriage, he acquired considerable wealth. Mølbach also served as both the Danish and Dutch vice-consul in Egersund. The couple lived at Næsgaard, an estate in Egersund. They had no children. Mølbach's sister's children, the Bucks of Hammerfest, succeeded them at Næsgaard In 1814, he represented Stavanger amt (now Rogaland) at the Norwegian Constituent Assembly at Eidsvoll. He generally supported the union party Unionspartiet). Ten years later he was a member of the Parliament of Norway.

== Related Reading ==
- Holme Jørn (2014) De kom fra alle kanter - Eidsvollsmennene og deres hus (Oslo: Cappelen Damm) ISBN 978-82-02-44564-5
