= Georg Burchard Jersin =

Norwegian Lutheran minister

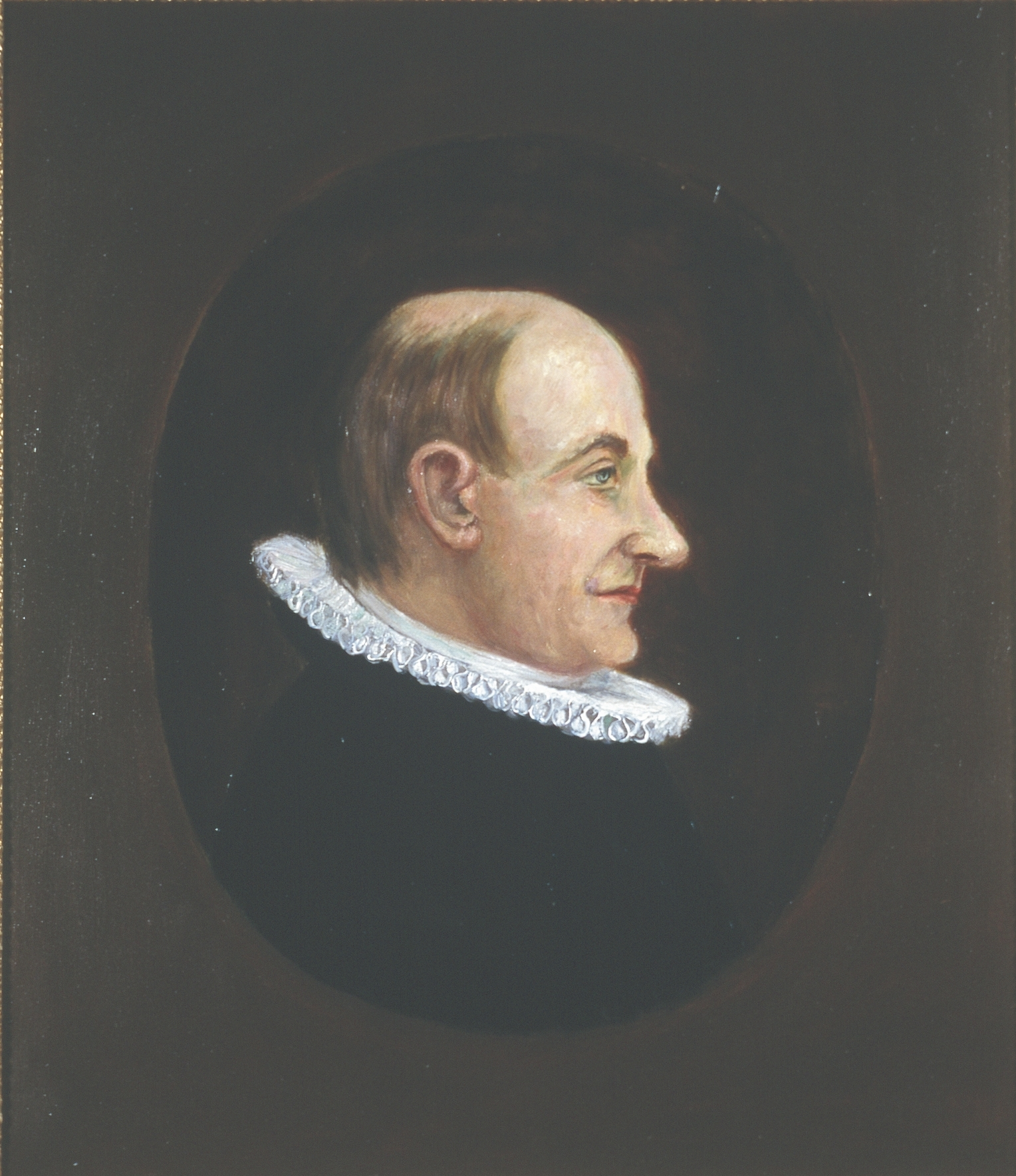
Georg Burchard Jersin

Georg Burchard Jersin (20 January 1767 – 5 October 1827) was a Norwegian Lutheran minister who served as a representative at the Norwegian Constitutional Assembly.

Georg Burchard Jersin was born at Leikanger in Nordre Bergenhus, Norway. He was the son of the parish priest. He attended Bergen Cathedral School in 1786. He was enrolled at the University of Copenhagen where he earned his cand. Theol. in 1793. He was assigned as an assistant parish priest at Voss in Søndre Bergenhus from 1794. He replaced his father as parish priest in 1808.

He represented Søndre Bergenhus amt (now Hordaland) at the Norwegian Constituent Assembly at Eidsvoll Manor in 1814. At the Assembly, Jersin voted with the independence party (Selvstendighetspartiet).
