= 1917 in Norway =

- Centuries: 18th; 19th; 20th; 21st
- Decades: 1890s; 1900s; 1910s; 1920s; 1930s
- See also: List of years in Norway

Events in the year 1917 in Norway.

== Incumbents ==
- Monarch – Haakon VII.

== Events ==
- The Bratsberg Line began rail traffic between Eidanger and Notodden. The line was closed in 2001.
- The Thorunn affair.
- 29 October – Deputy member of Parliament Sara Christie becomes the second woman to take a seat in the Parliament of Norway.

== Popular culture ==
=== Sports ===
- 2 April – Lillestrøm SK is founded after the merger of two local football clubs.
- 19 May – Rosenborg BK is founded.

=== Music ===
- 24 October 1917 – the Norwegian Society of Composers was founded.

=== Literature ===
- The Knut Hamsun novel Markens Grøde Volume 1 & 2 (Growth of the Soil, was published.
- The Olav Duun novel På Lyngsøya (At Heather Island), was published.
- The Mikkjel Fønhus debut novel Skoggangsmand (Outlaw), was published.

== Anniversaries ==
- 14 October – 100 years since the birth of Marcus Thrane.

== Notable births ==
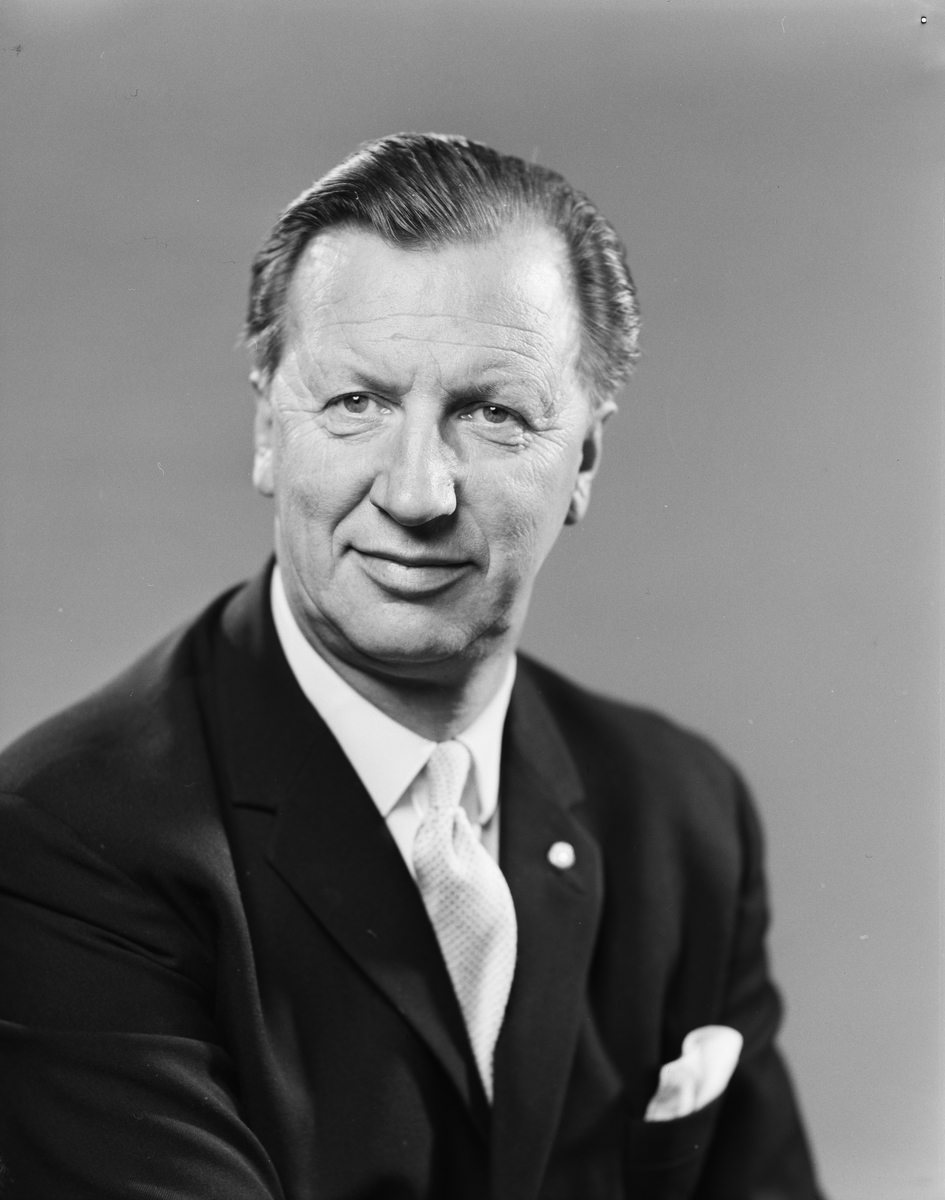
Tor Aspengren

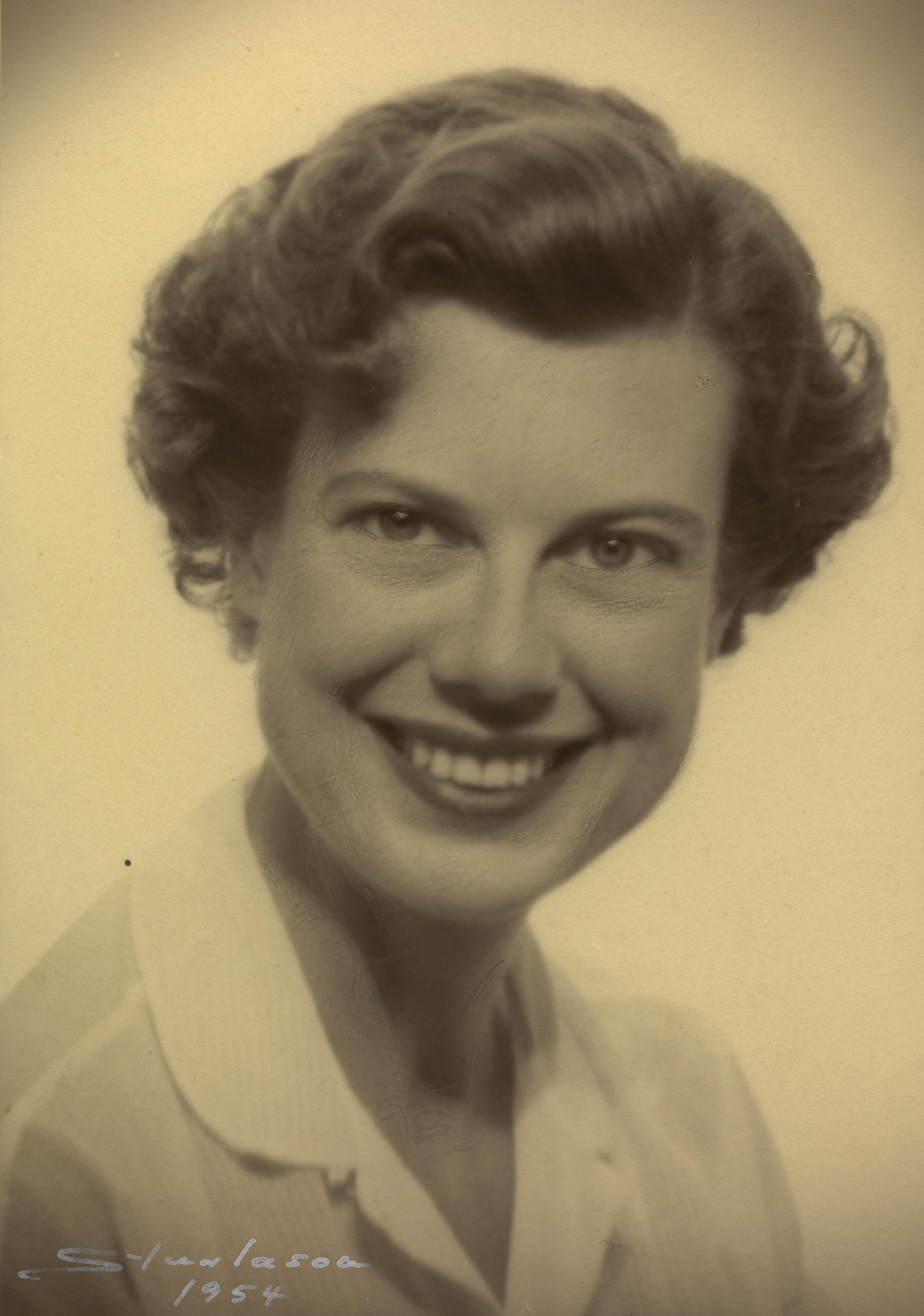
Ebba Haslund

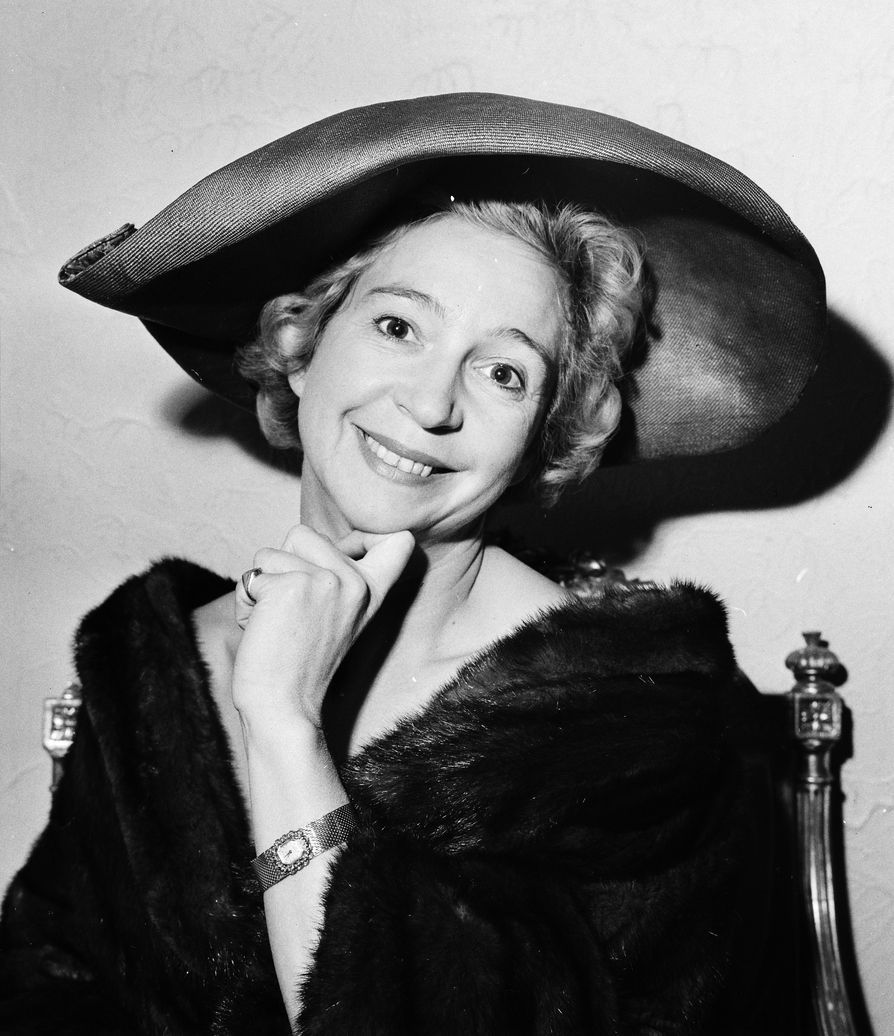
Wenche Foss

- 5 January – Bernt Bjørkø, painter (died 1992)
- 15 January – Hampus Huldt-Nystrøm, pianist and musicologist (died 1995)
- 19 January – Arnfinn Kvithyll, politician (died 2002)
- 20 January – Gunnar Bøe, economist and politician (died 1989)
- 21 January – Kjeld Rasmussen, sculptor (died 1999)
- 24 January – Alf Malland, actor (died 1997)
- 28 January – Eivind Erichsen, economist and civil servant (died 2005)
- 1 February – Tor Aspengren, trade unionist (died 2004)
- 9 February – Ada Madssen, sculptor (died 2009)
- 15 February – Fredrik Mellbye, physician (died 1999)
- 15 February – Torolf Smedvig, ship-owner (died 1977)
- 18 February – Eva Gustavson, singer (died 2009)
- 19 February – Karl Trasti, politician (died 1976)
- 23 February – Erling Sverdrup, statistician (died 1994)
- 2 March – Haakon Tranberg, sprinter (died 1991)
- 4 March – Georg Kristiansen, military officer and diplomat (died 2003)
- 6 March – Paul Svarstad, politician (died 1998)
- 8 March – Harald Skjervold, agronomer (died 1995)
- 18 March – Rita Drangsholt, singer (died 2012).
- 21 March – Egil Weiglin, painter (died 1997)
- 26 March – Idar Ingebrigtsen, painter (died 2004)
- 27 March – Leif Holbæk-Hanssen, economist (died 1991)
- 2 April – Reidar Myhre, educationalist (died 2005)
- 6 April – Tit Mohr, artist (died 2008)
- 9 April – Ole Jacob Bangstad, major general and sports official (died 2010)
- 10 April – Fanny Natvig, textile artist (died 1970)
- 11 April – Bjørn Cook, wrestler (died 2003)
- 20 April – Eva Prytz, singer (died 1987)
- 26 April – Liv Hassel, textile artist (died 1989)
- 1 May – Aud Gustad, politician (died 2000)
- 2 May – Sverre Hartmann, historian (died 2003)
- 5 May – Aage Eriksen, wrestler (died 1998)
- 5 May – Lauritz Opstad, museum director (died 2003)
- 12 May – Johan Berg, military officer (died 1981)
- 15 May – Jan Didriksen, jurist (died 1989)
- 15 May – Daniel Haakonsen, literary historian (died 1989)
- 15 May – Guthorm Kavli, art historian (died 1995)
- 15 May – Harald Risberg, painter (died 1996)
- 16 May – Arne Røgden, bobsledder (died 2002)
- 17 May – Ragnvald Winjum, jurist and politician (died 1965)
- 25 May – Brynjulv Sjetne, politician (died 1976)
- 2 June – Sverre Bratland, military leader (died 2002)
- 13 June – Peter Krag Helland-Hansen, architect (died 1984)
- 14 June – Atle Selberg, mathematician (died 2007)
- 15 June – Einfrid Perstølen, psychiatrist and Nynorsk proponent (died 2017)
- 16 June – Odd Solumsmoen, writer (died 1986)
- 19 June – Karl Victor Hall, physician (died 2001)
- 27 June – Wilhelm Mohr, aviator (died 2016)
- 28 June – Reidar Johan Berle, illustrator (died 1997)
- 28 June – Grete Prytz Kittelsen, designer (died 2010)
- 1 July – Milada Blekastad, writer and literary historian (died 2003; born in Prague)
- 3 July – Brita Collett Paus, humanitarian leader (died 1998)
- 12 July – Erling Erland, politician (died 1988)
- 15 July – Reidar Liaklev, speed skater (died 2006)
- 18 July – Harald Nikolai Brøvig, politician (died 2010)
- 21 July – Jon Ekeland, sculptor (died 1986)
- 22 July – Lothar Lindtner, actor (died 2005)
- 22 July – Torbjørn Navelsaker, television engineer (died 1976)
- 23 July – Knut Brynildsen, footballer (died 1986)
- 24 July – Gudmund Harlem, politician (died 1988)
- 24 July – Simon Slåttvik, skier (died 2001)
- 27 July – Guy Krohg, painter, illustrator and scenographer (died 2002).
- 28 July – Gunnar Haarberg, television presenter (died 2009)
- 2 August – Andreas Grimsø, politician (died 2004)
- 4 August – Torvald Moseid, textile artist (died 2000)
- 12 August – Ebba Haslund, writer and politician (died 2009; born in the US)
- 13 August – Lulla Einrid Fossland, politician (died 2009)
- 14 August – Anton Helmersberg, painter (died 1993)
- 17 August – Kåre Rodahl, physician (died 2008)
- 26 August – Gisle Straume, actor (died 1988)
- 3 September – Bjarne Hanssen, politician (died 2014)
- 3 September – Oddmund Ljone, writer (died 1985)
- 5 September – Rolf Vik, zoologist (died 1999)
- 9 September – Maj Sønstevold, composer (died 1996; born in Sweden)
- 14 September – Sigurd Aalefjær, engineer (died 1991; born in the US)
- 23 September – Knut Haugland, resistance fighter and explorer (died 2009)
- 26 September – Åslaug Linge Sunde, politician (died 2006)
- 3 October – Richard Fredrik Kjelstrup, clarinetist (died 1996)
- 3 October – Odd Lundberg, speed skater (died 1983)
- 7 October – Godtfred Holmvang, decathlete and skier (died 2006)
- 16 October – Aasmund Brynildsen, writer (died 1974)
- 22 October – Kathrine Johnsen, radio presenter (died 2002)
- 25 October – Torbjørn Afdal, furniture designer (died 1999)
- 26 October – Kaare Steel Groos, politician (died 1994)
- 5 November – Jens Evensen, lawyer, judge and politician (died 2004)
- 8 November – Rolf Solem, police chief (died 2011)
- 12 November – Arne Taraldsen, illustrator (died 1989)
- 18 November – Ragnar Kvam, journalist, novelist, translator and literary critic (died 2006)
- 29 November – Nicolai Johansen, football administrator (died 1999)
- 29 November – Annalise Convad, painter (died 2011; born in Denmark)
- 30 November – Arne Konrad Eldegard, banker and politician (died 2018)
- 5 December – Wenche Foss, actress (died 2011)
- 8 December – Hans Holtedahl, geologist (died 2001)
- 13 December – Jan Baalsrud, resistance member (died 1988)
- 13 December – Werner Christie, aviator (died 2004)
- 15 December – Gregers Gram, resistance member (died 1944)
- 19 December – Olaf Dufseth, skier (died 2009)
- 22 December – Hans Brimi, folk musician (died 1998)
- 23 December – Eivind Sværen, shot putter (died 1986)
- 24 December – Frithjof Sælen, writer (died 2004)

=== Full date missing ===
- Odd Hovdenak, civil servant (died 1982)
- Olav Harald Jensen, economist (died 1991)
- Tor Ørvig, paleontologist (died 1994)

== Notable deaths ==
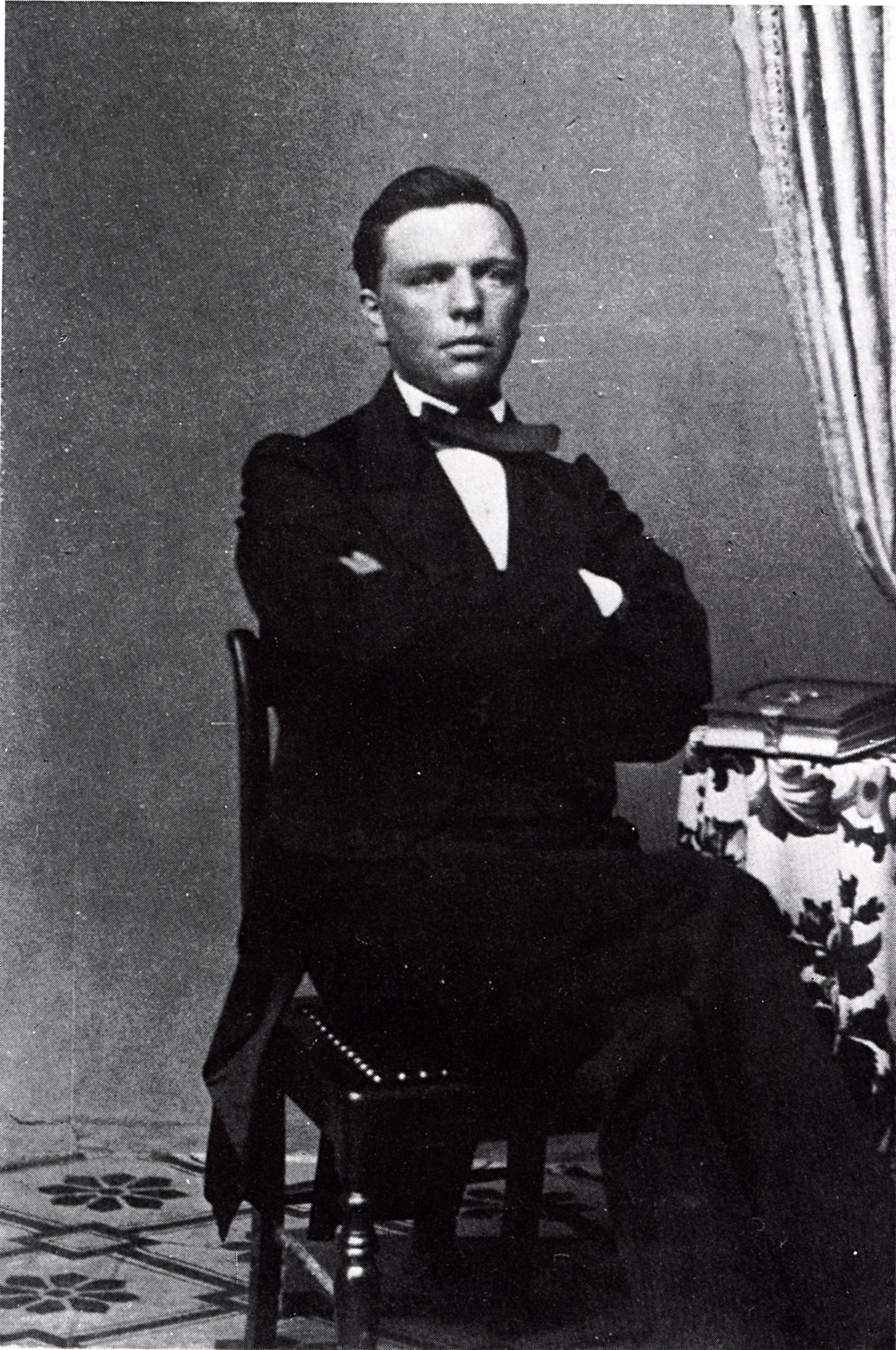
Georg Andreas Bull

- 7 January – Jørgen Alexander Knudtzon, linguist (born 1854)
- 26 January – Oluf Iversen, politician (born 1847)
- 1 February – Georg Andreas Bull, architect and chief building inspector (born 1829)
- 6 March – Lorentz Dietrichson, art historian (born 1834)
- 15 March – Kristofer Randers, writer (born 1851)
- 17 March – Cæsar Peter Møller Boeck, dermatologist (born 1845)
- 11 April – Rasmus Høydahl Ohme, marketer (born 1865)
- 27 April – Christen Brun, bishop (born 1846)
- 8 May – Gustaf Aspelin, businessperson (born 1857, died in Sweden)
- 9 May – Haagen Krog Steffens, historian, archivist and genealogist (born 1873)
- 11 May – Andreas Bloch, caricaturist (born 1860)
- 16 May – Ole Olsen Malm, physician, veterinarian, civil servant and politician (b. 1854).
- 19 May – Jørgen Brunchorst, politician (born 1862; died in Italy)
- 15 June – Kristian Birkeland, scientist (born 1867; died in Japan)
- 18 June – Oscar Ambrosius Castberg, painter and sculptor (born 1846)
- 19 June – Johan Gerhard Theodor Ameln, politician (born 1838)
- 1 July – Olaus Arvesen, educator and politician (born 1830)
- 30 July – Hans Konrad Foosnæs, educator and politician (born 1846)
- 4 August – Kristian Birch-Reichenwald Aars, academic (born 1868)
- 11 September – Thora Hansson, actress and theatre director (born 1848)
- 20 September – Einar Sundt, businessman, writer and publisher (born 1854).
- 10 October – Johannes Ylvisaker, theologian (born 1845; died in the US)
- 11 October – Carl Frithjof Smith, painter (born 1859; died in Germany)
- 25 October – Johannes Grimelund, painter (born 1842; died in France)
- 17 November – Kristofer Janson, author (born 1841; died in Denmark)
- 3 December – Sigrid Bølling, painter (born 1852; died in Denmark)
- 4 December – Aasmund Halvorsen Vinje, politician (born 1851)
- 21 December – Halvor Emil Heyerdahl, engineer (born 1840)

=== Full date missing ===
- Anders Sveaas, businessperson and consul (born 1840)
- Georg August Thilesen, politician (born 1837)
