= 1919 in Norway =

- Centuries: 18th; 19th; 20th; 21st
- Decades: 1890s; 1900s; 1910s; 1920s; 1930s
- See also: List of years in Norway

Events in the year 1919 in Norway.

== Incumbents ==
- Monarch – Haakon VII.

== Events ==
- 5–6 October - 1919 Norwegian prohibition referendum.
- Municipal and county elections are held throughout the country.
- Production of zinc begins in Glomfjord at the state-owned industrial plant.

== Popular culture ==
=== Sports ===
- Helge Løvland, track and field athlete and gymnast; becomes the second to receive the Egebergs Ærespris, an award presented to Norwegian athletes who excel at two (or more) different sports.

=== Literature ===
- The Olav Duun novel I Blinda (The Blind Man) from the work Juvikfolket (The People of Juvik, 1918–23), was published.

== Births ==
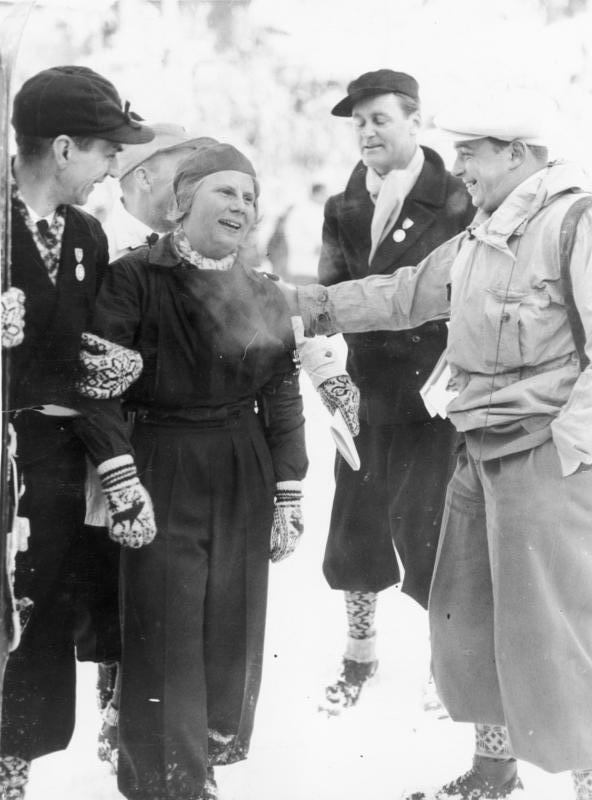
Laila Schou Nilsen won the downhill event at the 1936 Olympics.

=== January to March ===
- 14 January – Harry Hansen, politician (died 2003)
- 17 January – Per Bergsland, Royal Air Force pilot and prisoner of war (died 1992)
- 31 January – Claus Helberg, resistance fighter and mountain guide (died 2003)
- 4 February – Marta Schumann, writer (died 1994).
- 11 February – Erland Steenberg, politician (died 2009)
- 15 February – Asbjørn Herteig, archeologist (died 2006).
- 2 March – Carl Mortensen, sailor and Olympic silver medallist (died 2005)
- 5 March – Helge Seip, politician (died 2004)
- 17 March – Erik Rinde, jurist and pioneer of social sciences in Norway (died 1994)
- 18 March – Laila Schou Nilsen, speed skater, alpine skier and tennis player (died 1998)

=== April to June ===
- 1 April – Olav Brænden, pharmacist (died 1989)
- 13 April – Nils Reinhardt Christensen, film director and screenwriter (died 1990)
- 14 April – Bjarne Berg-Sæther, politician (died 2009)
- 19 April – Asbjørn Lillås, politician (died 1983)
- 21 April – Kristian Fougner, engineer and resistance member (died 2012)
- 25 April – Finn Helgesen, speed skater and Olympic gold medallist (died 2011)
- 6 May – Nils Uhlin Hansen, long jumper and resistance member (died 1945)
- 18 May – Ottar Landfald, politician (died 2009)
- 24 May – Einar Brusevold, politician (died 2005).
- 6 June – Rita Haugerud, politician (died 2014)
- 29 June – Johannes Heggland, author and politician (died 2008)

=== July to September ===
- 14 July – Arnold Dyrdahl, bobsledder (died 1973)
- 3 August – Thor Gystad, politician (died 2007)
- 3 August – Ola M. Hestenes, politician (died 2008)
- 4 August – Engly Lie, politician (died 2001)
- 9 August – Liv Andersen, politician (died 1997)
- 13 August – Børre Falkum-Hansen, sailor and Olympic silver medalist (died 2006)
- 25 August – Alf Nordhus, barrister (died 1997)
- 27 August – Bjørn Rørholt, engineer, military officer and resistance member (died 1993).
- 30 August – Joachim Rønneberg, resistance fighter and broadcaster (died 2018)
- 15 September – Eilert Dahl, Nordic skier (died 2004)
- 30 September – Olav O. Nomeland, politician (died 1986)

=== October to December ===
- 26 October – Knut Andreas Knudsen, politician (died 2001)
- 4 November – Per Olav Baarnaas, race walker (died 2004).
- 29 November – Aksel Fossen, politician (died 2009)
- 11 December – Elsa Skjerven, politician and minister (died 2005)
- 22 December – Bjarne Orten, civil servant (died 2011)
- 27 December – Gunnar Alf Larsen, politician (died 2003)

=== Full date unknown ===
- Odd Chr. Gøthe, civil servant and politician (died 2002)
- Reidar Haaland, police officer and collaborator, executed (died 1945)
- Finn Hødnebø, philologist (died 2007)
- Odd Narud, businessperson (died 2000)
- Olav Nordrå, writer (died 1994)
- Asbjørn Ruud, ski jumper and World Champion (died 1986)
- Aage Samuelsen, evangelist, singer and composer (died 1987)
- Victor Sparre, visual artist (died 2008)
- Jakob Sverdrup, historian (died 1997)

== Deaths ==
- 12 January – Carl Wilhelm Bøckmann Barth, painter (born 1847).
- 25 February – Gulbrand Hagen, newspaper editor and writer in America (born 1864)
- 4 March – Sigurd Mathisen, speed skater and world champion (born 1884)
- 16 April – Anders Nicolai Kiær, statistician (born 1838)
- 22 May – Jens Ludvig Andersen Aars, politician (born 1852)
- 12 June – Alf Collett, writer (born 1844)
- 29 June – Ole Falck Ebbell, architect (born 1839)
- 12 August – Oscar Sigvald Julius Strugstad, politician and Minister (born 1851)
- 22 October – Cathinka Guldberg, Norway's first nurse (born 1840)
