= 1847 in Norway =

- Centuries: 17th; 18th; 19th; 20th; 21st
- Decades: 1820s; 1830s; 1840s; 1850s; 1860s
- See also: 1847 in Sweden; List of years in Norway

Events in the year 1847 in Norway.

== Incumbents ==
- Monarch: Oscar I.
- First Minister: Nicolai Krog

== Events ==
- 21 August - The Order of St. Olav was instituted by King Oscar I.
- November - The piano manufacturer Brødrene Hals was founded.
- The 1847 Norwegian parliamentary election.

== Births ==
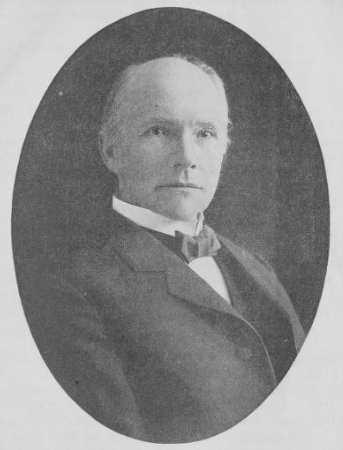
Karl Lous

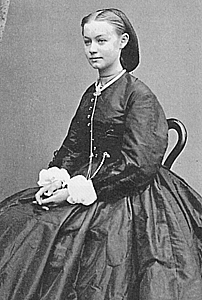
Agathe Backer Grøndahl

- 11 April – Ebbe Carsten Horneman Hertzberg, politician (d.1912).
- 14 April – Karl Lous, barrister (d. 1928).
- 17 April – Just Bing Ebbesen, priest and politician (d.1929)
- 20 June – Gina Krog, suffragist (died 1916).
- 31 July – Johan Kristian Skougaard, military officer and politician (d.1925)
- 20 October –Frits Thaulow, painter (d.1906)
- 26 October – Helge A. Haugan – Norwegian-American banking executive (d.1909 in USA)
- 9 November – Carl Wilhelm Bøckmann Barth, artist (d. 1919).
- 18 November – Oluf Iversen, politician (d.1917)
- 1 December – Agathe Backer Grøndahl, pianist and composer (d.1907).
- 15 December – Rolf Andvord, shipowner and consul (d. 1906)
- 26 December – Hans Christian Albert Hansen, politician (d.1925)

== Deaths ==
- 16 January – Ole Devegge, librarian, numismatist and collector (b.1772)

=== Full date unknown ===
- Knut Andreas Pettersen Agersborg, politician (b.1765)
- Paulus Flood, merchant and politician (b.1804)
