= Aslaug (given name) =

Norwegian feminine given name

- Gender: unisex
- Language: Old Norse

Origin
- Origin: Scandinavia
- Meaning: "god", "betrothed woman"

Other names
- See also: Asløg, Aslőg, Åslög

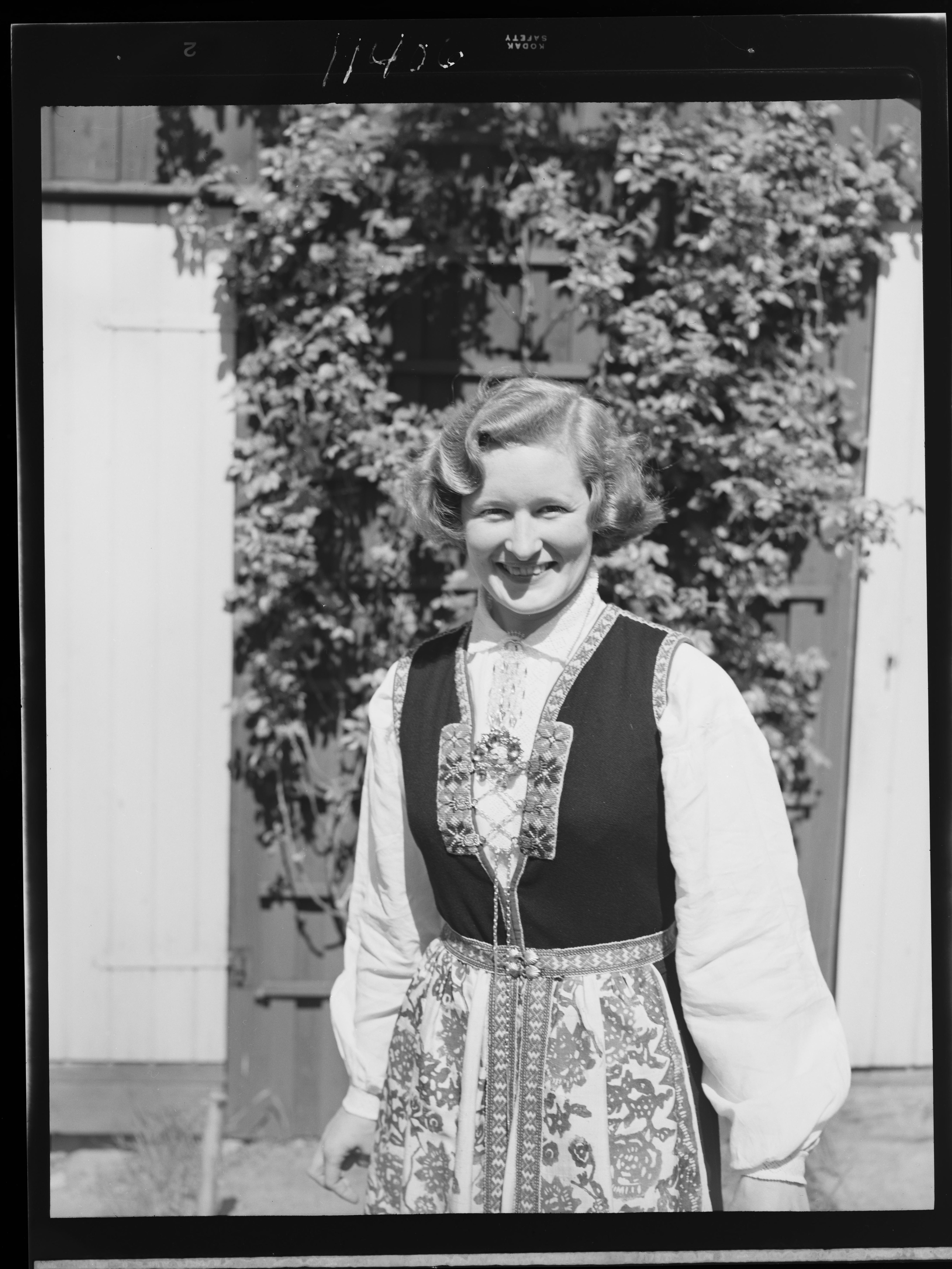
Aslaug Huseklepp, Norwegian wife of rehabilitation borrower, in Wisconsin

Aslaug is a Norwegian given name, derived from Old Norse prefix áss-, meaning "god", and suffix -laug, possible meaning "betrothed woman". The Swedish cognate is Aslög; the Danish cognate is Asløg. Aslaug is uncommon as a surname. People with the name Aslaug include:

- Aslaug, a queen of Scandinavian mythology
- Aslaug Dahl (born 1949), Norwegian, Olympic cross-country skier
- Åslaug Grinde (1931–2019), Norwegian politician
- Åslaug Haga (born 1959), Norwegian politician
- Åslaug Linge Sunde (1917–2006), Norwegian politician
