= 1918 in Norway =

- Centuries: 18th; 19th; 20th; 21st
- Decades: 1890s; 1900s; 1910s; 1920s; 1930s
- See also: List of years in Norway

Events in the year 1918 in Norway.

== Incumbents ==
- Monarch – Haakon VII.

== Events ==
- The town of Svolvær is founded.
- Norsk Hydro's artificial fertilizer production at Glomfjord is bought by the Norwegian government. In 1947 it is leased back to Hydro. This activity is today Yara International.
- The 1918 Parliamentary election takes place.

== Popular culture ==
=== Sports ===
- Gunnar Andersen, international soccer player and ski jumper, becomes the first to receive the Egebergs Ærespris, an award presented to Norwegian athletes who excel at two (or more) different sports.

=== Literature ===
- The Olav Duun novel Juvikingar (The Trough of the Waves) from the work Juvikfolket (The People of Juvik, 1918–23), was published.
- The Knut Hamsund article collection Sproget i Fare (The language in Danger), was published.

== Notable births ==
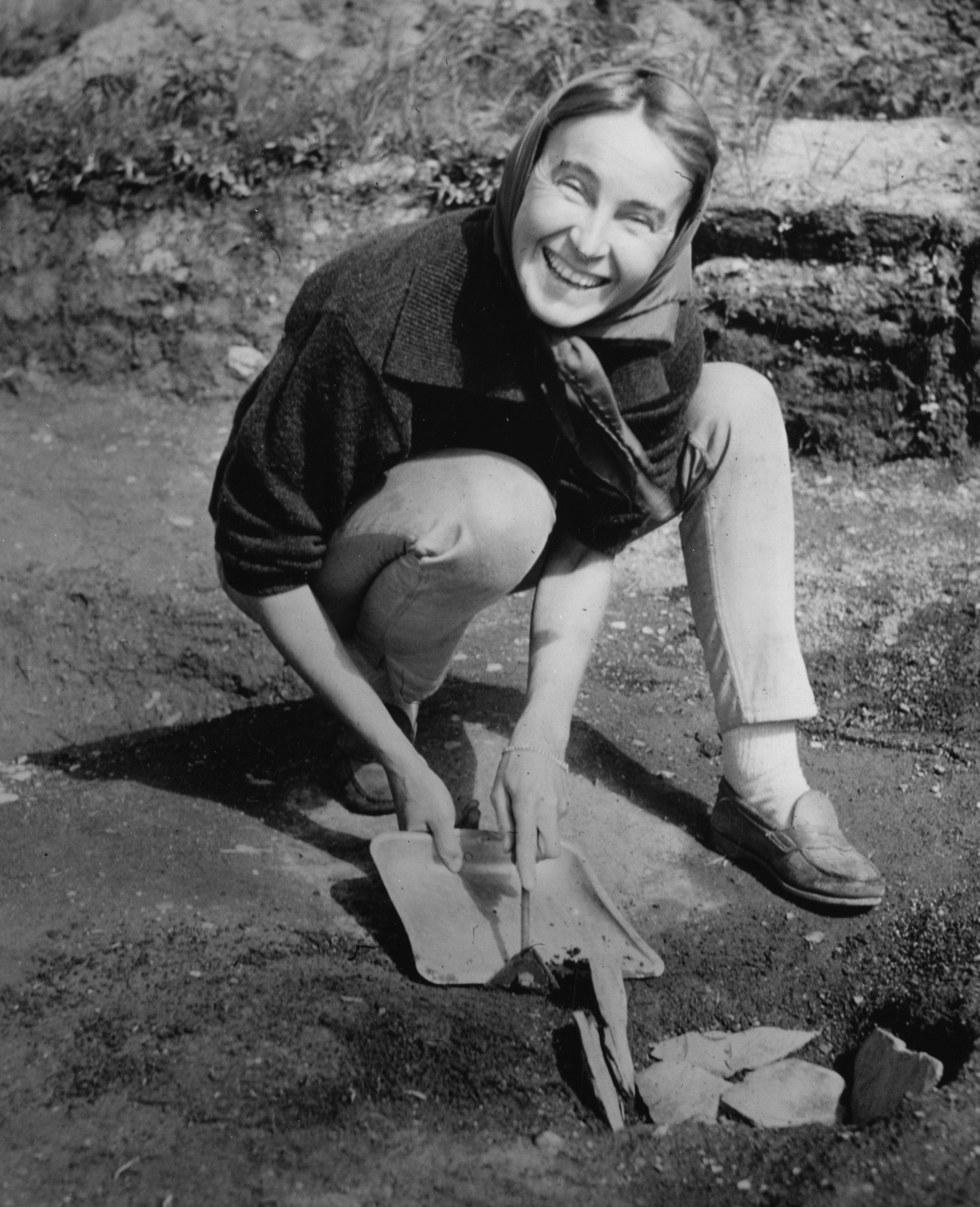
Anne Stine Ingstad

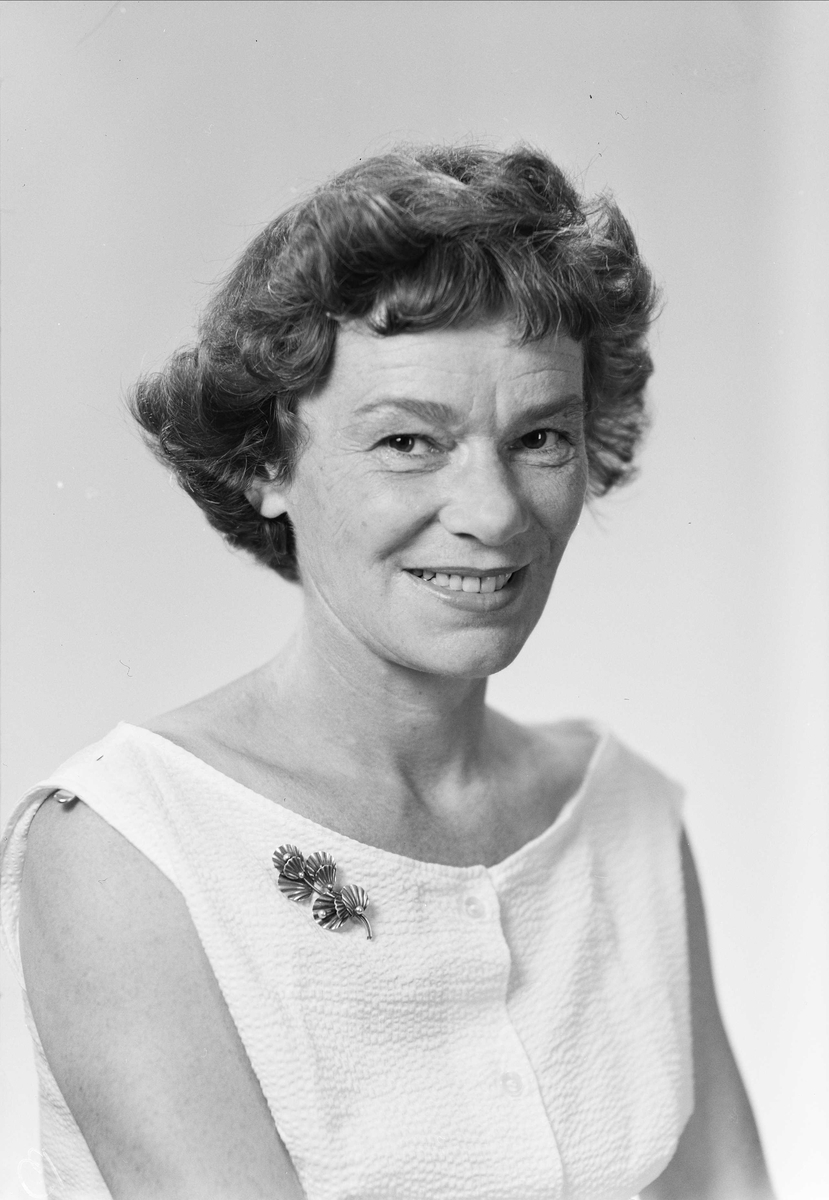
Berit Brænne

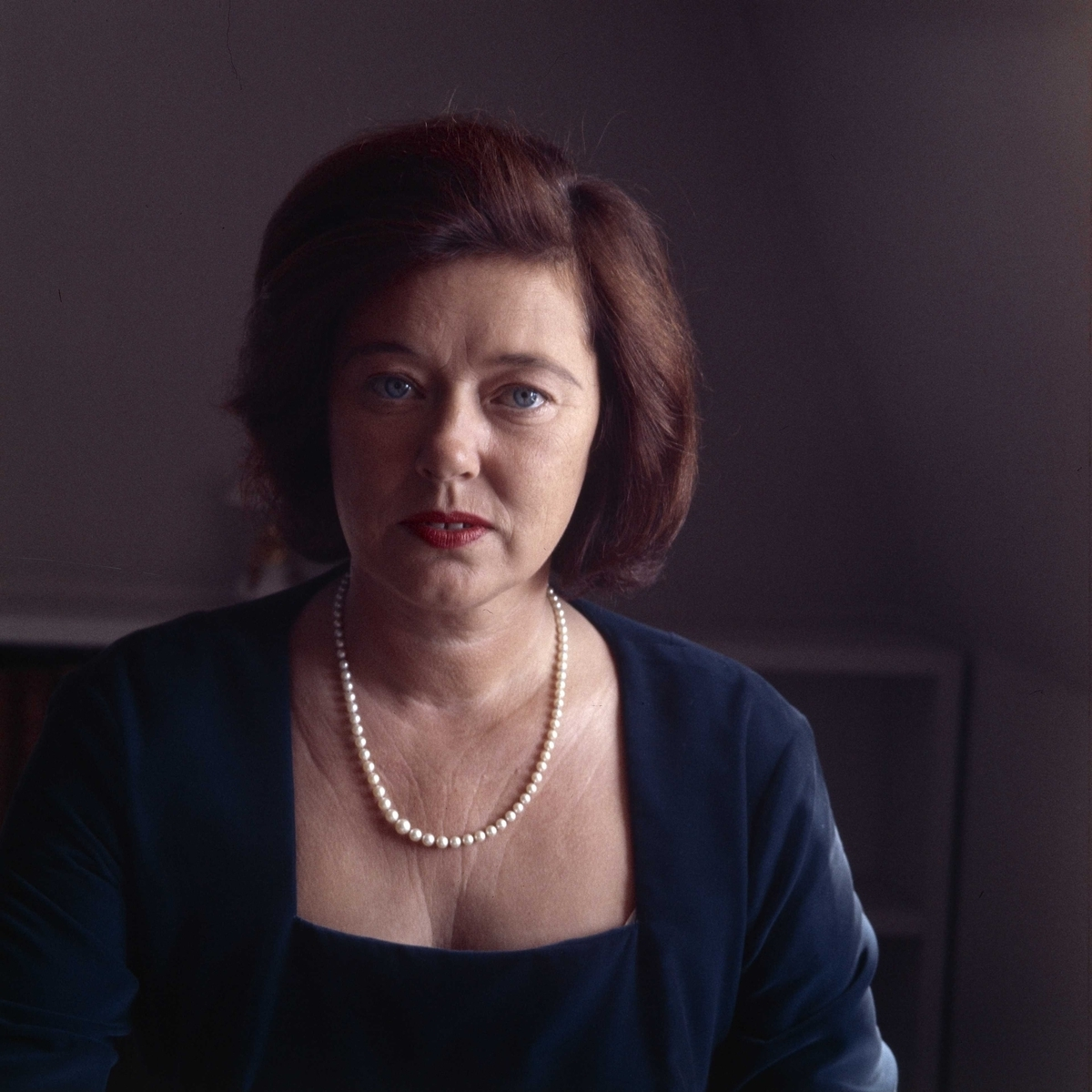
Solveig Christov

- 2 January – Odd Vattekar, politician (died 1992)
- 11 January – Gunnar Sønsteby, resistance fighter, the most highly decorated person in Norway (died 2012)
- 27 January – Lars Ulgenes, shot putter (died 2005)
- 30 January – André Bjerke, writer and poet (died 1985)
- 1 February – Elsa Rastad Bråten, politician (died 1999)
- 11 February – Anne Stine Ingstad, archaeologist (died 1997)
- 16 February – Karsten Konow, sailor and Olympic silver medallist (died 1943)
- 20 March – Oddvar Berrefjord, jurist, politician and Minister (died 1999)
- 14 April – Margit Tøsdal, politician (died 1993)
- 6 May – Eva Kolstad, politician and Minister (died 1999)
- 19 May – Olav Bø, folklorist (died 1998)
- 25 May – Peder Lunde, sailor and Olympic silver medallist (died 2009)
- 25 May – Fredrik Kayser, resistance fighter (died 2009)
- 10 June – Gerd Kirste, politician (died 2014)
- 15 June – Fartein Valen-Sendstad, historian and museologist (died 1984).
- 21 June – Kasper Idland, resistance member (died 1968)
- 2 July – Odd Sagør, politician and Minister (died 1993)
- 4 July – Rolf Søder, actor (died 1998)
- 9 July – Tor Tank-Nielsen, businessperson (died 2010)
- 12 July – Kåre Stokkeland, politician (died 1985)
- 2 August – Gunvald Tomstad, resistance fighter (died 1970)
- 13 August – Jo Giæver Tenfjord, librarian, educator, children's writer and translator (died 2007).
- 18 August – Per Hafslund, zoologist, educator and broadcasting person (died 1990)
- 19 August – Bjørn Egge, military officer (died 2007)
- 8 September – Kjølv Egeland, politician (died 1999)
- 18 September – Berit Brænne, actress and children's writer (died 1976)
- 29 September – Aage Myhrvold, cyclist (died 1987).
- 8 October – Halfdan Hegtun, radio personality, comedian, writer and politician (died 2012)
- 15 October – Rolf Schjerven, politician (died 1978)
- 27 October – Jens-Anton Poulsson, military officer (died 2010)
- 29 October – Solveig Christov, writer (died 1984).
- 9 November – Aslaug Fredriksen, politician (died 2000)
- 9 November – Sverre Granlund, commando (died 1943)
- 13 November – Karl Aasland, politician (died 1982)
- 16 November – Finn Ludt, pianist, composer and music critic (died 1992)
- 24 November – Torstein Grythe, founder and conductor of the Sølvguttene boys choir (died 2009)
- 8 December – Hans Børli, poet and writer (died 1989)
- 8 December – Carsten Byhring, actor (died 1990)
- 22 December – Knut Løfsnes, politician (died 1996).

=== Full date unknown ===
- Otto Chr. Bastiansen, physicist and chemist (died 1995)
- Kåre Berven Fjeldsaa, ceramics designer (died 1991)
- Kari Nyquist, ceramicist (died 2011)
- Einar Skinnarland, resistance fighter (died 2002)

== Notable deaths ==
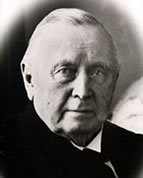
Hans Mustad

- 26 February – Otto Jensen, bishop, politician and Minister (born 1856)
- 25 August – Karl Haagensen, gymnast and Olympic gold medallist (born 1871)

=== Full date unknown ===
- Anders Heyerdahl, violinist, composer and folk music collector (born 1832)
- Hans Mustad, businessperson (born 1837)
- Dan Weggeland, artist (born 1827)
