= Nordhus =

Nordhus is a Norwegian surname. Notable people with the surname include:

- Alf Nordhus (1919–1997), Norwegian barrister
- Kjetil Nordhus (born 1975), Norwegian singer, composer, and music producer
- Paula Nordhus (1935–1994), Norwegian politician
