= Eldegard =

Eldegard is a surname. Notable people with the surname include:

- Arne Konrad Eldegard (1917–2018), Norwegian banker and politician
- Gunvor Eldegard (born 1963), Norwegian politician
- Sigurd Eldegard (1866–1950), Norwegian actor, playwright, and theatre director
