= Lulla =

Lulla can refer to:

- Lullaby, a kind of song
- Lulla, Hungary, a village
- Lulla Einrid Fossland, Norwegian politician
- Engelbert Lulla (1929–2022), Austrian canoe sprinter
- Kishore Lulla, Indian businessman
- Krishika Lulla, Indian film producer
- Neeta Lulla, Indian costume designer and fashion stylist
