= Lærdal =

Lærdal may refer to:

== Places ==
- Lærdal Municipality, a municipality in Vestland county, Norway
- Lærdal, or Lærdalsøyri, a village within Lærdal Municipality in Vestland county, Norway

== Other ==
- Laerdal, a multinational company based in Norway
- Lærdal Tunnel, a road tunnel in Vestland county, Norway
- Lærdal Sparebank, a defunct bank based in Lærdal, Norway
