= Agersborg =

Agersborg is a Norwegian surname. Notable people with the surname include:

- Henrik Agersborg (1872–1942), Norwegian sailor
- Knut Andreas Pettersen Agersborg (1765–1847), Norwegian politician
