= Peder P. Næsheim =

Norwegian politician

Peder P. Næsheim (7 October 1925 – 25 November 1969) was a Norwegian politician for the Labour Party.

He was elected to the Norwegian Parliament from Rogaland in 1965, and was re-elected on one occasion. Shortly after the start of his second term, however, he died and was replaced by Lulla Einrid Fossland.

Næsheim was born in Stavanger and involved in local politics in Stavanger between 1955 and 1967. He was also deputy mayor of Rogaland county council between 1963 and 1968.
