= After first Communion =

1892 oil on canvas by Carl Frithjof Smith

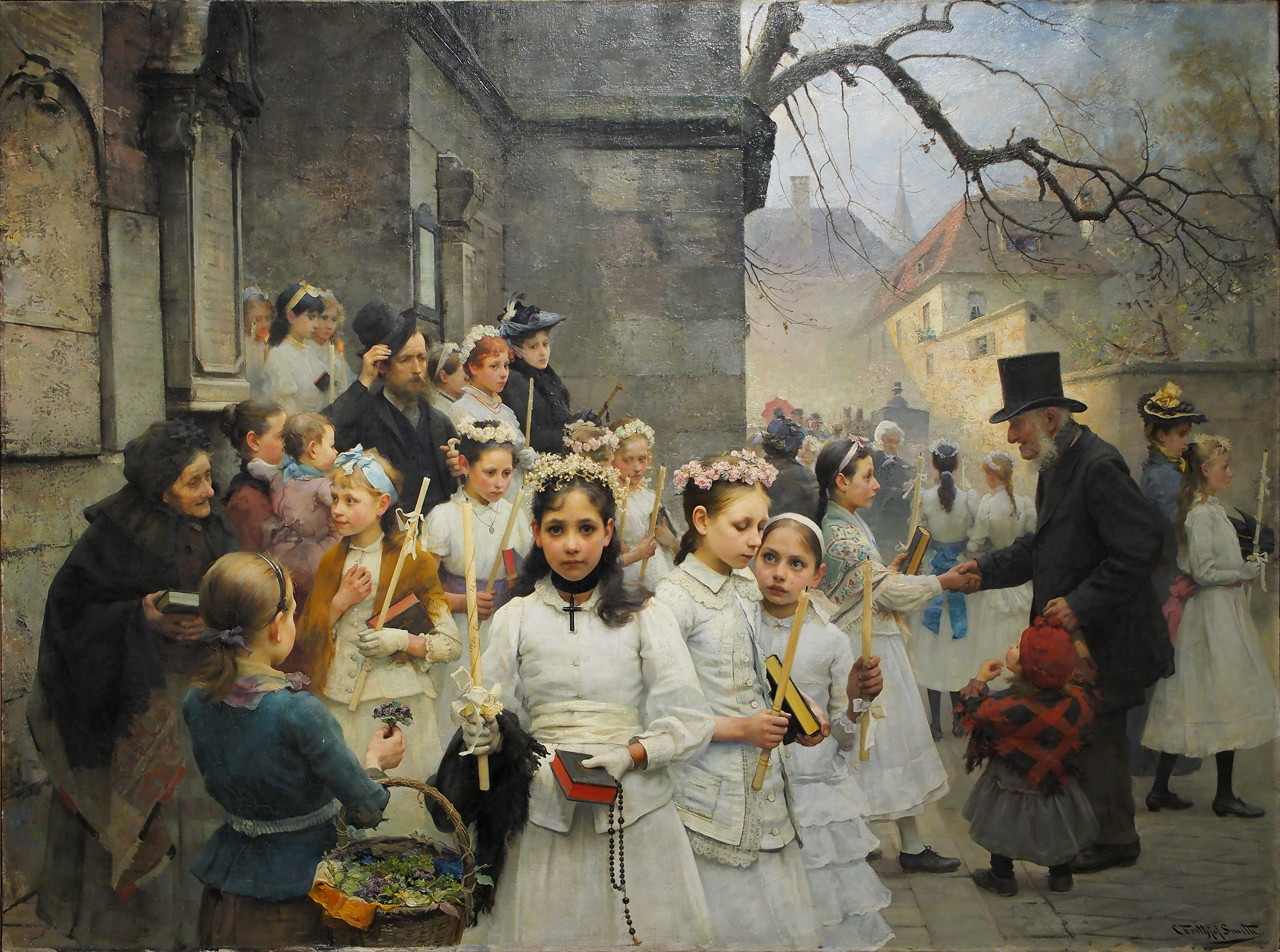
- Artist: Carl Frithjof Smith
- Year: 1892
- Medium: Oil on canvas
- Dimensions: 136.5 cm × 183 cm (53.7 in × 72 in)
- Location: Museo Revoltella; Trieste, Italy

After first Communion is an 1892 painting by the Norwegian artist Carl Frithjof Smith. It was purchased in that same year at the International Art Exhibition in the Royal Glass Palace in Munich by the Museo Revoltella of Trieste, where it is hanging now

== Overview ==
It is the late 1800's. A group of people leave the church, mostly young girls after their first communion. The girls wear white dresses; on the contrary, the older figures are in dark tones, emphasizing the contrast between youth and old age.

While most people are involved with each other, a girl in the foreground, painted with almost “photographic” definition, is staring intensely at the viewer, breaking the fourth wall. This contrast creates a disconcerting effect that is the distinguishing feature of the painting.

== In-depth ==
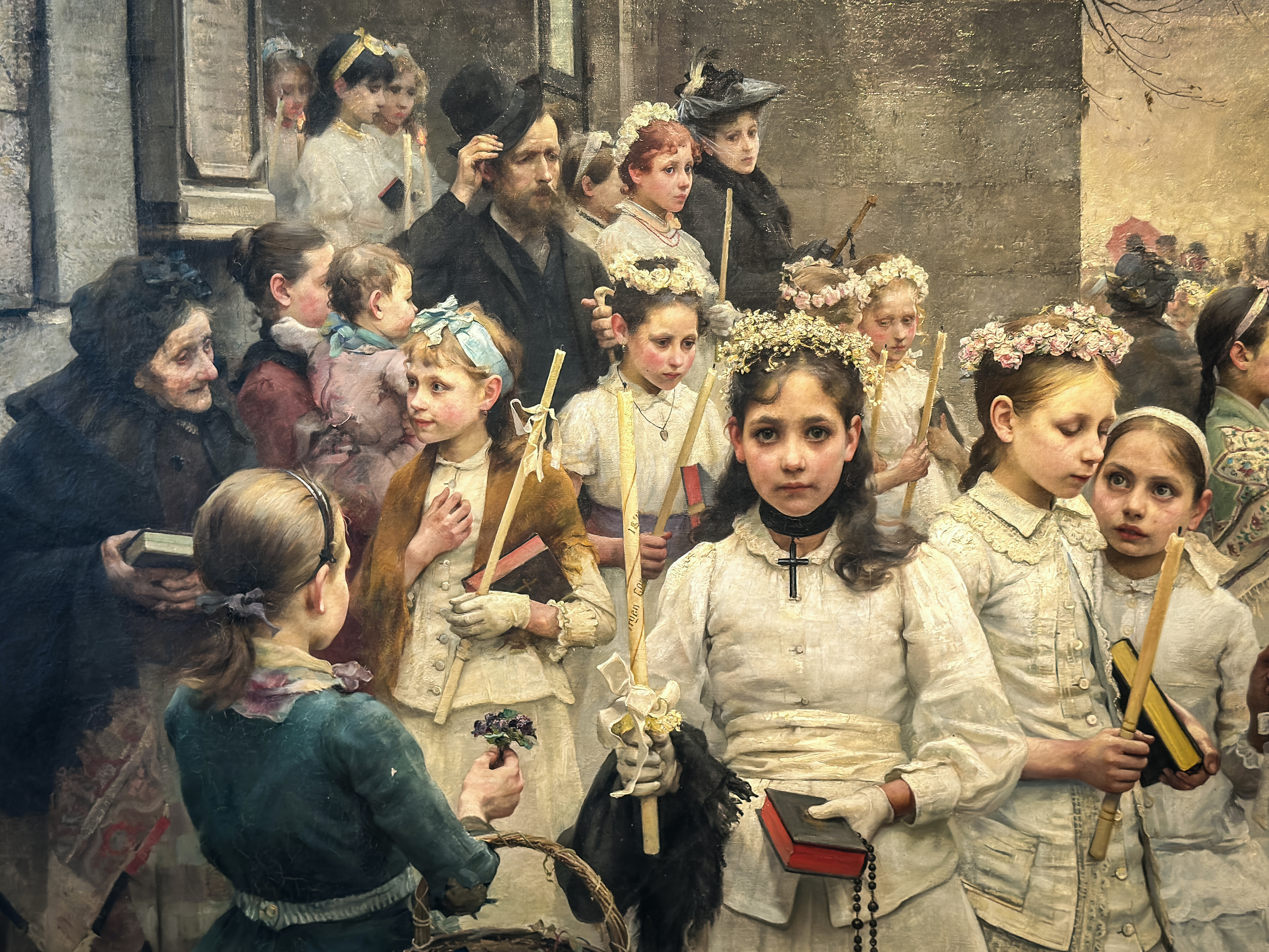

Late 19th century. On the left, a group of people emerge from the side door of a church and spread out onto the street: they are mostly young girls who have made their first communion, dressed in white and holding missals and candles, symbols of the sacrament. In the background, others walk or carriage away.

The pictorial space is organized into two distinct perspectives of architecture and people, with the foreground having an atelier realism, while the background shows a sfumato effect. A large arched branch helps frame and focus the eye on the foreground.

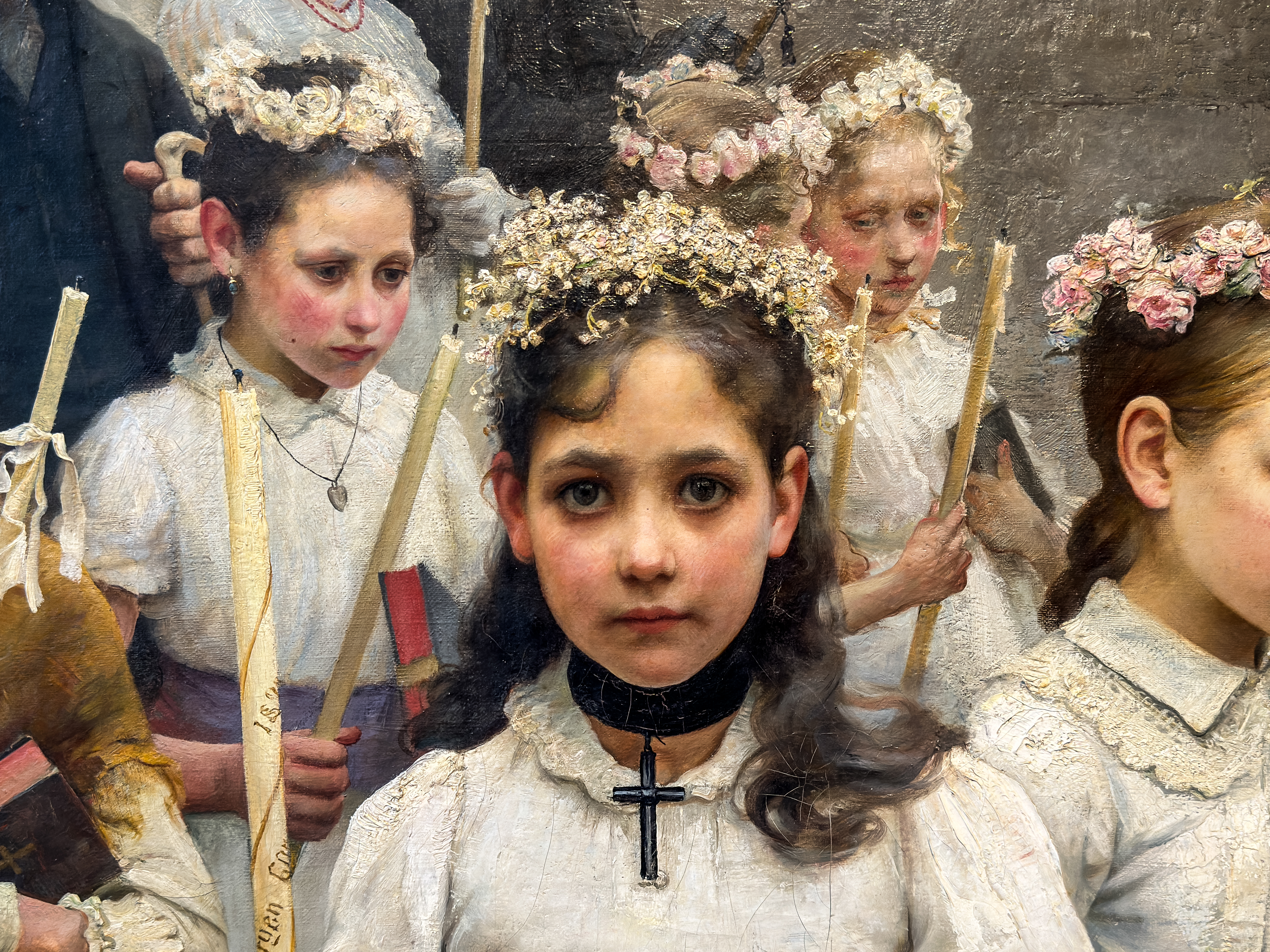

The girls are mainly involved with each other or absorbed in themselves; the candles that they keep loosely in their hands are diagonally arranged, which gives a sense of movement. In contrast, the girl standing in the foreground, intensely staring at the viewer and actively holding the candle away from her body, generates an effect of eerie stillness. Because of her intense dark eyes and the “photographic” sharpness of her contours, she almost seems to “step out of the picture”, contributing to the disconcerting effect that is the distinguishing feature of this painting.

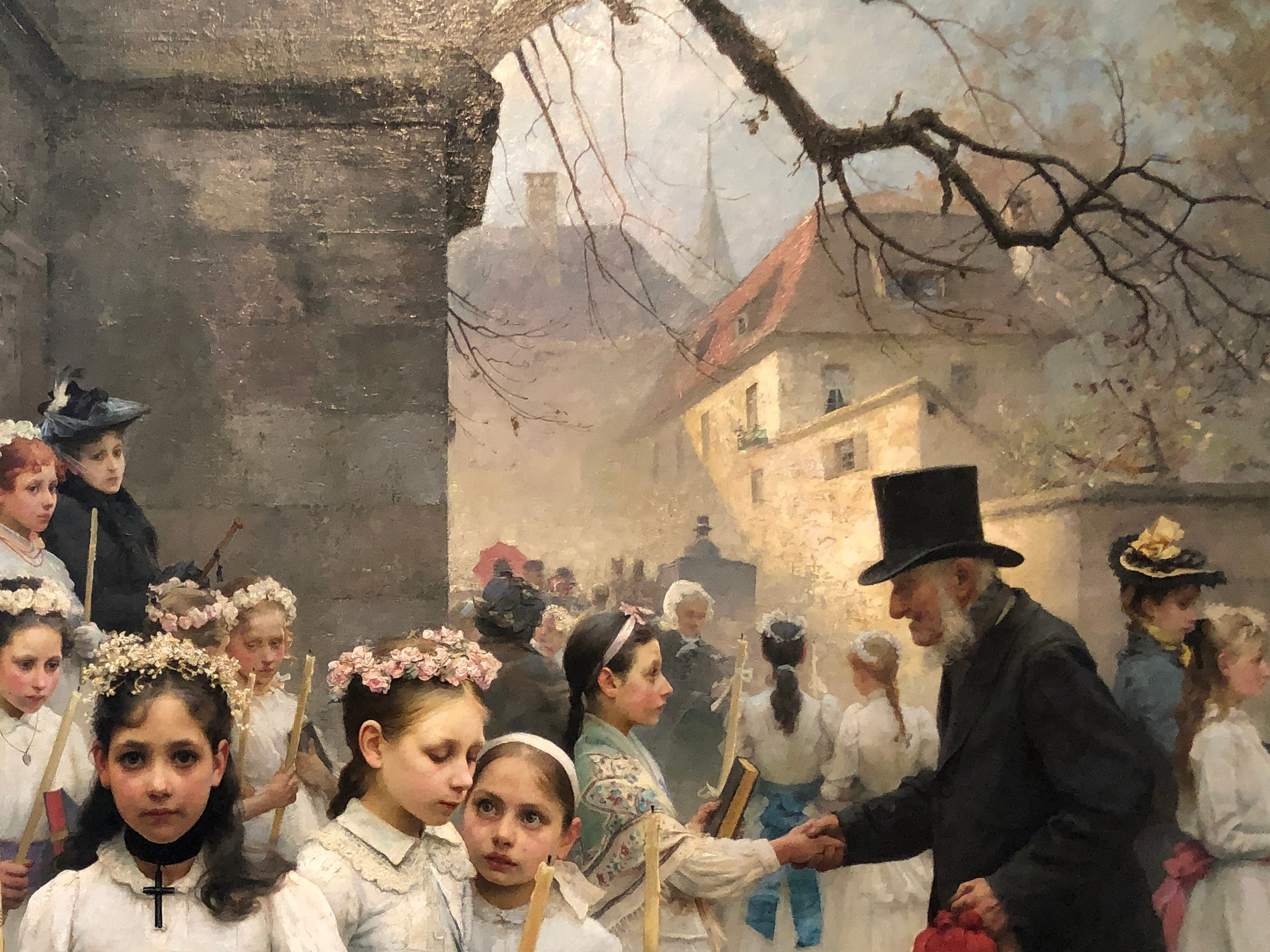

Wearing mostly dark clothes, the adults create a play of chiaroscuro, thus emphasizing the contrast between youth and old age that is always repeated in Smith's paintings and finds its meanings in positivist culture and social analysis. All characters are well researched and depicted, as they say, with marked "atelier" realism, although there is no lack of atmospheric effects, here highlighted by the warm brightness of the background on the right where the buildings and sky fade into the distance.

== See also ==
In 1880, at the age of 21, Carl Frithjof Smith, a Norwegian by birth, enrolled in the Munich Academy of Fine Arts with Ludwig von Löfftz among the principal instructors, a genre painter who certainly influenced him toward this type of painting. As early as 1890, however, Frithjof Smith moved to Weimar where he obtained a teaching position at the Grand-Ducal Saxon Art School, Weimar and where he would remain for the rest of his life.

In Weimar the climate was rather conservative and intransigent, nevertheless Frithjof Smith managed to reconcile academicism with the new en plein air fashions to such an extent that his paintings were appreciated both by opponents of "en plein air" and in Munich. This “After first Communion” in particular is enthralling and beloved also today.
