= Nicolai Johansen =

Norwegian sports official

- Born: 29 November 1917; Skien, Norway
- Died: 24 October 1999 (aged 81)
- Occupation: sports official

Nicolai "Nicken" Johansen (29 November 1917 – 24 October 1999) was a Norwegian sports official. He was born in Skien. He served as Secretary general of the Norwegian Football Association from 1955 to 1983. His international positions included membership of several committees of the Union of European Football Associations. He was decorated Knight, First Class of the Order of St. Olav in 1988. He died in Bærum in 1999.
