= Sverre Hartmann =

Norwegian historian and jurist

Sverre Hartmann (2 May 1917 – 22 September 2003) was a Norwegian historian and jurist. He was born in Borgund. His research interests primarily focused on Norway during World War II. Among his books are Spillet on Norge from 1958 and Fører uten folk from 1959.

== Selected works ==
- Spillet om Norge. 1958.
- Fører uten folk: Quisling som politisk og psykologisk problem. 1959.
- Nytt lys over kritiske faser i Norges historie under annen verdenskrig. 1965.
- Søkelys på 1940: var Sovjet farligere enn fienden?. 1971.
