= Åslaug Grinde =

Norwegian politician (1931–2019)

Åslaug Grinde (2 April 1931 – 2 July 2019) was a Norwegian nurse, rector and politician for the Liberal Party.

Hailing from Bodø, she was a nurse and later rector of the National School of Psychiatric Nursing. It was merged into Nordland Nurse College in 1987 which in turn was merged into Bodø University College in 1994.

She served as a deputy representative to the Parliament of Norway from Nordland during the term 1969–1973. In total she met during 22 days of parliamentary session. For the 1973 Norwegian parliamentary election she was second on the Liberal Party ballot, behind Johan Kleppe, but the Liberal Party lost their seat. She was also leader of Nordland Liberal Party.
