= Kristian Fougner =

Norwegian resistance fighter

Kristian Fougner, DSC (21 April 1919 – 30 August 2012) was a Norwegian engineer and resistance member.

Fougner was born in Halden to Bjørn Fougner and Ragnhild Klaveness. He graduated from the Norwegian Institute of Technology in 1946.

While a student in Trondheim during the German occupation of Norway, Fougner took part in resistance activities for the intelligence organization XU, and for the British Secret Intelligence Service (SIS). He operated the SIS wireless station Leporis from 1942 to 1943.

For his war contributions, he was decorated with the Norwegian War Cross with Sword, and the British Distinguished Service Cross.
