= Per Hafslund =

Norwegian photographer and zoologist

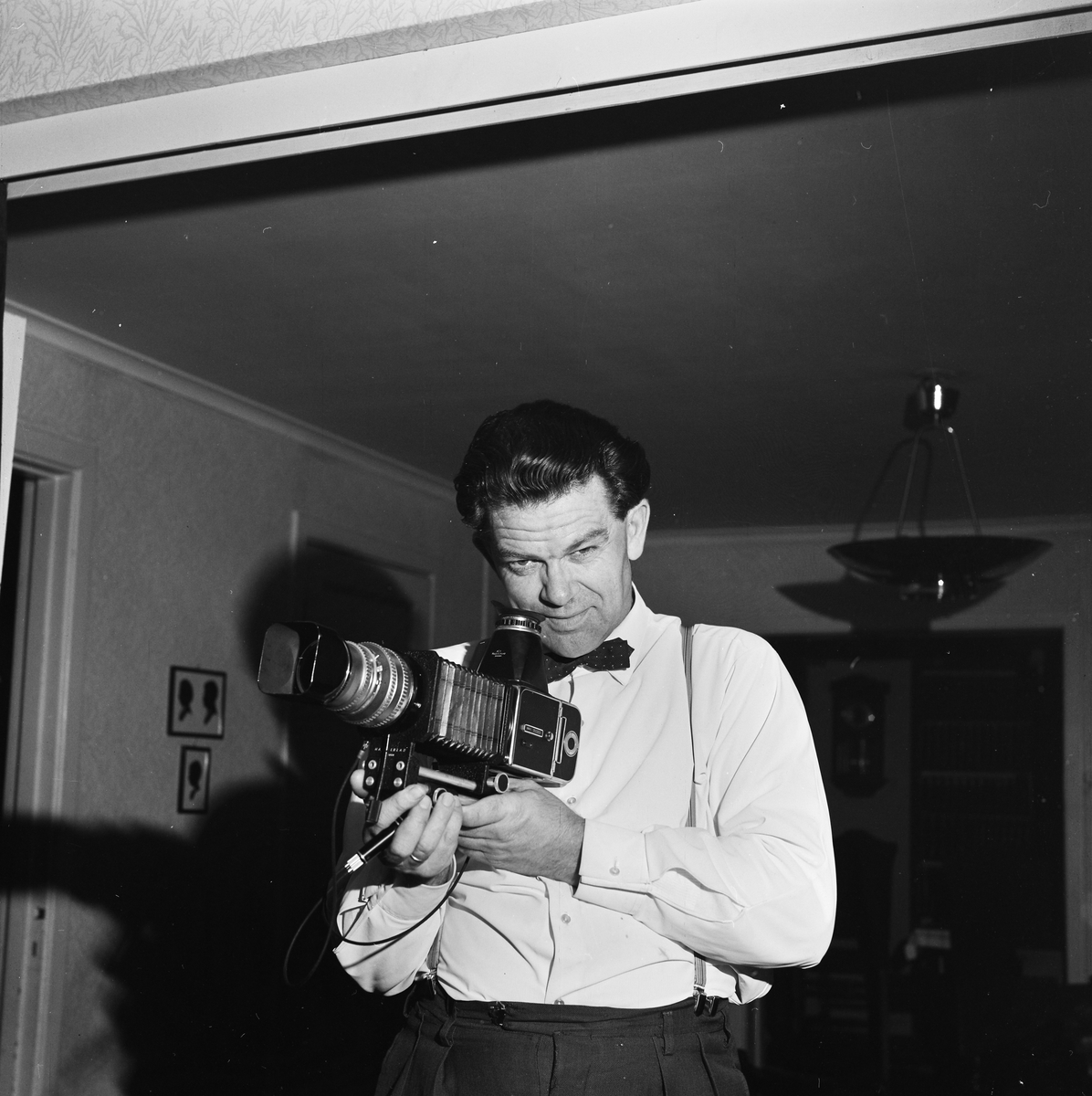
- Born: 18 August 1918; Drammen, Norway
- Died: 3 May 1990 (aged 71)
- Occupations: Zoologist; Photographer; Educator

Per Hafslund (18 August 1918 – 3 May 1990) was a Norwegian biologist, educator and broadcasting person. He was born in Drammen. He graduated in zoology from the University of Oslo in 1946. Working for the Norwegian Broadcasting Corporation, he produced more than 35 programs for Skolekringkastingen between 1952 and 1959, and thereafter 64 programs for television. Among his books are Naturens eventyr from 1962 and Dyr i kameraøyet from 1964.
