= Ole Devegge =

Norwegian librarian, numismatist and collector

Ole Devegge (20 October 1772 – 16 January 1847) was a Norwegian-Danish librarian, numismatist and collector.
