= Rita Haugerud =

Norwegian politician

Rita Haugerud (6 June 1919 – 8 May 2014) was a Norwegian politician for the Conservative Party.

She served as a deputy representative to the Parliament of Norway from Oslo during the term 1965–1969. In total she met during 1 day of parliamentary session.
