= Olav O. Nomeland =

Norwegian politician

Olav O. Nomeland (30 September 1919 - 11 December 1986) was a Norwegian politician for the Liberal Party.

He served as a deputy representative to the Norwegian Parliament from Aust-Agder during the term 1965–1969 and 1969–1973.
