= Per Olav Baarnaas =

Norwegian racewalker

Personal information
- Nationality: Norwegian
- Born: 4 November 1919 Kristiania, Norway
- Died: 20 November 2004 (aged 85)

Sport
- Sport: Race walking
- Club: Sterling

Per Olav Baarnaas (4 November 1919 – 20 November 2004) was a Norwegian race walker. He was born in Kristiania, and represented the sports club Sterling. He competed at the 1948 Summer Olympics in London.
