= 1847 Norwegian parliamentary election =

- May–30 September 1847

All 105 seats in the Storting 53 seats needed for a majority
- Registered: 71,853
- Turnout: 49.07%
Prime Minister before election
Frederik Gottschalck Haxthausen Due
Prime Minister after election
Frederik Gottschalck Haxthausen Due

Parliamentary elections were held in Norway in 1847. As political parties were not officially established until 1884, all those elected were independents. The number of seats in the Storting was increased from 102 to 105. Voter turnout was 49%, although only 5% of the country's population was eligible to vote.

== Results ==
Of the 105 seats, 45 were won by civil servants, 39 by farmers, sheriffs, church singers and teachers and 21 by people with other professions.

Party	Votes	%	Seats
Independents			105
Total			105
Total votes	35,258	–	
Registered voters/turnout	71,853	49.07	
Source: Nohlen & Stöver, NSSDS
