= Arne Konrad Eldegard =

Norwegian banker and politician (1917–2018)

Arne Konrad Eldegard (30 November 1917 – 12 March 2018) was a Norwegian banker and politician for the Liberal Party and later the Liberal People's Party.

Eldegard was born in Årdal Municipality in November 1917. He served as a deputy representative to the Norwegian Parliament from Sogn og Fjordane during the term 1965–1969. In 1972 he joined the Liberal People's Party which split from the Liberals over disagreements of Norway's proposed entry to the European Economic Community.

On the local level Eldegard was a member of the municipal council for Årdal Municipality from 1947 to 1959, and then of its executive committee from 1963 to 1970.

Outside politics Eldegard worked in the bank Indre Sogn Sparebank from 1946 to 1984, being director since 1973. He was also involved in the local sports club IL Jotun. He turned 100 in November 2017.
