= Gunnar Haarberg =

Gunnar Haarberg (28 July 1917 – 1 October 2009) was a Norwegian philologist, teacher, radio- and television personality.

Haarberg was born in Trondheim. He was a philologist, teacher, radio personality and was called Norway's first television celebrity. For a few years, he taught English at the Norwegian police academy

Haarberg was also an English teacher, and wrote several books on the subject.

== Works ==
- The perfect guide. The right way to help tourists and talk to them, 1958
- My English friends, 2. bd., Trondheim 1959
- On your own in England, 1960 (2. utg. 1967)
- Good evening, friends. English for beginners, 1964
- E det Kvijtt eller dobbelt? (Gunnar Haarberg intervjuet av Krestjan Flatlajndet), 1965
- English just for you, 1965
- Engelsk grammatikk for yrkesskolen for handel og kontorarbeid, 1974
