= Carl Frithjof Smith =

Norwegian painter

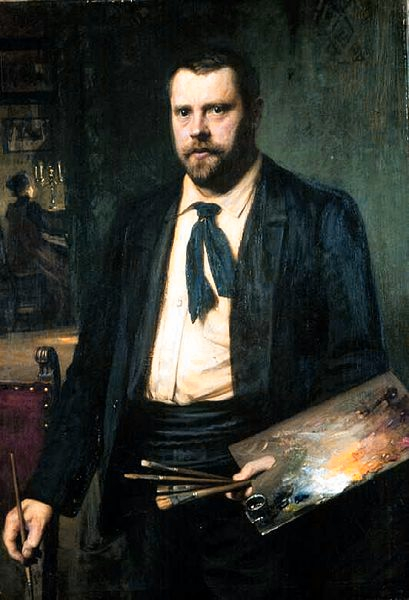
Self-portrait (1905)

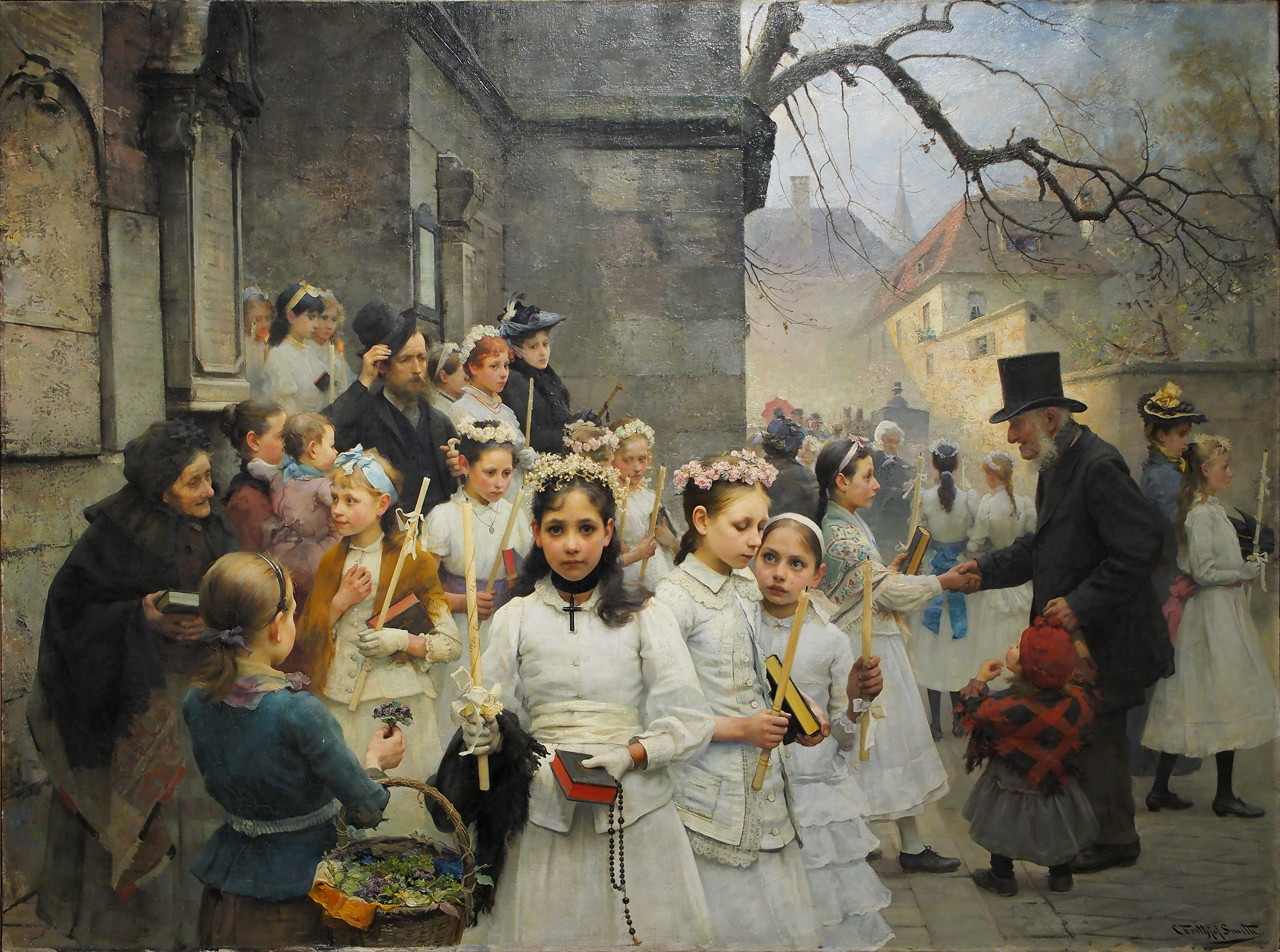
After First Communion (1892)

Carl Frithjof Smith (5 April 1859 – 11 October 1917) was a Norwegian portrait and genre painter who spent his career in Germany.

== Biography ==
Carl Frithjof Smith was born at Christiania, Norway. His father, Christian August Smith, was a furrier. At the age of eighteen, he began working as a draftsman in the mechanical workshops of Trondheim. It was there that he took up painting in his spare time.

In 1880, he applied for a state travel grant, but was rejected. Nevertheless, he left Norway and enrolled at the Academy of Fine Arts, Munich, where he studied until 1884, when he had his debut at the Autumn Exhibition at Christiania. His primary instructor there was the genre painter Ludwig von Löfftz, who influenced him to focus on genre scenes as well. In 1890, he was called to be a professor at the Grand-Ducal Saxon Art School, Weimar, and remained there in that capacity until 1904. After his resignation, he continued to live in Weimar, as he had become a full member of the Deutscher Künstlerbund. He died at Weimar in 1917.

Perhaps his best known student was Max Beckmann. He won gold medals at exhibitions in Berlin in 1886 and 1891 (at the Internationalen Kunst-Ausstellung). He was also awarded a medal at the Glaspalast (Munich) and won the silver Staatsmedaille in Vienna at the Jubiläumsausstellung (1888). In addition, he held several showings at the Grosse Berliner Kunstausstellung in Berlin. His works were familiar throughout Germany and Sweden, but not in Norway, as he seldom exhibited there, despite making several extended trips home. On one of these trips, he did a portrait of the internationally known playwright, Henrik Ibsen.

== Gallery ==
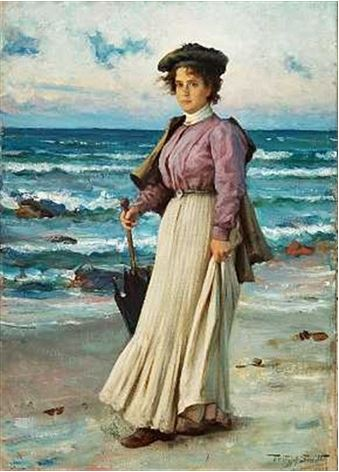
Young Woman Strolling on the Beach
(1900)

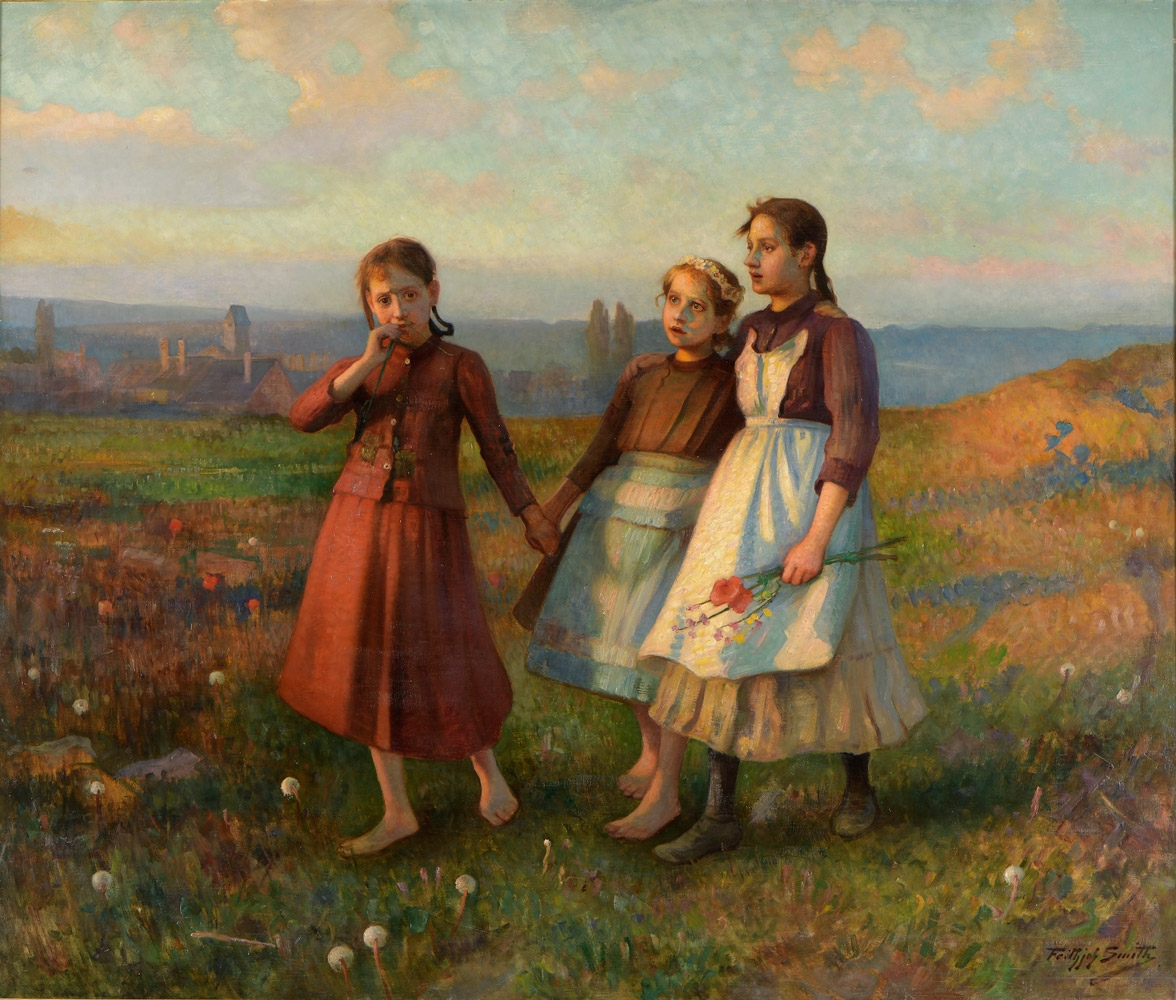
Girls in the Meadow
(circa 1900)

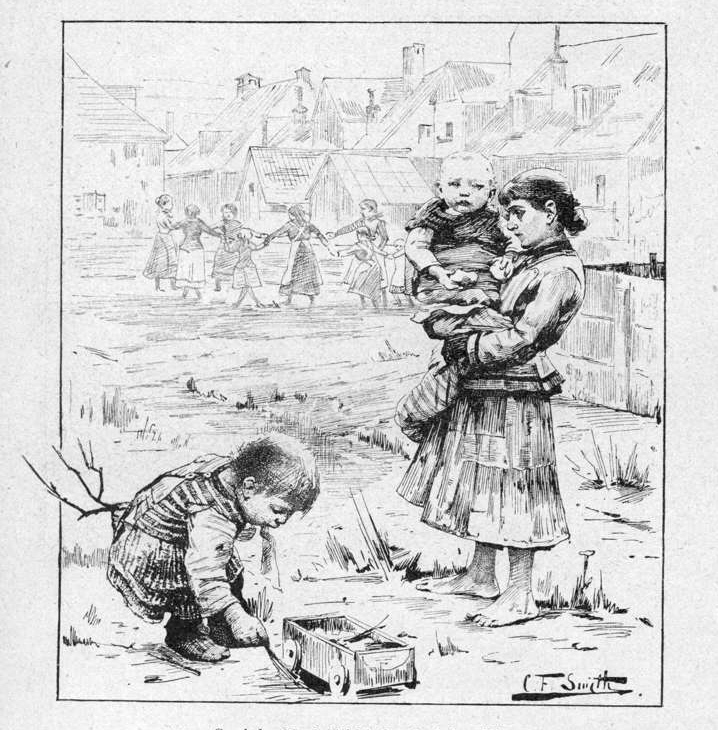
On the Meadow
(1889)
