= Bjarne Hanssen =

Norwegian politician (1917–2014)

Bjarne Hanssen (3 September 1917 – 29 December 2014) was a Norwegian politician for the Socialist Left Party.

He served as a deputy representative to the Parliament of Norway from Troms during the term 1973–1977. In total he met during 19 days of parliamentary session.
