= Solveig Christov =

Norwegian writer (1918–1984)

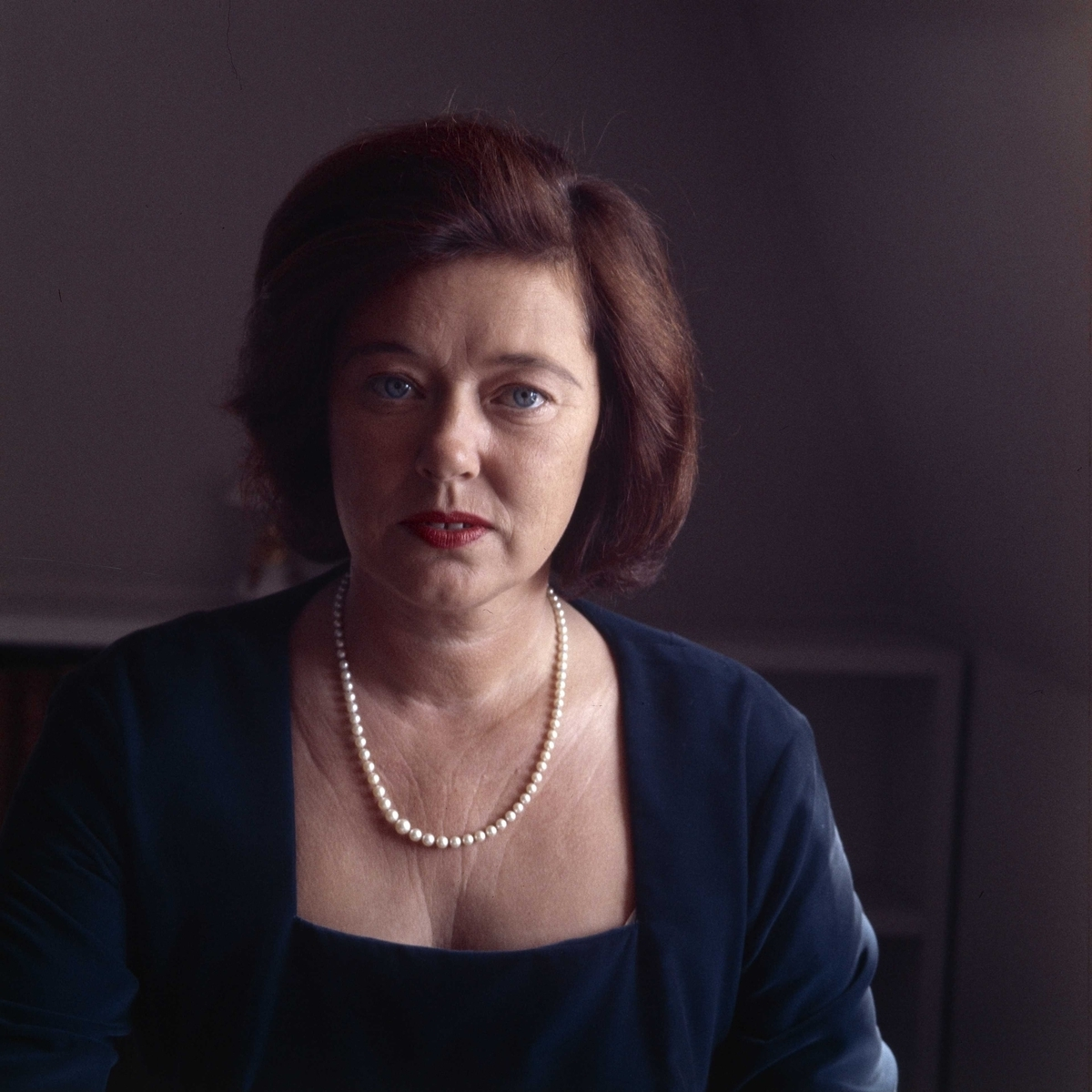
- Christov in 1962
- Born: Solveig Fredriksen; 29 October 1918; Drammen, Norway
- Died: 16 May 1984 (aged 65)
- Occupations: Novelist; Playwright
- Awards: Riksmål Society Literature Prize

Solveig Beda Christov (née Fredriksen; 29 October 1918 – 16 May 1984) was a Norwegian novelist, writer of short stories, and playwright.

== Early and personal life ==
Solveig Fredriksen was born in Drammen as a daughter of electrician Fredrik Adolf Fredriksen and Solveig Henriette Henriksen. She was married three times, to Rolf Normann Bekke from 1941 to 1946, to businessman Paal Thinn Christophersen from 1947 to 1959, and to publisher Harald Grieg from 1960. She took the last name Christov as a pen name in 1949.

== Literary career ==
Christov made her literary debut in 1949 with the novel Det blomstrer langs blindveien. She followed up with the novels På veiene til og fra (1951) and Torso (1952), which is regarded as her literary breakthrough. In the 1950s, she also wrote the love novel Syv dager og netter (1955), Demningen (1957), and the psychological novel Korsvei i jungelen (1959). Her novel Elskerens hjemkomst (1961) treats erotical themes, while the novel Skyldneren (1965) has guilt as a central motif. She published the collection of short stories Jegeren og viltet (1962) and later I dag er vårt liv (1974). Her novels Tilfellet Martin (1970) and Knivsliperens dagbok (1976) are both about insanity.

Christov's plays Det hemmelige regnskap (1957) and På rødt pass (1958) were both performed at the National Theatre. The monologue Veversken was played at television theatre Fjernsynsteatret in 1968. Among her audio plays are To guitarer and Terminal, played by the Norwegian Broadcasting Corporation. The play Sub Rosa was played at the Bergen International Festival in 1971.

She was awarded the Riksmål Society Literature Prize in 1962.
