= Alf Nordhus =

Norwegian barrister (1919–1997)

- Born: 25 August 1919; Bergen, Norway
- Died: 19 December 1997 (aged 78); Oslo
- Burial place: Vestre Aker
- Occupation: barrister

Alf Nordhus (25 August 1919 – 19 December 1997) was a Norwegian barrister.

== Personal life ==
Alf Magnus Nordhus was born in Bergen, Norway, on 25 August 1919. His parents were Magnus Carl Nordhus and Johanne Christine Steffensen. He was married twice, first to Lene Laura Ingeborg Schartum-Hansen, and second time to psychiatrist Inger Thoen.

== Career ==
Nordhus graduated from the University of Oslo with a law degree in 1943. He was a public prosecutor from 1946 to 1947. Nordhus was licensed as an attorney in 1953 and opened his own law practice in Oslo the same year. From 1958 he practiced as a barrister before the Supreme Court of Norway.

He became a very well known and sought-after defense lawyer. He served in the defense in several serious criminal cases. Among his most prominent trials were the Hollekim case (1964) where he went against his own client who had confessed to murder and got him acquitted. The Liv case (1982) involved a woman accused of having killed her husband after years of being subjected to psychological and physical abuse. A bust of Nordhus, sculptured by Nils Aas, is located at the Oslo Courthouse.
