= Lulla Einrid Fossland =

Norwegian politician

Lulla Einrid Fossland (13 August 1917 – 3 December 2009) is a Norwegian politician for the Labour Party.

She was born in Harstad.

She served as a deputy representative to the Norwegian Parliament from Rogaland during the terms 1969–1973 and 1973–1977. From November 1969 to 1973 she served as a regular representative, filling in for Peder P. Næsheim who had died.

On the local level she was a member of the municipal council of Karmøy Municipality from 1967 to 1971.
