= Indre Sogn Sparebank =

Norwegian savings bank

- Company type: Savings bank
- Traded as: OSE: ISSG
- Industry: Financial services
- Founded: 1971
- Headquarters: Årdalstangen, Norway
- Area served: Western Norway
- Total assets: 7,800,000,000 Norwegian krone (2019)
- Number of employees: 52 (2019)
- Website: www.indresognsparebank.no

Indre Sogn Sparebank is a Norwegian savings bank, headquartered in Årdalstangen, Norway. The bank's main market is the area surrounding Sognefjorden.

The bank was established in 1971 with the merger of Årdal Sparebank, Lærdal Sparebank and Borgund Sparebank. The bank is a member of Eika Gruppen.
