= Oluf Iversen =

Norwegian politician

Oluf Iversen (18 November 1847 – 26 January 1917) was a Norwegian politician for the Liberal Party.

He was born in Moss as the son of a glazier. He took over his father's glazier workshop in 1861.

He became involved in politics, and served for an unknown period on the city council in Moss. He was elected to the Norwegian Parliament in 1895, representing the constituency of Moss og Drøbak. He was re-elected in 1898, 1900 and 1904.
