= Åslaug Linge Sunde =

Norwegian politician

Deputy Representative from Møre og Romsdal
- In office 1977–1981

Personal details
- Born: 26 September 1917
- Died: 3 August 2006 (aged 88)
- Party: Liberal Party

Åslaug Linge Sunde (26 September 1917 – 3 August 2006) was a Norwegian politician for the Liberal Party.

She served as a deputy representative to the Norwegian Parliament from Møre og Romsdal during the term 1977–1981. In total she met during 6 days of parliamentary session. She grew up in Valldal, but settled in Spjelkavik.
