= Carl Wilhelm Bøckmann Barth =

Norwegian military officer and painter (1847–1919)

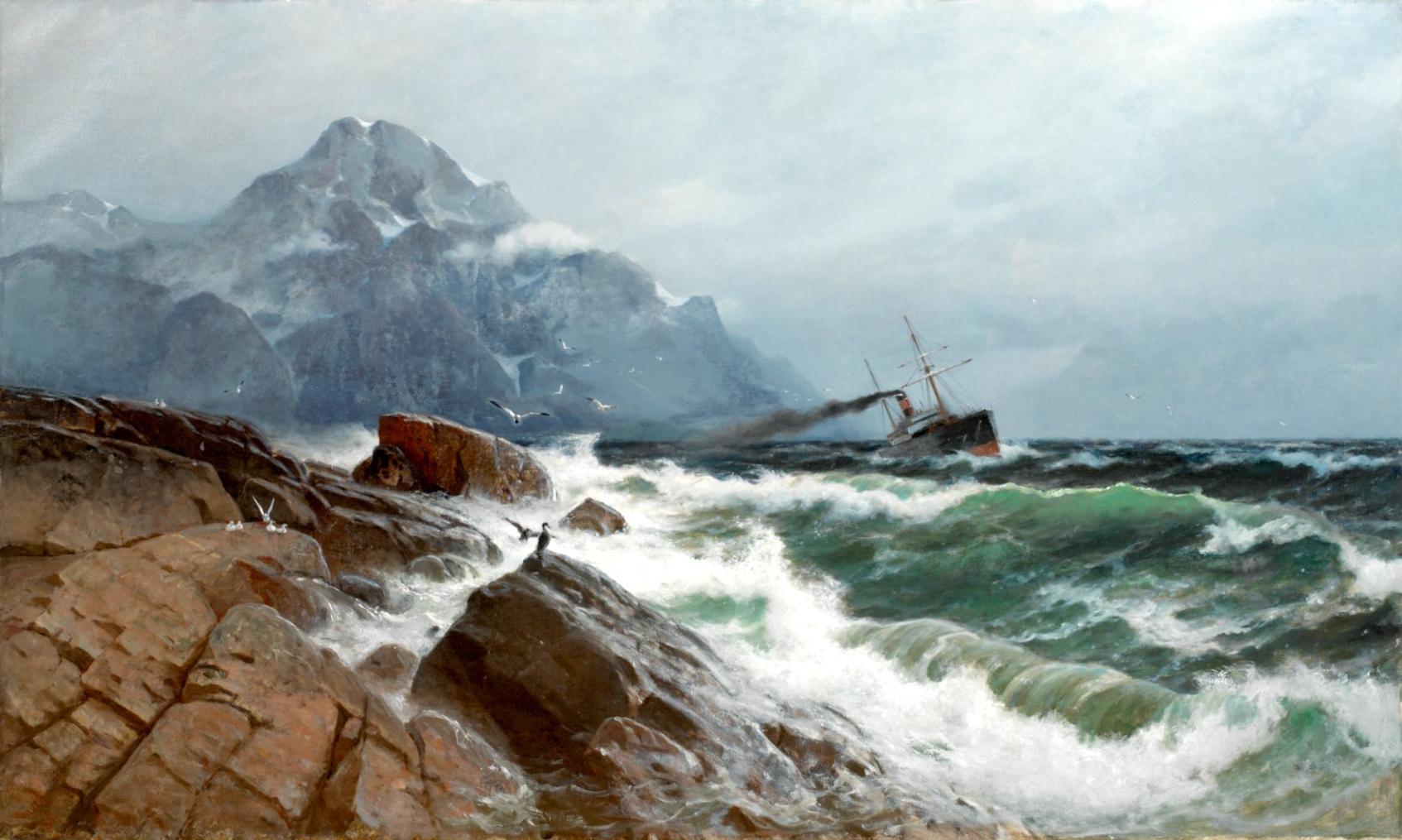
Marine (1885)

Carl Wilhelm Bøckmann Barth (9 November 1847 – 12 January 1919) was a Norwegian military officer and painter who specialized in marine art.

Carl Wilhelm Bøckmann Barth was born in Christiania (now Oslo), Norway. He was the son of circuit judge Daniel Nikolaj Barth (1810–1880) and his wife Marie Cathrine Koefoed (1815–1853). Barth served in the Royal Norwegian Navy from 1863 until 1884; retiring as a first lieutenant.

Barth studied painting under Hans Gude at the Karlsruhe in Berlin from 1881 to 1883. He spent part of 1889 and 1890 in London, partly on study trips along the English coast, especially at Dover. He later traveled to Paris and Brittany in 1896 and 1897. He was in Italy and Tunisia from 1902 to 1903. In addition, he made numerous study trips along the Norwegian coast as well as to Skagen.

Barth served as the director of the Christiania Art Society from 1889 to 1895 and again from 1898 to 1902. He served as the society's chairman from 1898 to 1901. He was a member of the National Gallery in Oslo and chairman of the Artist Association from 1891 to 1898. He is represented by three works in the National Gallery of Norway; Losbåt i høy sjø (1882), Strand ved Dover (1889), and Marine (1885).

== Awards ==
- Honorable Mention at Paris Exposition – 1889
- Order of St. Olav – 1895

== Gallery ==
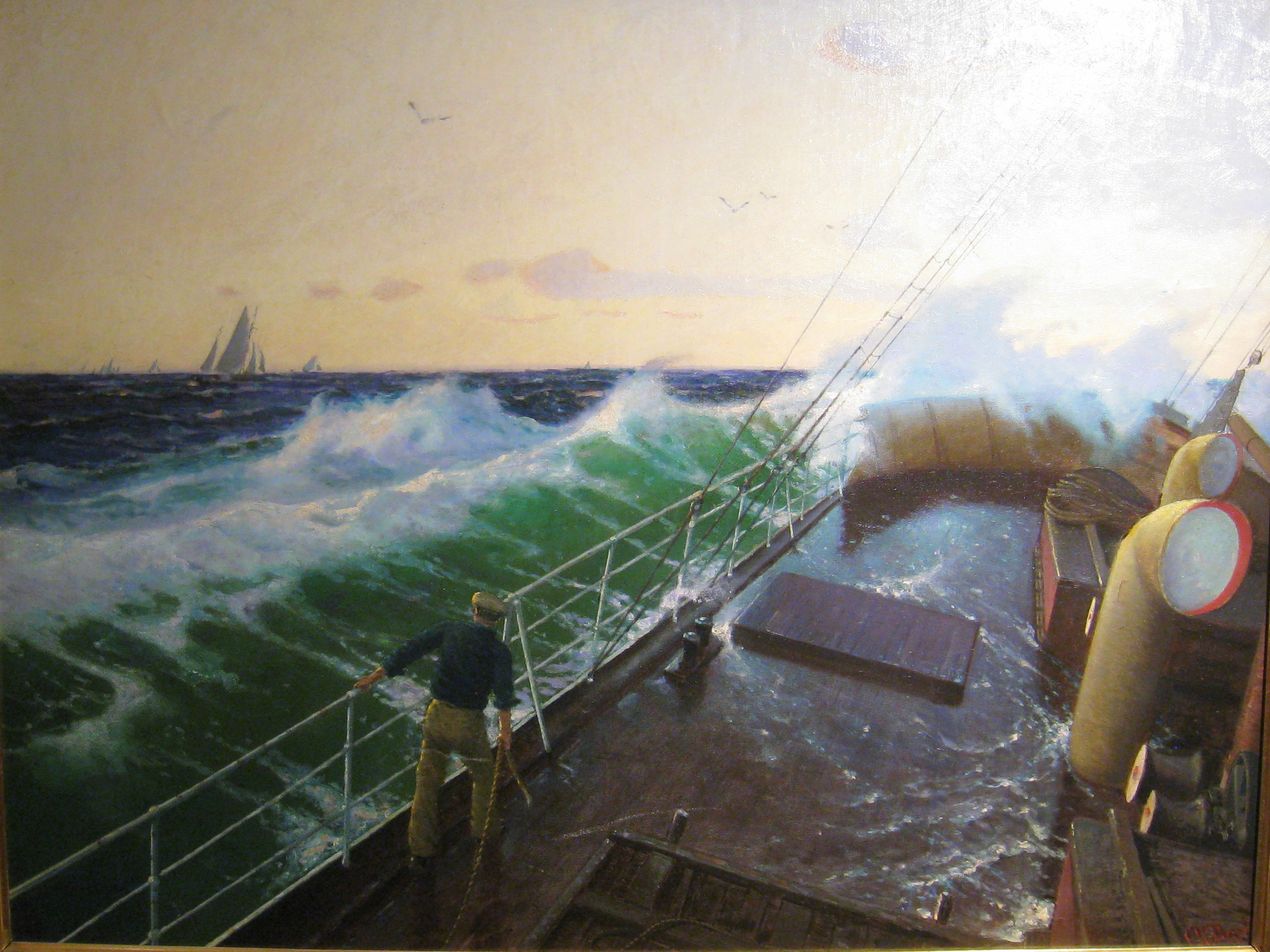
I Skip I Rom Sjø (undated)

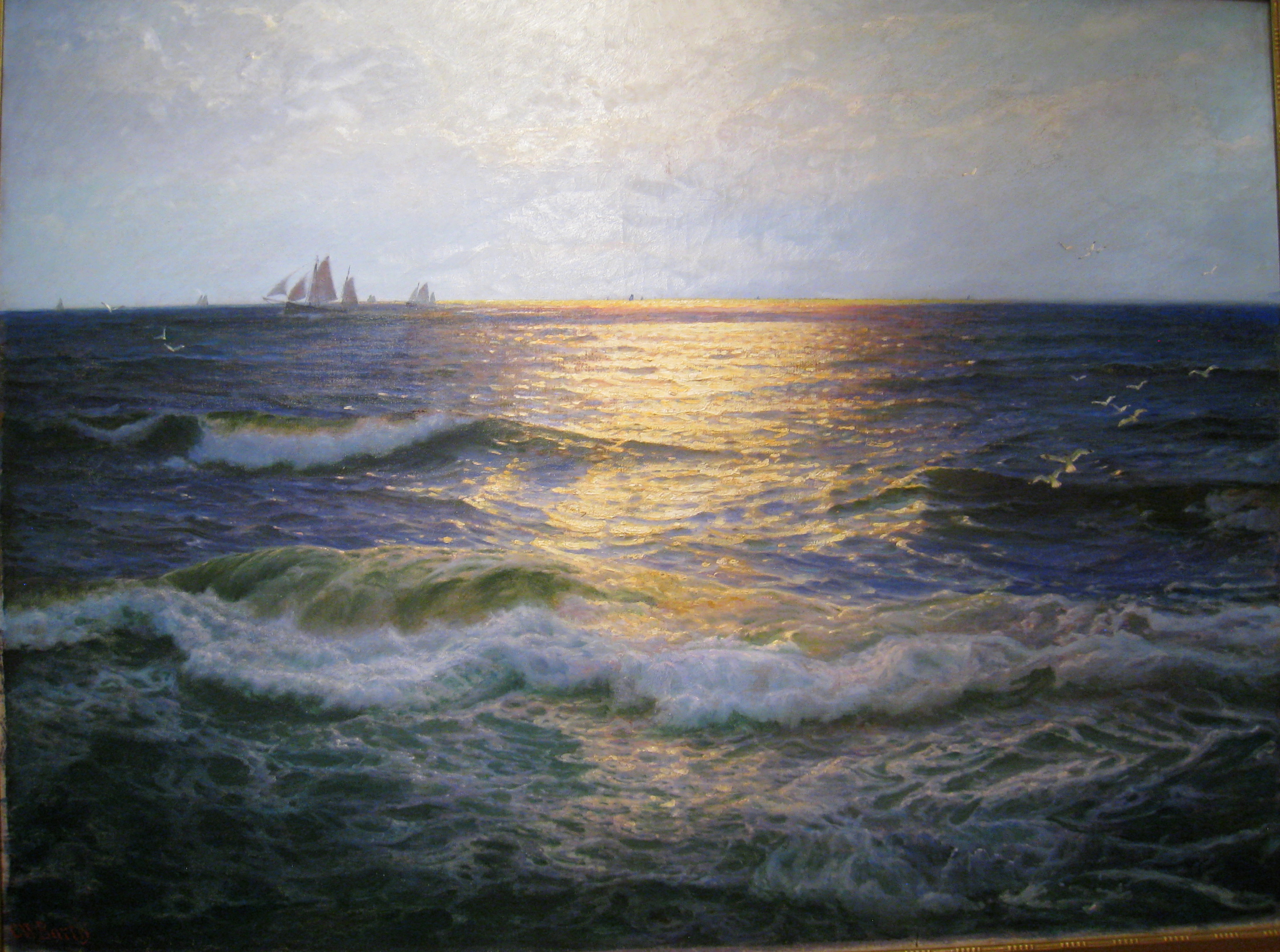
I Havbrynet – Solgangsveir (undated)

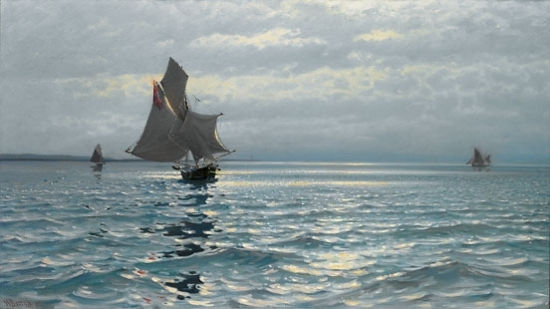
Seilskuter og glitrende sjø (1893)

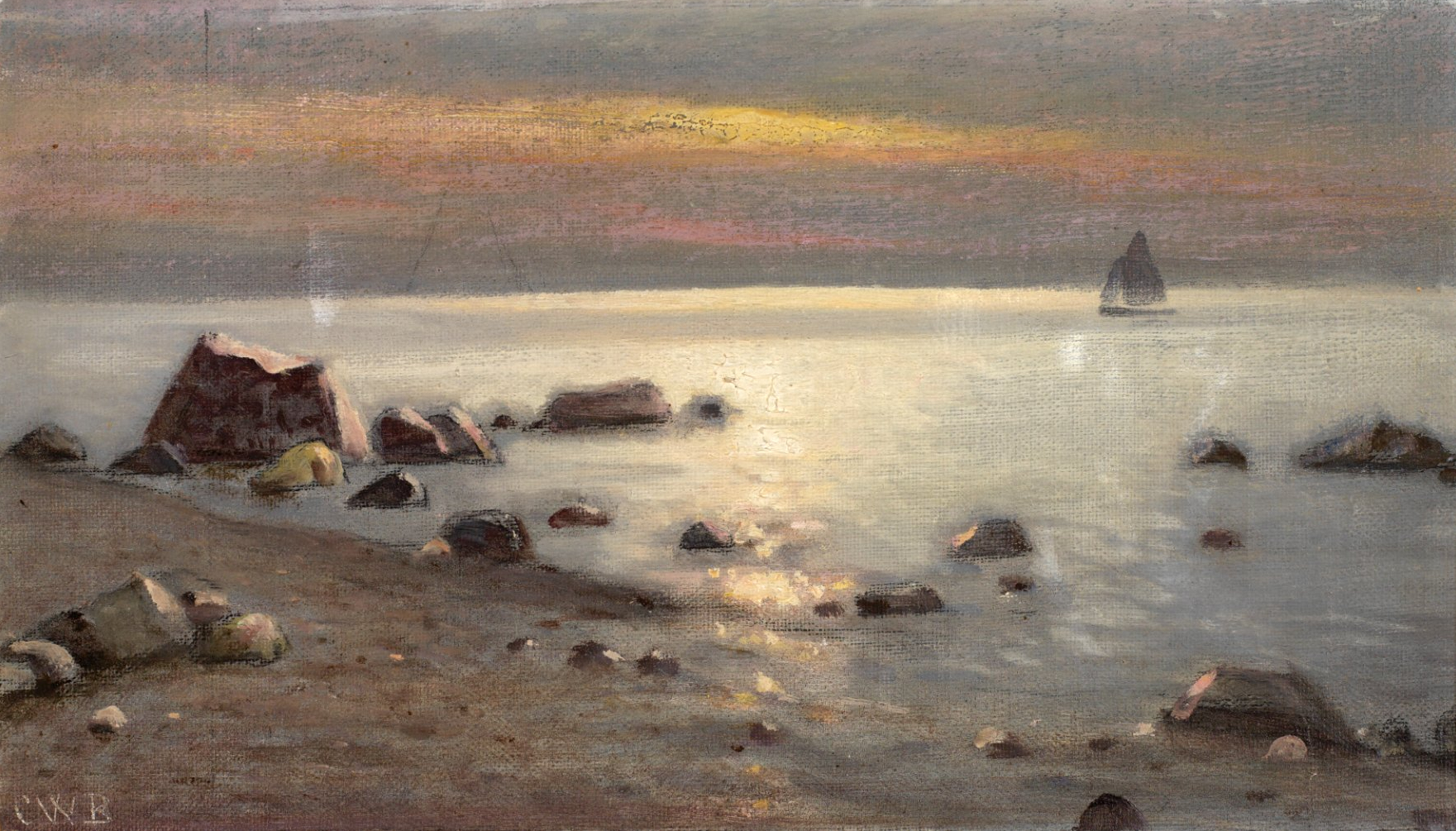
Strand ved Ogne, Jæderen (before 1919)
