= Knut Andreas Pettersen Agersborg =

Norwegian politician

Knut Andreas Pettersen Agersborg (1765–1847) was a Norwegian politician.

Agersborg was born at Vefsn in Nordland county, Norway. He worked as a farmer, fisherman, and ship-owner. He also served as police sergeant in his village. He served as a deputy representative to the Norwegian Parliament during the term 1824–1826, representing the constituency of Nordlands Amt (now Nordland).
