= Scandinavian Heritage Park =

Park in Minot, North Dakota

Coordinates: 48°13′34″N 101°17′51″W

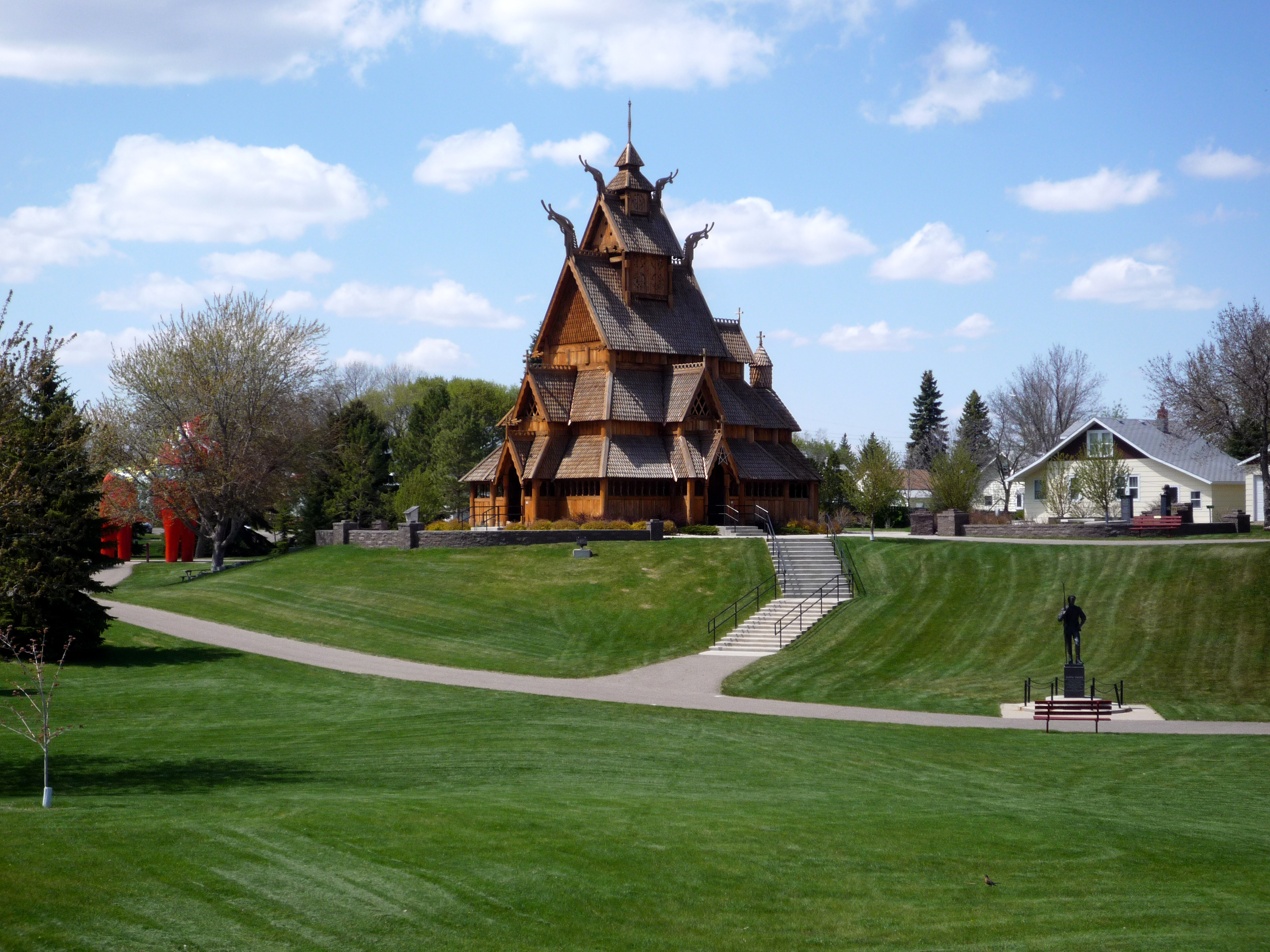
Scandinavian Heritage Park

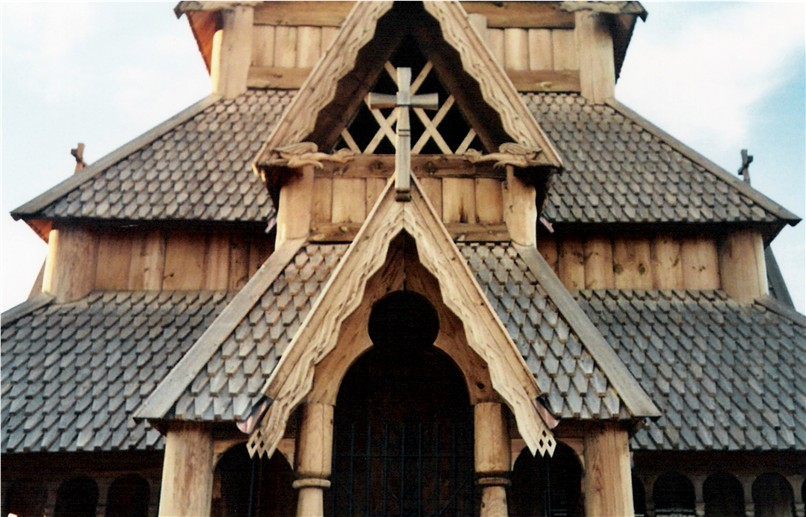
Stave Church detail

Scandinavian Heritage Park is a park located in the Upper Brooklyn neighborhood of Minot, North Dakota. Scandinavian Heritage Park features remembrances and replicas from each of the Scandinavian countries: Denmark, Norway, Sweden, Finland and Iceland. The park was established during 1988 to celebrate and preserve Scandinavian heritage. The first building was dedicated October 9, 1990.

It is believed to be the only park in the world representing all five Nordic countries. The park is supported by the Scandinavian Heritage Association and Norsk Høstfest, both of which have offices at the park.

== Park Highlights ==
- Casper Oimoen statue - Norwegian born captain of the ski team for the United States at the 1936 Winter Olympics
- Dala Horse - 30 feet tall replica of brightly colored horses from the province of Dalarna, Sweden
- Danish Windmill - working windmill on rock and concrete base built locally in 1928
- Finnish Sauna - authentic free standing sauna built in traditional Finnish style
- Flag Display - flags of the five Nordic countries, Canada and the United States
- Gol stave church - replica of the original Gol Stave Church that was built in Gol, Hallingdal, Norway
- Hans Christian Andersen statue - Danish writer famous for his fairy tales
- Leif Eirikssen statue - bronze statue of the Icelandic explorer
- Nordic Pavilion - Arts and Picnic Shelter
- Observatory - 48-inch diameter spinning marble globe fountain
- Plaza Scandinavia - granite map of the five Nordic countries
- Scandinavian Heritage Center - office of the Scandinavian Heritage Association
- Sigdal House - 200-year-old house relocated from the Vatnas area of Sigdal, Norway
- Sondre Norheim statue - Norwegian born father of modern skiing
- Sondre Norheim eternal flame - monument represents the sport of skiing
- Stabbur - replica of a storehouse from a farm near Telemark, Norway
- Waterfall - cascading waterfall and rippling stream that flows down to serene ponds
