= Johan Willoch Erichsen =

19th and 20th-century Norwegian Lutheran bishop and theologian

The Right Reverend Johan Willoch Erichsen
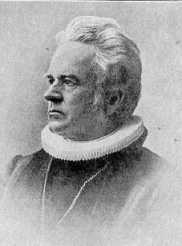
- Bishop Johan Willoch Erichsen (photo: Ludwik Szacinski)

Personal details
- Born: 15 February 1842 Kristiansand, Norway
- Died: 22 August 1916 (aged 74) Gol, Norway
- Denomination: Church of Norway
- Occupation: Priest
- Education: Cand.theol.: University of Oslo

Johan Willoch Erichsen (15 February 1842 – 22 August 1916) was a Norwegian bishop and theologian in the Church of Norway. He was Bishop of the Diocese of Bjørgvin from 1899 until shortly before his death in 1916.

== Life and family ==
Erichsen was born on 15 February 1842 in the city of Kristiansand in Lister og Mandal county in southern Norway. His father was Hans Erichsen, a church worker at the Kristiansand Cathedral, and his mother was Mathilde Sophie Willoch. He went to school and graduated in Kristiansand at the Cathedral School. He received his cand.theol. degree from the Royal Frederick University in 1864. He married Kristiane Sofie Rogstad Boeck in 1869. She died young in 1873, and in 1877 he married Kristiane's younger sister, Helga Marie Margrete Boeck. In his first marriage he had two daughters, in his second marriage, he had five daughters and a son.

== Career ==
After graduation, Erichsen chose to teach. He taught in Oslo for several years at the Nissens skole and at an all girls school run by his aunt, Kathinka Willoch, in Kristiansand. In 1868, he was hired as a chaplain for the Eidsvoll Church (Eidsvoll kirke). In 1873, he took a new job as a chaplain in Bragernes Church. He lasted there for two years before taking a job as an assistant pastor in the Skien Church parish. He worked in Skien for 15 years, from 1875 until 1890, when he was called to be the priest for the Gjerpen Church (Gjerpen kirke). He worked in Gjerpen until 1899 when he was appointed to the post of Bishop of the Diocese of Bjørgvin, based in Bergen. He served as bishop until 1 May 1916 when he retired due to failing health. He died a few months later on 22 August 1916.

Church of Norway titles
Preceded by Fredrik Waldemar Hvoslef	Bishop of Bjørgvin; 1899–1916	Succeeded by Peter Hognestad
