= Gol Stave Church =

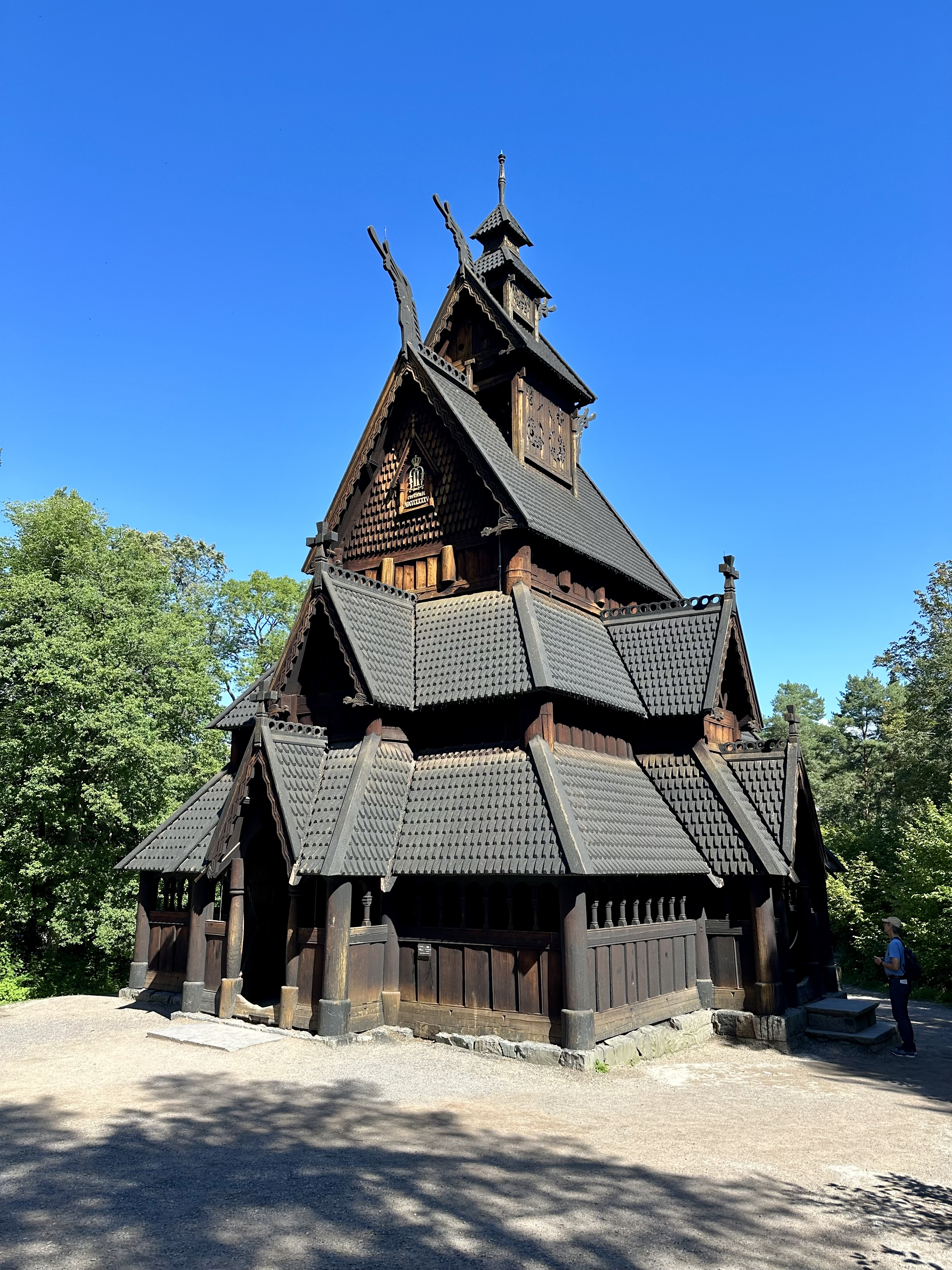

- Location of the church
- 59°54′29″N 10°41′00″E
- Location: Oslo
- Country: Norway
- Denomination: Church of Norway

History
- Status: museum

Architecture
- Architectural type: Stave church
- Completed: 1157–1216

Specifications
- Materials: Wood
- Norwegian Cultural Heritage Site
- Type: Church
- Status: Automatically listed
- ID: 84275

Gol Stave Church (Norwegian: Gol stavkirke) is a 12th century stave church originally from Gol in the traditional region of Hallingdal in Buskerud county, Norway. The reconstructed church is now a museum and is now located in the Norwegian Museum of Cultural History at Bygdøy in Oslo, Norway.

== Description ==
Gol stavkyrkje by Nicolay Nicolaysen (corrected illustration)

The church has been dendrochronologically dated to from 1157 to 1216. When the city built a new church around 1880, it was decided to demolish the old stave church. It was saved from destruction by the Society for the Preservation of Ancient Norwegian Monuments (Fortidsminneforeningen), which bought the materials in order to re-erect the church elsewhere. The remains of the original medieval construction were documented before transport. Original murals and medieval artifacts survived. Most of the main construction remained intact and in original form, although practically all of the exterior dates from the 1884–1885 restoration.

It was acquired by King Oscar II, who financed its relocation and restoration as the central building of his private open-air museum near Oslo. Architect Waldemar Hansteen assessed the condition of the conserved parts and made a plan for restoration. The restoration was overseen by Waldemar Hansteen and was completed in 1885. In 1907, the early open-air museum, the world's first, was merged with the Norwegian Museum of Cultural History, which now manages the stave church. The church, however, is still nominally the property of the reigning monarch.

In the 1980s, a modern replica has been erected in Gol as a tourist attraction in a theme park in central Gol. This replica is located some distance from the original site of the medieval church. There is also a replica in the Scandinavian Heritage Park in Minot, North Dakota and at Epcot Center in Walt Disney World in Florida.

== History ==
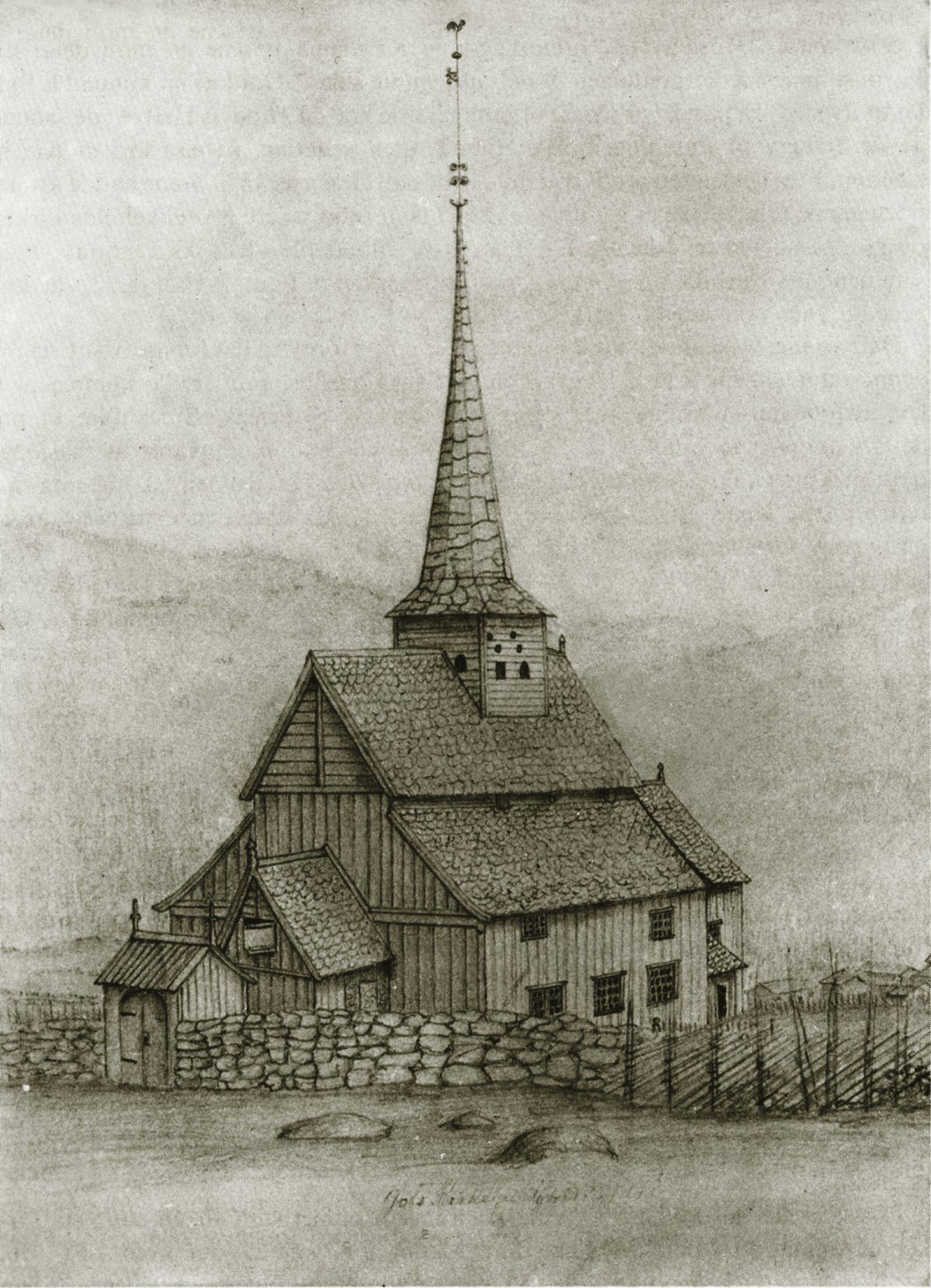
Drawing by J.N. Pram of Gol stave church from 1846, before it was moved to Bygdø in Oslo.

The church has many similarities in the construction of the inner erection with Hegge Stave Church in Valdres, and it has been assumed that the same builder was responsible for both. It probably stood in its original form until the 17th century, with a passageway around church and choirs. The choir's walls and apse have remains of murals which is reasonable to assume originate from 1652 (the year is painted on the wall) from the same painter who made decorations in Torpo Stave Church in 1648 (epitaph), Flesberg Stave Church (later overpainted), Rollag Stave Church 1653, Veggli Stave Church and Nore Stave Church 1655 and Uvdal Stave Church 1656. The apse's depiction of the Last Supper originates from the same painter, but the reconstruction of the apse's walls is uncertain. The roof rider was renewed in 1694. At the same time, a ceiling was installed, and during the same period, two windows were installed on the south wall in the central room. Around 1730, a gallery was built on the north side. Some time later, the choir and apse were demolished, and a new half-timbered choir was erected. But the old materials were reused for the ceiling in the new choir, and thus the murals survived and could be restored in connection with the move.

In 1802–1803 the church was enlarged so that it "formerly too small a church for such a numerous commons (had become) strangely larger, so that it once holds as many listeners as before". The corridors around the church were demolished, and new outer walls of table-covered trusses were erected approximately where the corridor walls had stood. A porch with a salt roof was erected in front of the west portal. The church then got the look it had when J. N. Prahm designed it in 1846.

== Relocation and rebuilding ==
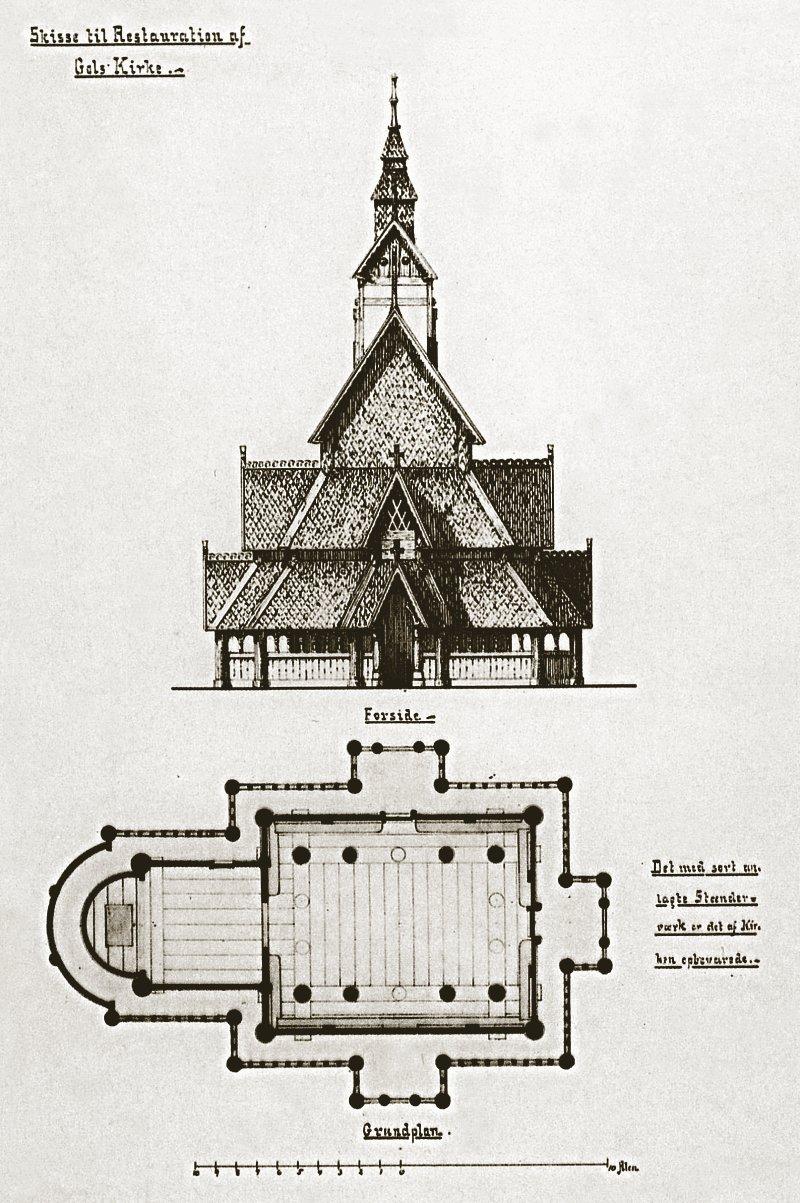
Drawing during reconstruction of Gol stave church by T. Prytz, from 1883

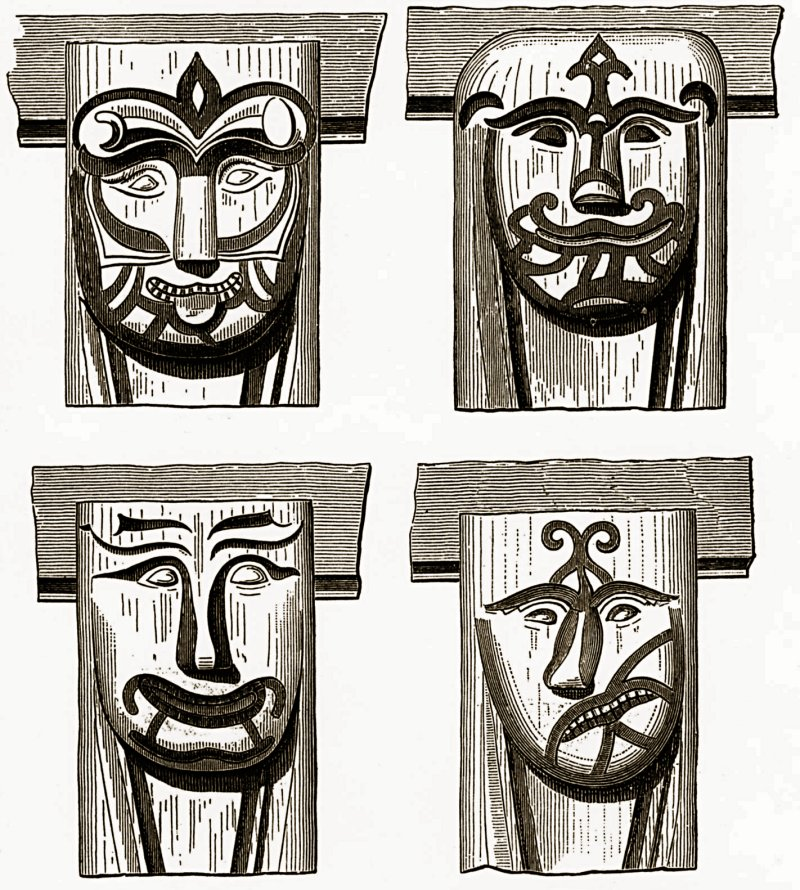
Drawings from Gol Stave Church by Nicolay Nicolaysen.

Towards the end of the 1870s, the congregation in Gol wanted a larger and more contemporary church. Society for the Preservation of Ancient Norwegian Monuments urged to preserve the stave church on the site, but the congregation wanted to demolish it and sell the materials. In the end, the society bought the church's original parts for 200 kroner, on condition that it was removed when the new one was finished.

The society had no plot for the church, but early in 1881, King Oscar II's Collections - the world's first open-air museum - were established on Bygdøy royal estate. The king made land available for the reconstruction in the middle of his planned building museum. The society's fundraising for the purpose raised only NOK 387, while the total costs were estimated at at least NOK 6,500. In March 1884, the king saved the project by undertaking to bear the expenses for which the society lacked coverage. The ownership of the church was transferred from the society to the monarch in Norway.

Due to several snow-poor winters, the dismantling and transport to Kristiania was postponed until the winter of 1884. Survey drawings were meanwhile prepared by architect Torolf Prytz in the winter of 1882–1883. Since he was busy with other assignments, the responsibility for the reconstruction on Bygdøy was taken over by architect Waldemar Hansteen with the royal estate's builder Torsten Torstensen as executor. The church was dismantled in January 1884. In March, the sledge was good enough to transport the materials to Krøderen station. From there they arrived unharmed at Bygdøy station. The original parts were completed in late July 1884, and the church was completed as the centerpiece of King Oscar's Open Air Museum in the summer of 1885. As a museum church, it was so well attended that it had to be kept open every day, not just on Sundays.

The significant changes during the 1700s and the expansion in 1805 made it impossible to rebuild the church as it stood, but neither was anyone in those days imaginable. The church was restored to what was believed to be its original form. With the support of preserved tracks and old materials, building, choirs and apse were reconstructed. The meticulous descriptions in the Church Books' accounts from the 17th century onwards also gave a clear description of exterior details that gave good enough indications for reconstruction: the roof rider mentioned in the 17th century accounts sat in the middle of the ridge and wore two bells. The bell room had a spontaneous saddle roof and carried an undefined structure that ended in a spire with a cross. The roof rider may thus have been of the same type as the one the church received when it was reconstructed on Bygdøy.

The aisles, that surrounded the whole church originally, seems to have been demolished as the various parts of the church were rebuilt. It was assumed that the church had been surrounded by a passageway and that it had had a roof rider, and these parts were recreated with Borgund Stave Church as a model. Good role models for details such as the wind skis were not found in Borgund, so they were made after the pattern of the wind skis in Hopperstad Stave Church,

King Oscar's collections were transferred to the Norwegian Folk Museum in 1907. However, the Stave Church remained in royal ownership, but was managed by the museum.

== Interior ==
When the church was moved and rebuilt, the architect only wanted to preserve and restore the parts from the Middle Ages. On the outside, it is therefore mainly a reconstruction from the 1880s of new materials. But large parts of the main structure have been preserved. These are: the foundations, the sleepers, the poles, a large part of the wall tiles and the poles. Most of the raised central space and bracing system are also preserved. The church is of the type with a raised central space with a handle in a rectangular nave. It has a slightly narrower choir that ends with an apside. The constructive parts of the choir and apse disappeared during the expansion in 1802-03 and had to be made new during the reconstruction.

== Exterior ==
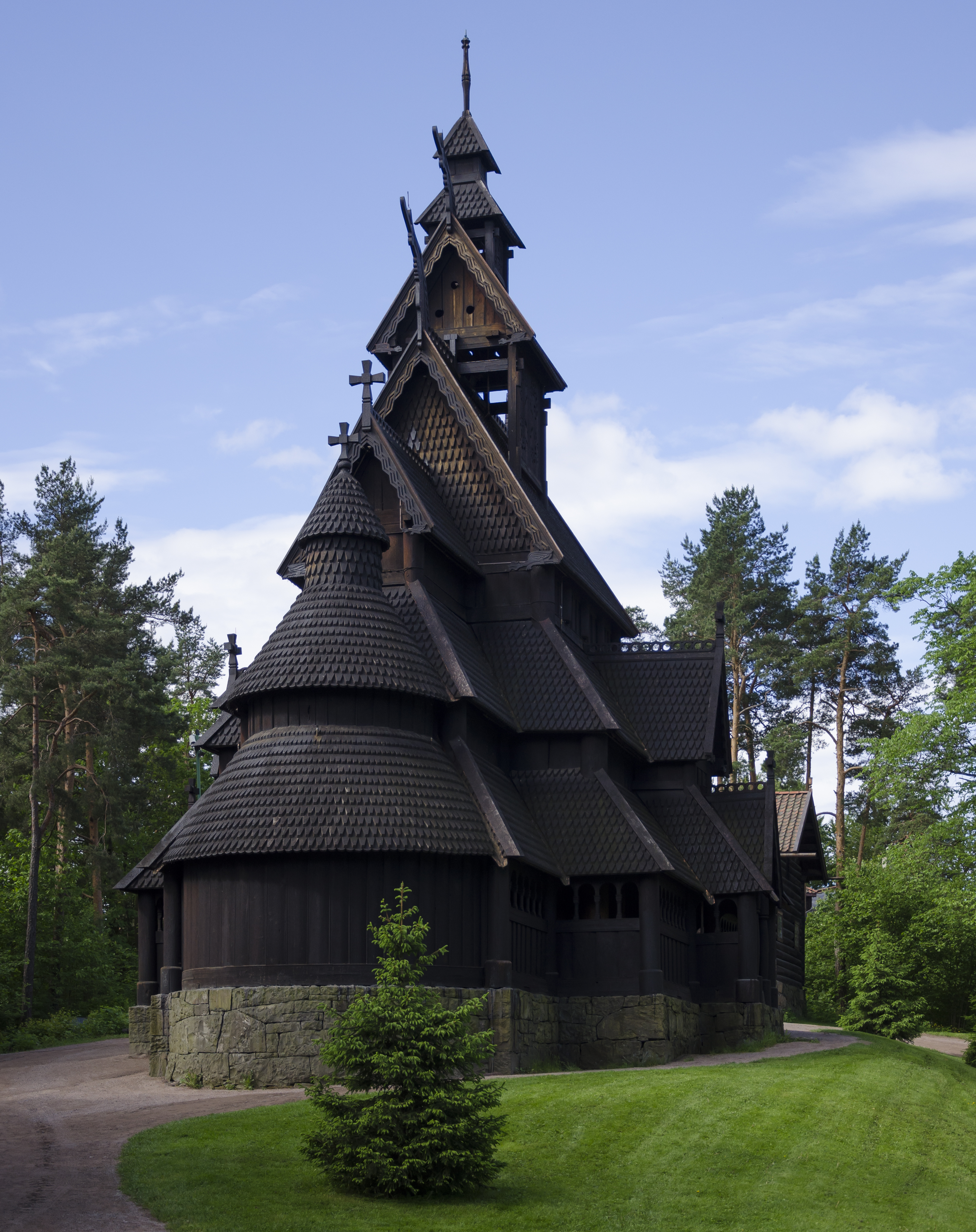

The church has an archway made with Borgund Stave Church as a model. An earlier hallway around the ship was demolished during the expansion in 1802-03. The church has also probably always had a roof rider. A roof rider of the medieval type with two bells was mentioned in accounts from the 1600s. It was renewed in 1694. The new one probably stood until the move, but it got slate instead of table covering in 1821. It is shown on Prahm's drawing from 1846. The current one is a reconstruction from the 1880s with a model in Borgund Stave Church. The roofs were originally sheet metal and tarred, but in the 1820s were covered with slate.

== Portals ==
The west portal is mostly original, but was cut down in 1823 to make the door open. The door is a reconstruction from 1884 with wrought iron fittings fastened with screws. The portal is carved with leaf vines. Closest to the opening, it has two half-columns. The column shafts are covered with plant ornamentation, and the pattern incorporates crowned male heads. Kites and leaf vines spring from two animal jaws at the bottom next to the half-columns. The ornamentation consists of a central kite, two top kites and two smaller kites on each side plank. As in many other stave churches, it was hinged from inward to outward after the fire in Grue church, and then the portal planks were heavily hewn. The south portal was removed during the expansion in 1802-03, but parts of it were used in the new porch and could be used as points of reference for architect Hansteen's reconstruction. The original Sørportalen is stored in the Norwegian Folk Museum. The choir's south portal was partially preserved, without a wooden shed and was reconstructed during the relocation. It is inserted directly between two profiled wall planks. It is possible that the church originally had the North Portal, since the archway had a screw as over the other portals, but since the sleepers and staves are new, and the north wall walls are incomplete, there are no traces to support this.

== Inventory ==
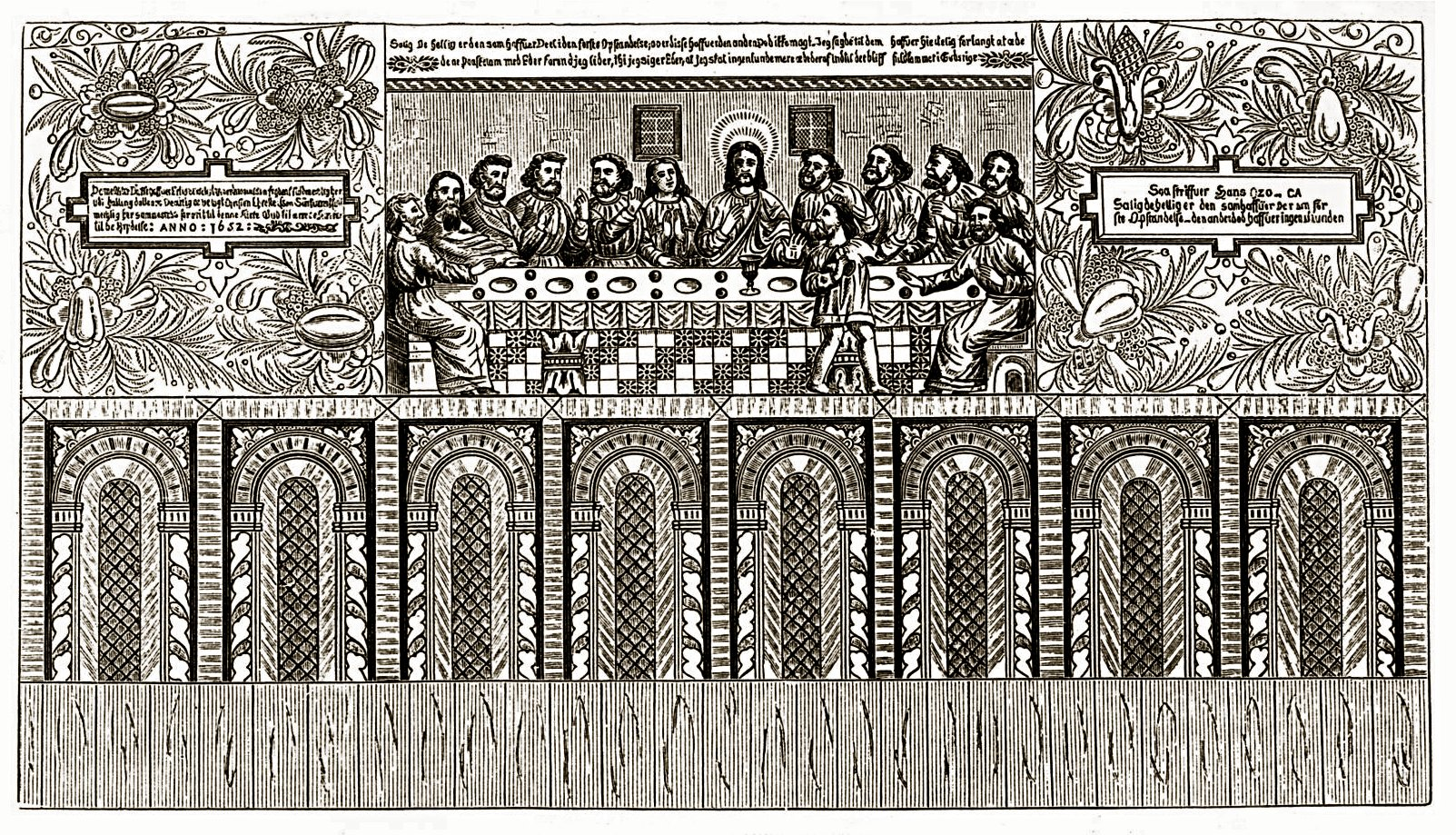
Drawings from Gol Stave Church by Nicolay Nicolaysen

Due to the desire to keep and recreate a medieval church, all post-Reformation furniture was removed, and the interior therefore lacks pews, pulpit and baptismal font. Instead, King Oscar II installed a carved bench from Heddal Stave Church. But the painted decor from 1652 in the choir and the apse survived the relocation and restoration. On the apse wall is a representation of the sacrament, on the north wall of the choir - the four evangelists, and the south wall is divided into fields decorated with leaves, flowers and fruit, and the names of all who paid for the decoration. Above the choir portal previously hung a crucifix that came from Veum Stave Church in Telemark, dated approx. 1300

== Replicas ==
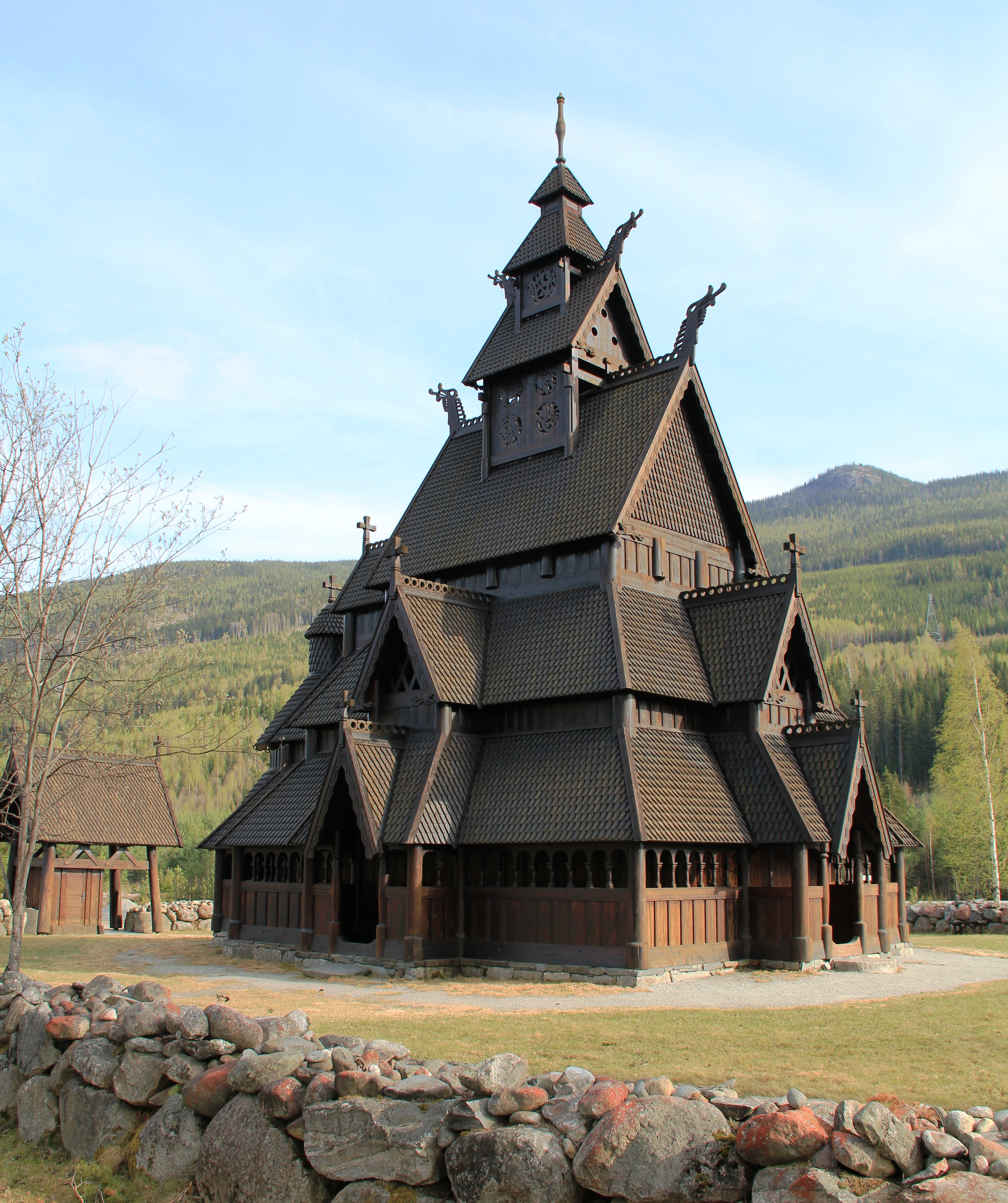
Gol New Stave Church.

As part of Gordarike Family Park in Gol, a faithful copy of the stave church was built in 1995, called Gol New Stave Church. While the original stave church stood high and free up on the mountainside, the copy stands at the bottom of the valley, near the center of Gol. Around the copy, reconstructed Viking Age houses and other elements have been erected.

A replica of Gol Stave Church is also in the Scandinavian Heritage Park in Minot, North Dakota in the United States. In the Norwegian Pavilion in Epcot, Orlando, Gol Stave Church is Norway's landmark.

Another copy, known as Stavkirka on Savjord, is in Beiarn in Nordland. Construction was privately funded and began in 2005. It was completed in 2008. This church has a somewhat smaller scale than the original.

== Gallery ==
Old and modern photos

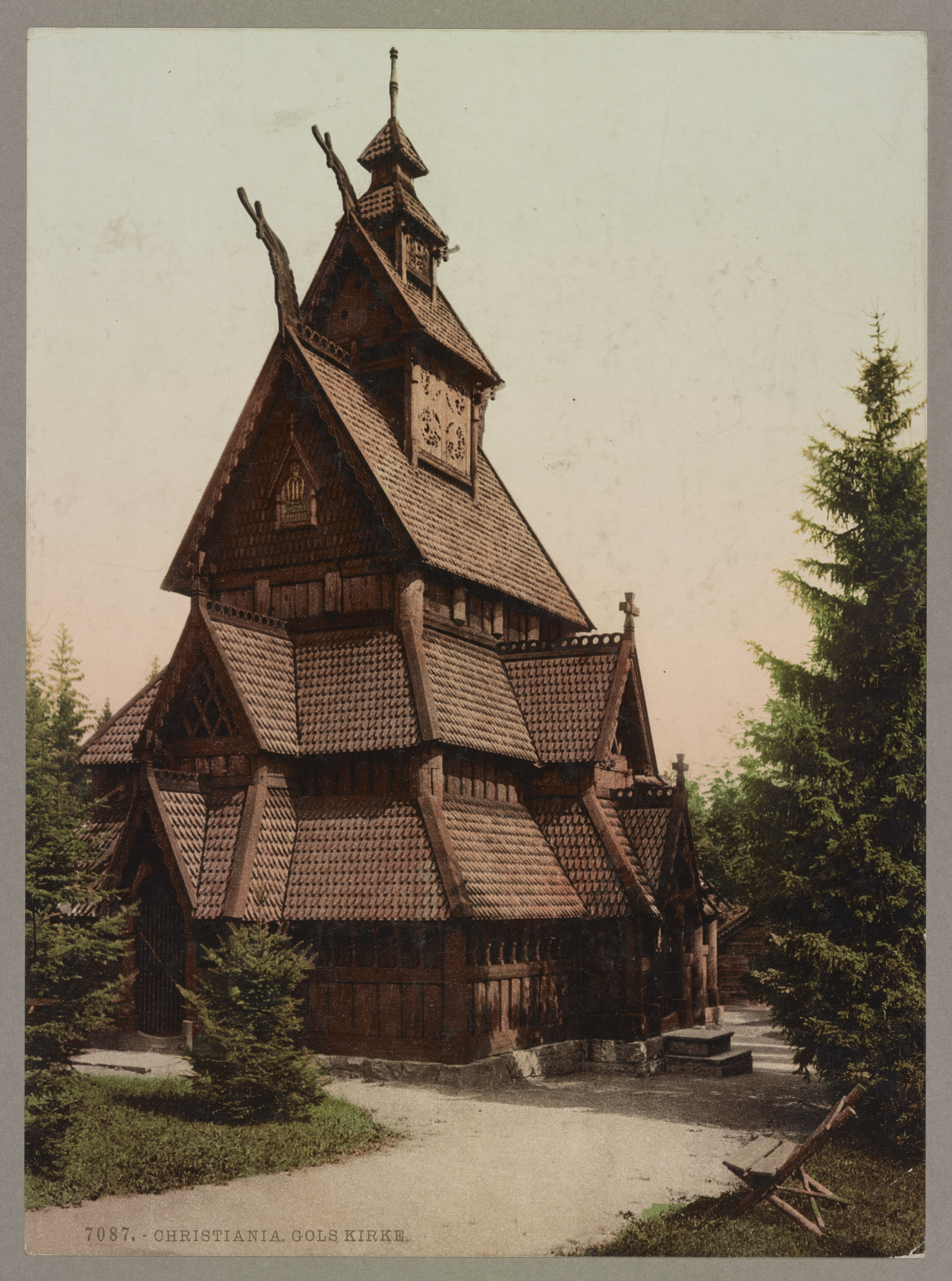

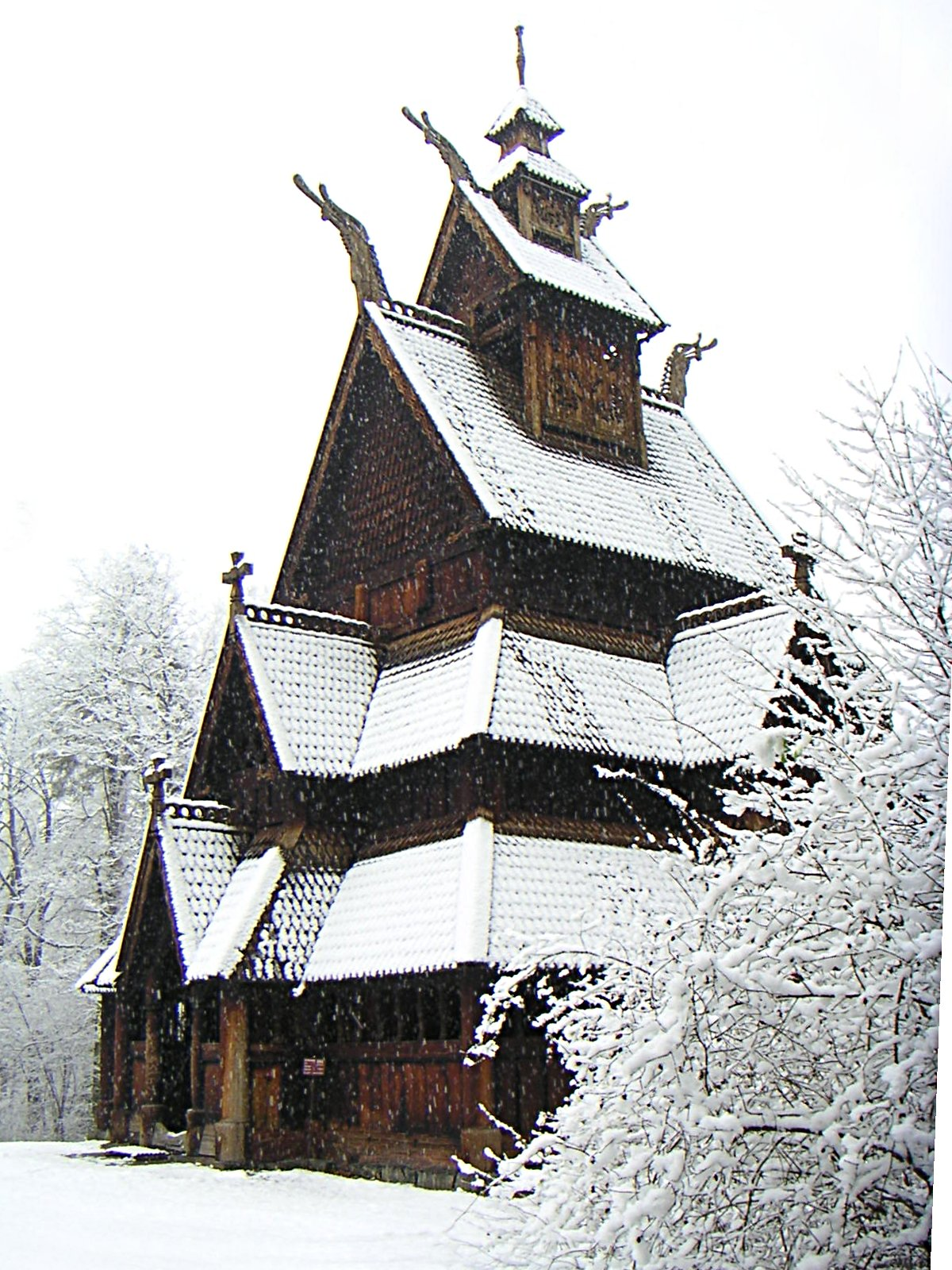

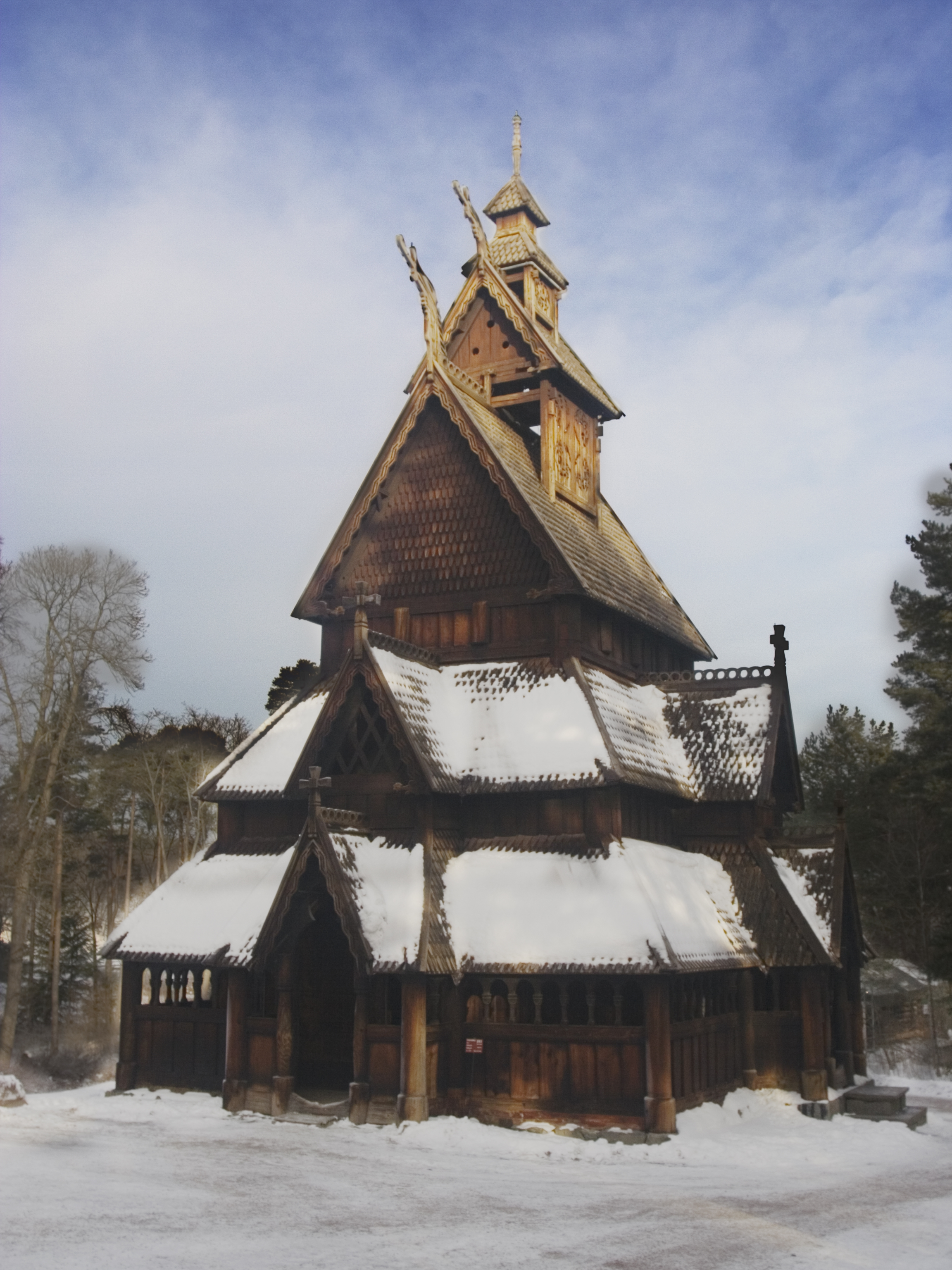
Details

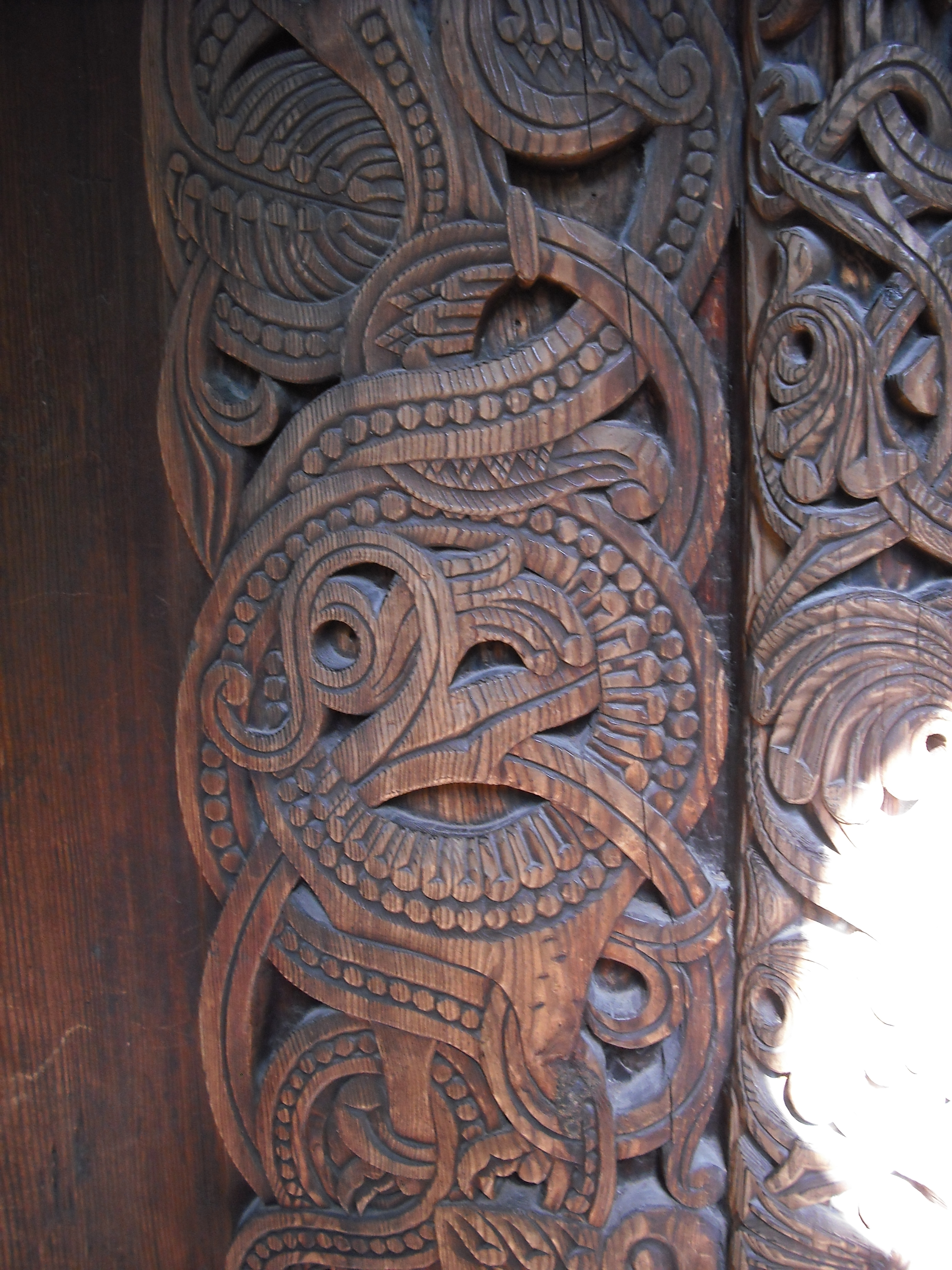
Carving detail

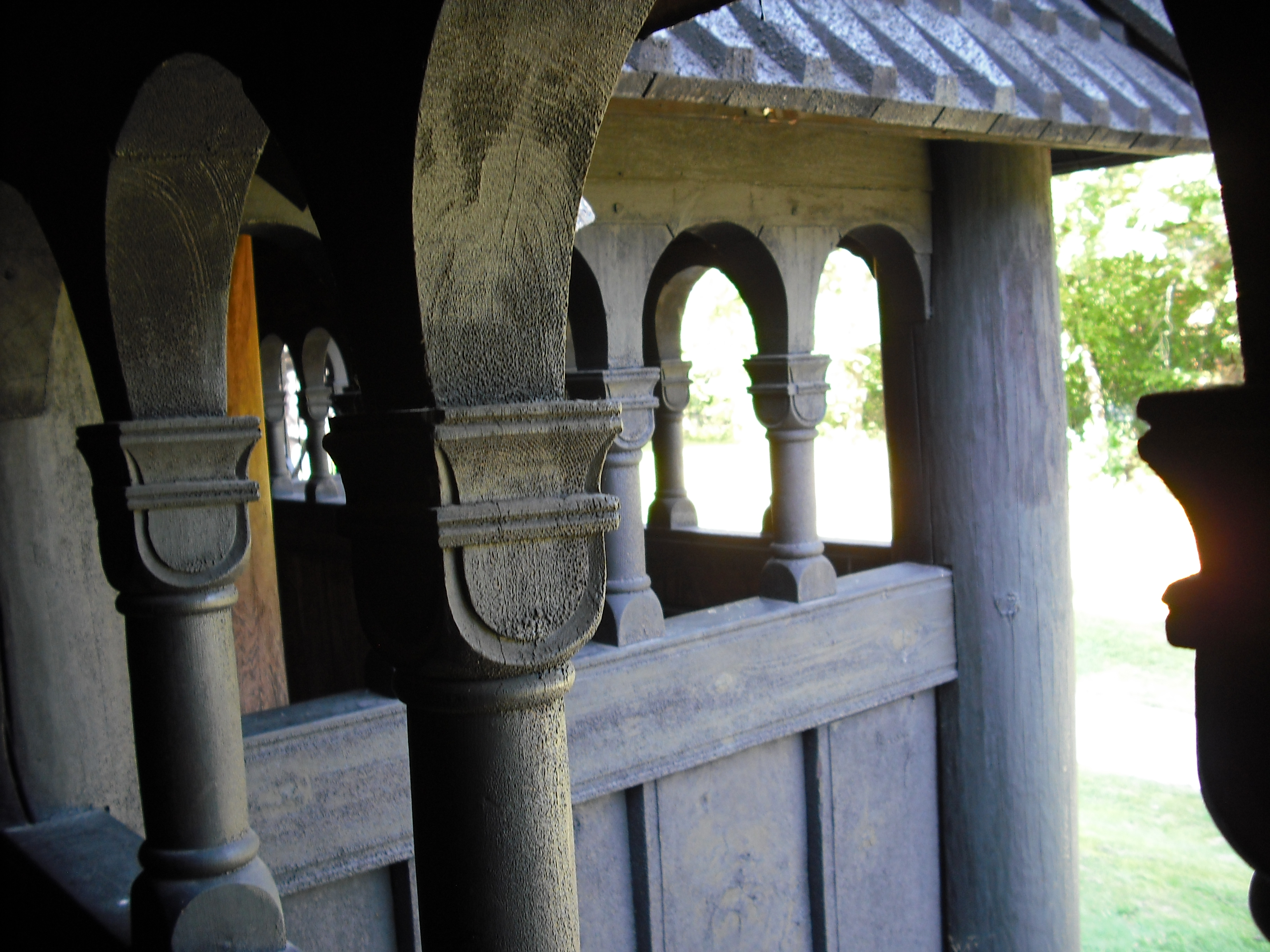
Exterior detail

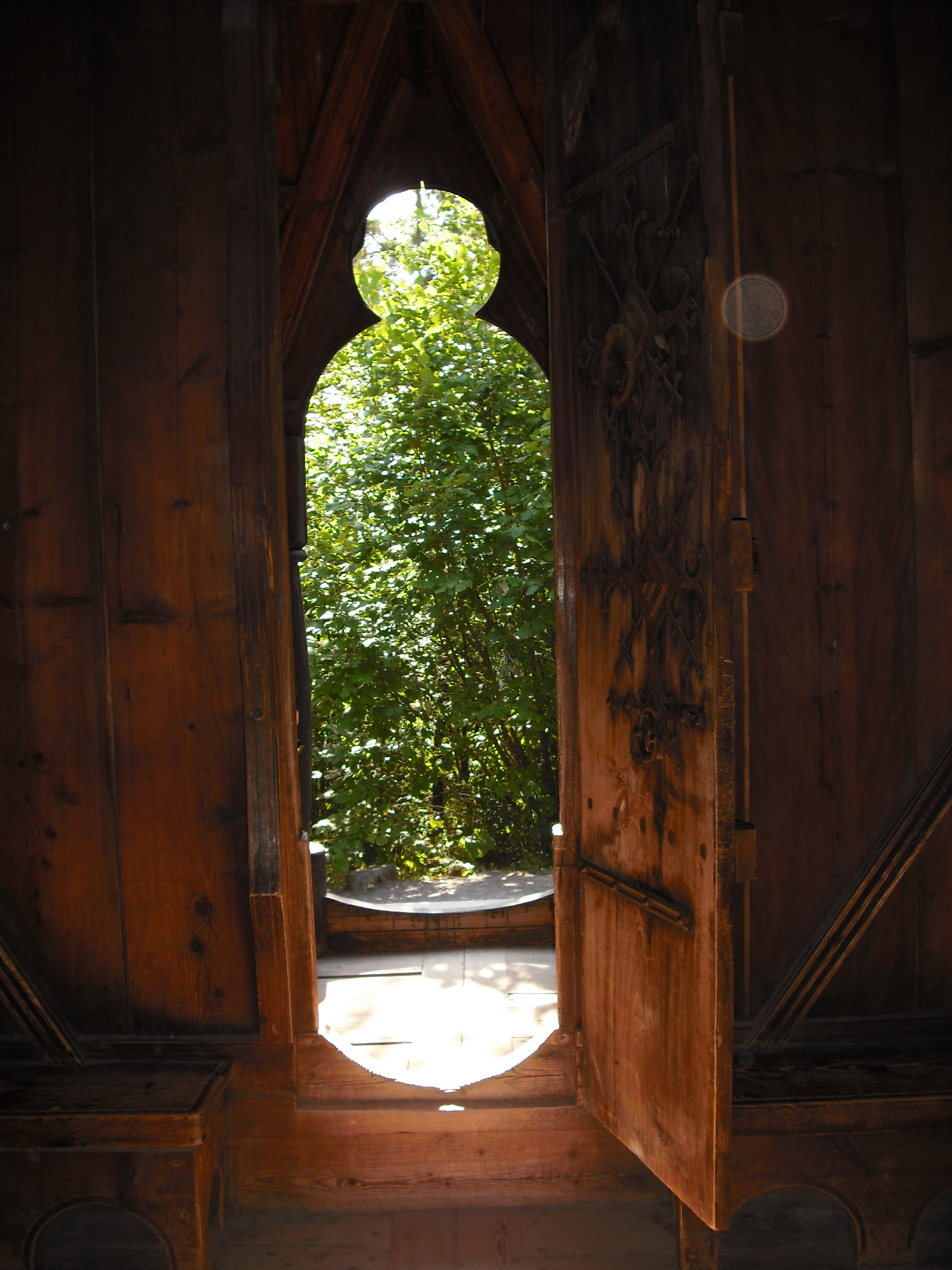
Doorway detail

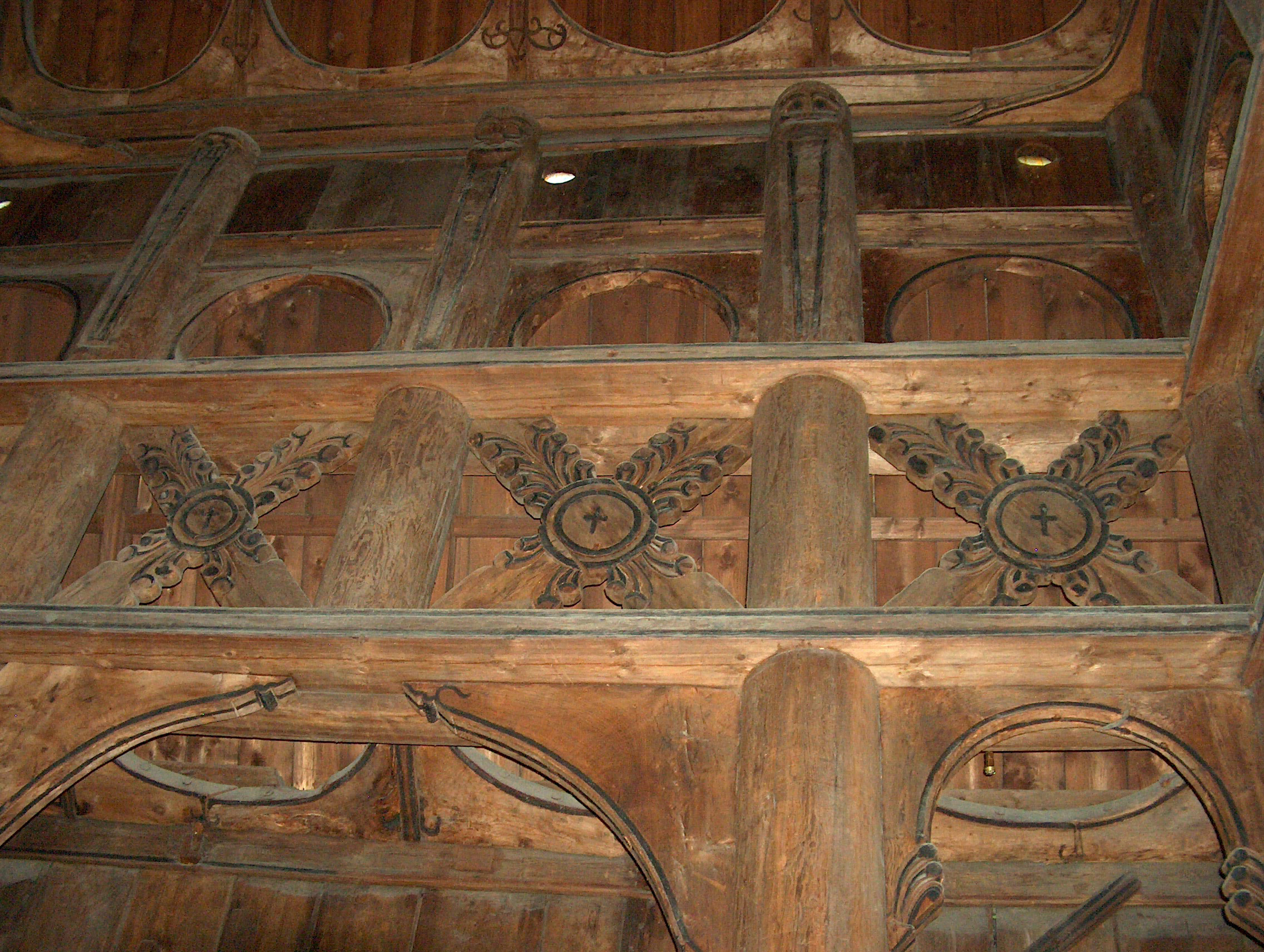
Carving detail

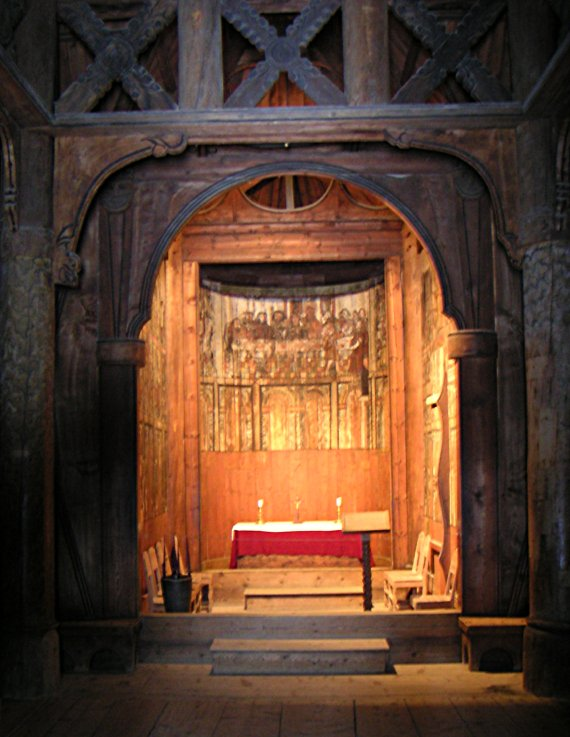
Interior

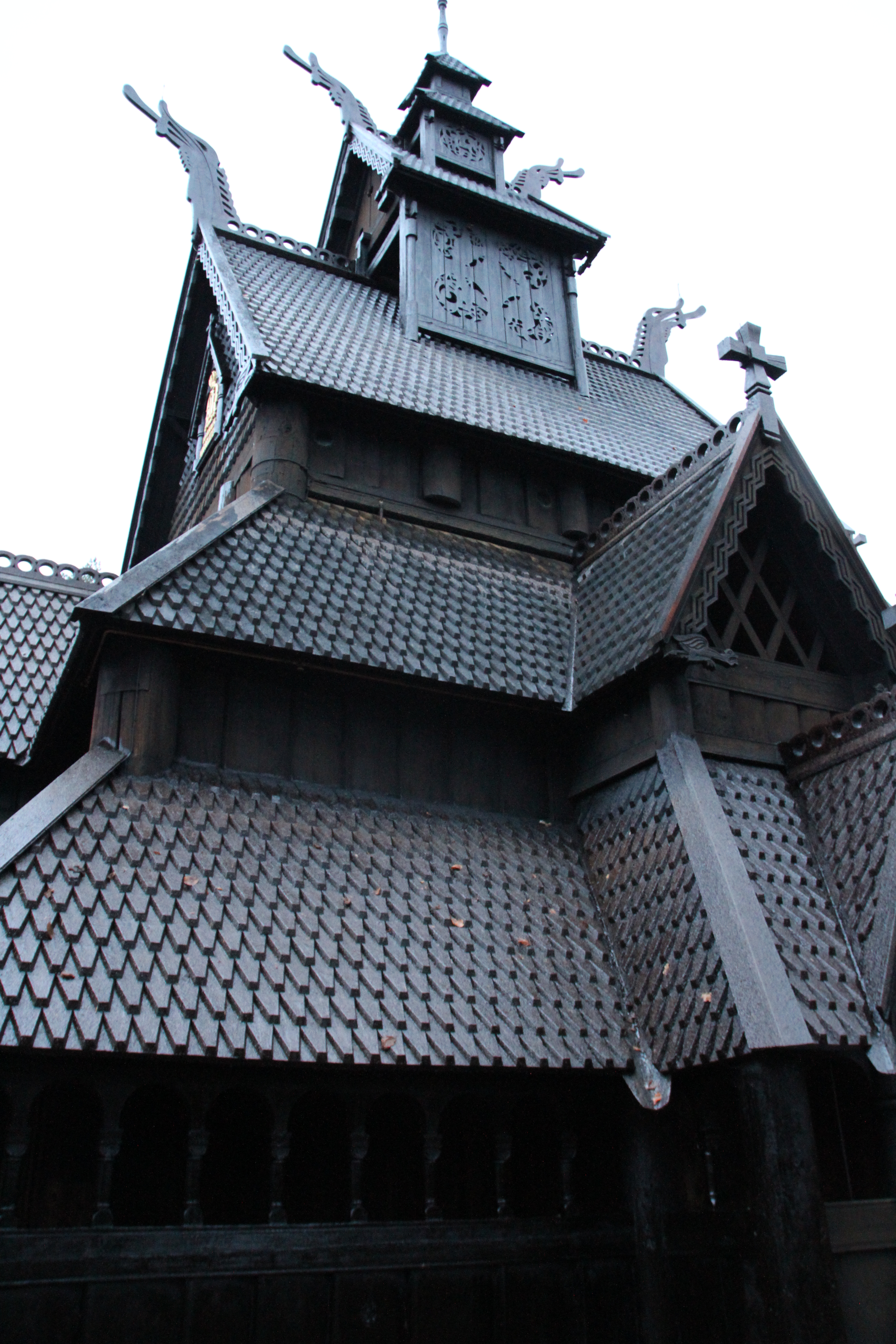
Roof section

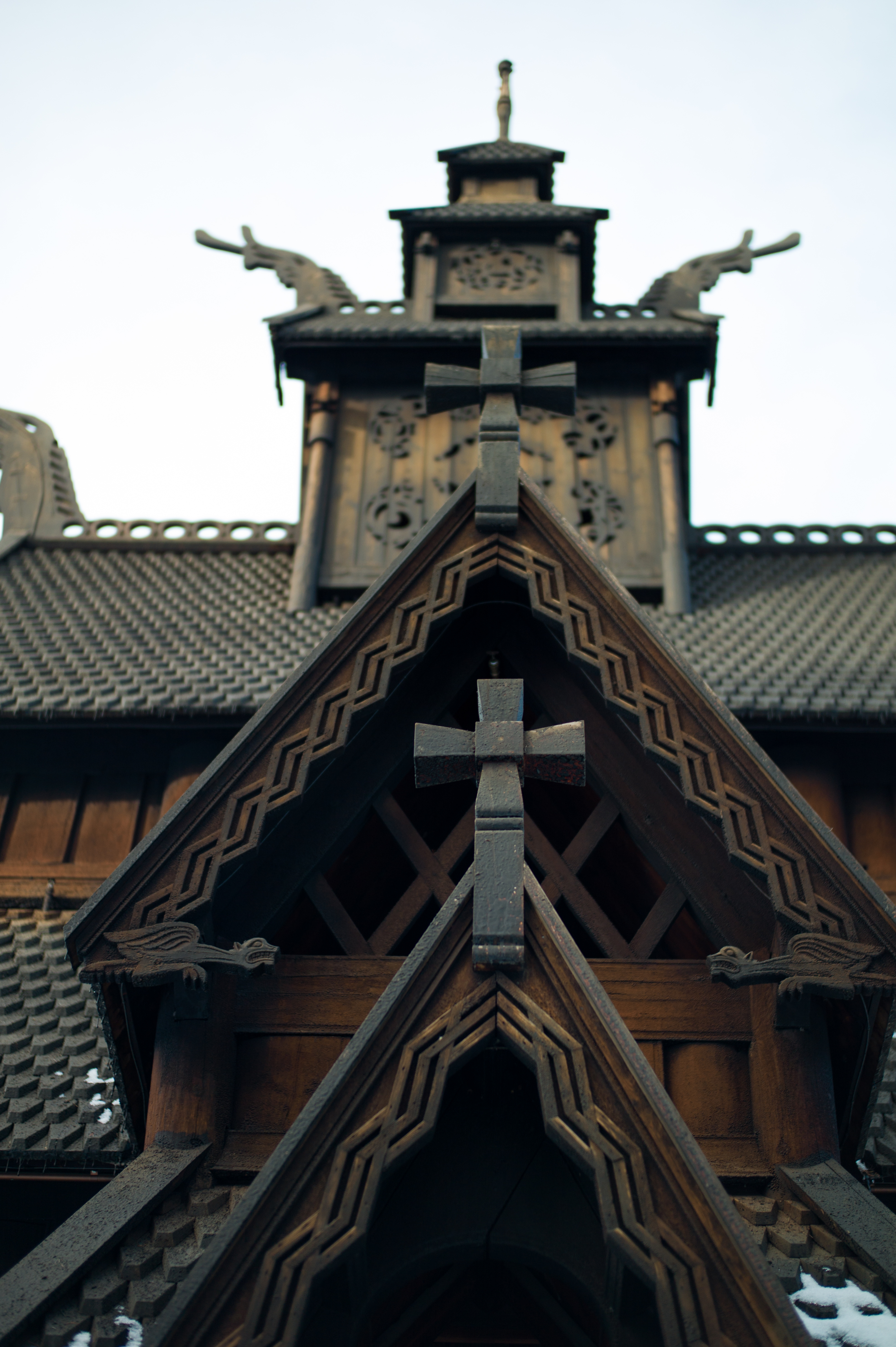
Exterior detail

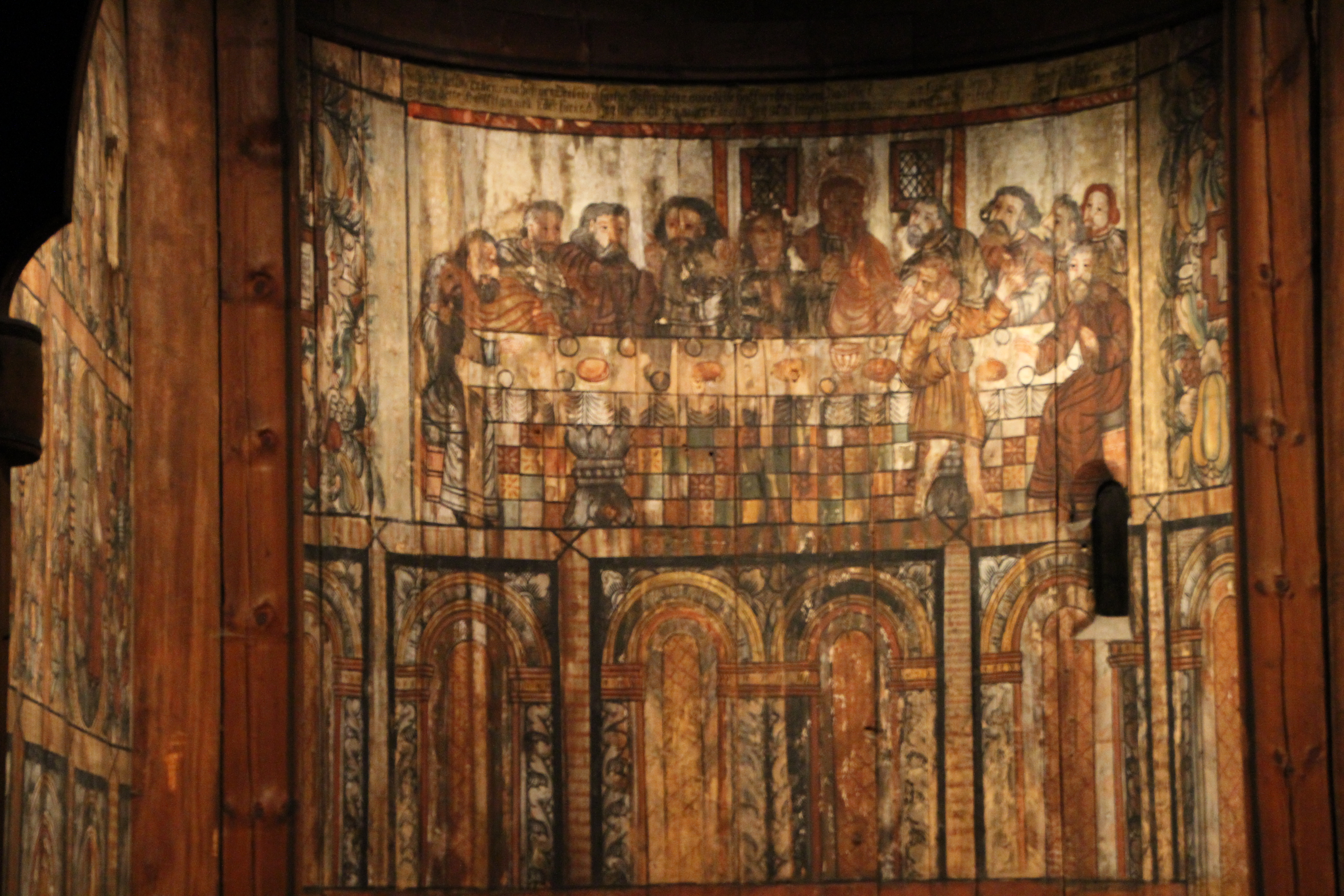
Interior mural

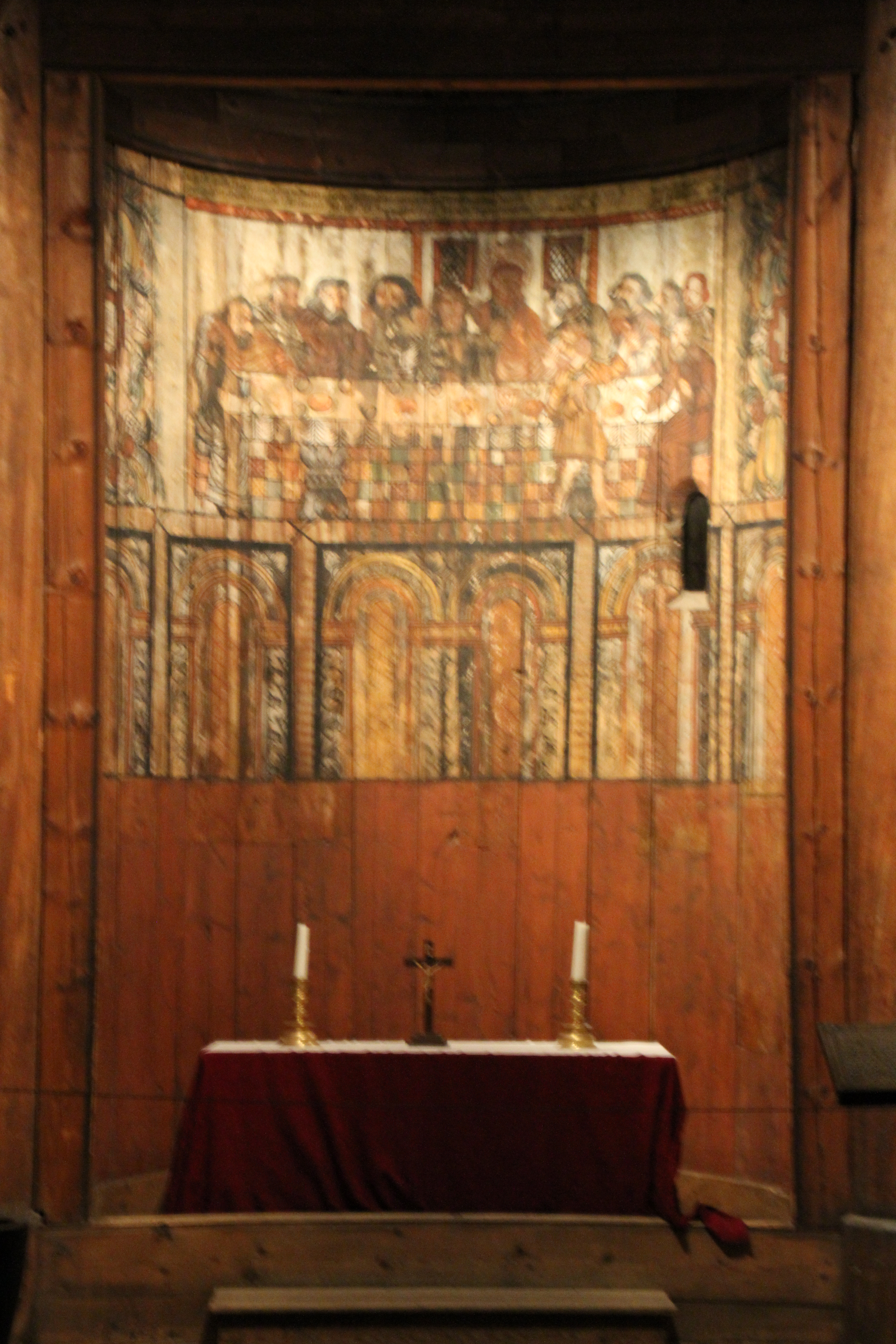
Altar
