= Lilly Heber =

Norwegian literary historian and magazine editor

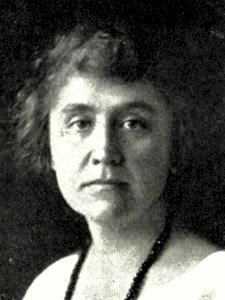
- Born: Olivia Johanne Dorothea Hansen; 28 May 1879; Gol, Norway
- Died: 17 March 1944 (aged 64)
- Education: University of Oslo
- Occupations: historian and literary critic, novelist and magazine editor

Lilly Heber (28 May 1879 – 17 March 1944) was a Norwegian literary critic and historian, novelist and magazine editor.

She was born in Gol to dean Andreas Emil Hansen and Anna Judith Sørensen.

She graduated as dr.phil. from the University of Oslo in 1915. Her publications include Camilla Collett (1913 or 1914), Norsk realisme i 1830- og 40-aarene (thesis from 1914), Det dages (novel, 1918) Det nye som gror (1921), a biography of Alvilde Prydz (1925), a biography of Annie Besant (1927), Glimt av en ny idéverden (1930), and Krishnamurti og vår tids krise (1933). She edited the magazine Stjernen from 1922 to 1928, and from 1929 the magazine Nyorientering, an international magazine for the ideas of Jiddu Krishnamurti.

She died on 17 March 1944.
