= Gol, Norway =

Gol Municipality Gol kommune
- Municipality
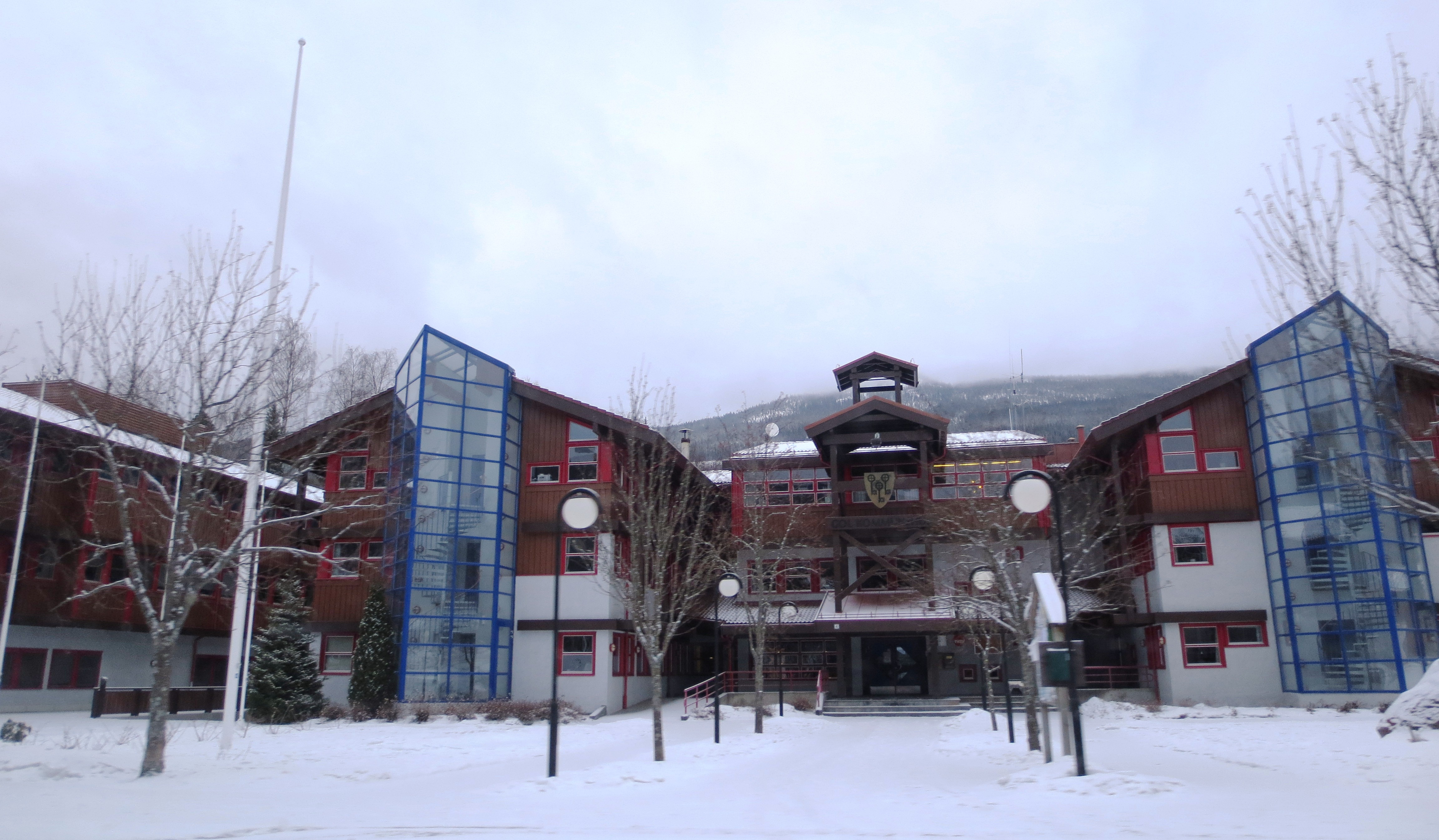

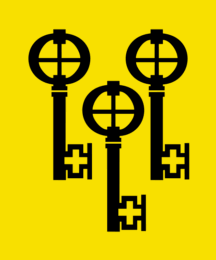
- Flag Coat of arms

- Buskerud within Norway

- Gol within Buskerud
- Coordinates: 60°45′1″N 8°59′5″E
- Country: Norway
- County: Buskerud
- District: Hallingdal
- Administrative centre: Gol

Government
  - Mayor (2003): Jan-Halvard Brekko (Ap)

Area
  - Total: 533 km^{2} (206 sq mi)
  - Land: 514 km^{2} (198 sq mi)
  - Rank: #200 in Norway

Population (2004)
  - Total: 4,372
  - Rank: #218 in Norway
  - Density: 8/km^{2} (21/sq mi)
  - Change (10 years): ▲ +1.4%
- Demonym: Goling

Official language
  - Norwegian form: Nynorsk
- Time zone: UTC+01:00 (CET)
  - Summer (DST): UTC+02:00 (CEST)
- ISO 3166 code: NO-3324
- Website: Official website

Gol is a municipality in Buskerud county, Norway. It is part of the traditional region of Hallingdal. The administrative center of the municipality is the village of Gol which is also the main population center.

Gol was established as a municipality on 1 January 1838 (see formannskapsdistrikt). The area of Hemsedal was separated from Gol in 1897 to become a separate municipality. The municipality of Gol is bordered to the north by Nord-Aurdal Municipality (in Innlandet county), to the east by Sør-Aurdal Municipality (in Innlandet county), to the south by Nesbyen Municipality, and to the west by Ål Municipality and Hemsedal Municipality.

== General information ==
=== Name ===
The Old Norse form of the name was Gǫrð. This is probably an old river name (for the lower part of Hemsil river). The name of the river maybe derived from the word garðr m 'fence; border' - and the meaning is then 'the border river'.

=== Coat-of-arms ===
The coat-of-arms is from modern times. They were granted on 13 September 1985. The arms are gold with three black keys in the center. The keys are derived from the key for Gol stave church.

=== Transport ===
The Bergen Line from Bergen to Oslo runs through Gol Station which opened in 1907. Gol is connected to Norwegian National Road 7, 50 and 52 as well as Norwegian county road 51. There are daily bus connections to Gjøvik and Lillehammer.

Number of minorities (1st and 2nd generation) in Gol by country of origin in 2017
Ancestry	Number
Poland	131
Somalia	77
Lithuania	56
Syria	46
Iraq	30

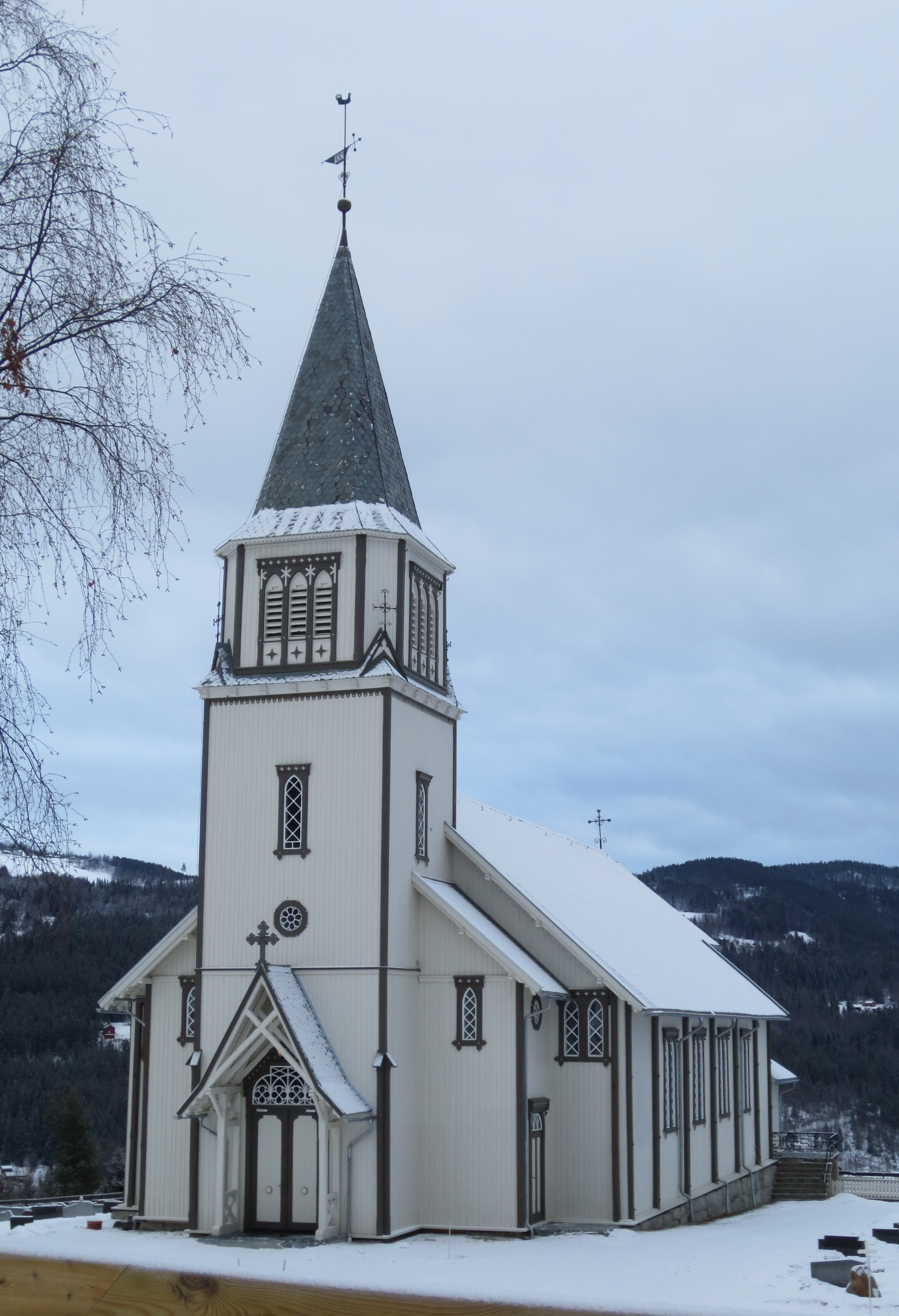
Gol Church

== Gol Church ==
Gol Church (Gol kirke) was constructed during 1882 based upon a design by architect Henrik Nissen. The church is characterized by neo-Gothic style with gables and small towers with crosses. It was built of wood and has 500 seats.

The mediaeval Gol stave church (built ca. 1216) was due for demolition after the construction of the larger and new church. Gol stave church was saved from destruction by the Society for the Preservation of Ancient Norwegian Monuments (Fortidsminneforeningen), which bought the materials with the intention of re-erecting the church elsewhere. Financial problems were solved when King Oscar II decided to pay for its relocation and restoration as the central building of his private open-air museum near Oslo.

The restoration was overseen by architect Waldemar Hansteen. It was completed in 1885. In 1907, the royal museum was merged with the Norsk Folkemuseum, which now manages the stave church, still nominally belonging to the reigning monarch.

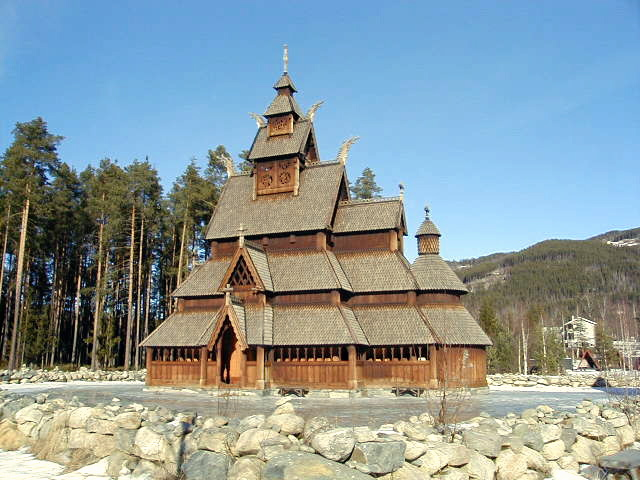
Gol Stave Church replica

== Attractions ==
- Gordarike Familiepark is a theme park located in downtown Gol. The theme and environment are built to reflect the Viking Age and Middle Ages. A modern replica of Gol stave church has been built as a tourist attraction at the park. The replica was built in the 1980s and consecrated in 1994.
- Gol Bygdetun is an open-air museum located in the village of Gol. It was built around the old Skaga farm. It is dedicated to the cultural history of Gol, and contains farm buildings of nearly all types. Barns, lofts and wooden stables are all featured together with a millhouse, a school house and a log cabin. The oldest building dates back to 17th century. Gol Bygdetun is a subsidiary of Hallingdal Museum which operating in association with Buskerudmuseet.

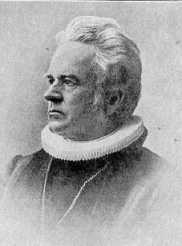
Johan Willoch Erichsen

== Notable residents ==
- Bjørn Frøysåk (1634 in Gol – 1709) a Norwegian farmer and merchant.
- Johan Willoch Erichsen (1842–1916 in Gol) a Norwegian Bishop of Bjørgvin
- Lilly Heber (1879 in Gol – 1944) Norwegian literary critic and historian
- Hans Johan Jensen (1882–1950) a Norwegian politician, farmer and carpenter
- Sigrun Eng (born 1951 in Sør-Fron) a Norwegian politician, member of Gol municipal council 1983 to 1991
- Inga Ibsdotter Lilleaas (born 1989 in Gol), a Norwegian actress.
- Pål Golberg (born 1990 in Gol) is a Norwegian cross-country skier

== Sister cities ==
The following cities are twinned with Gol:

- - Årjäng, Värmland County, Sweden
- - Fanø, Region Syddanmark, Denmark
- - Virrat, Pirkanmaa, Finland
- (Canada) - Bracebridge, Ontario

== Gallery ==
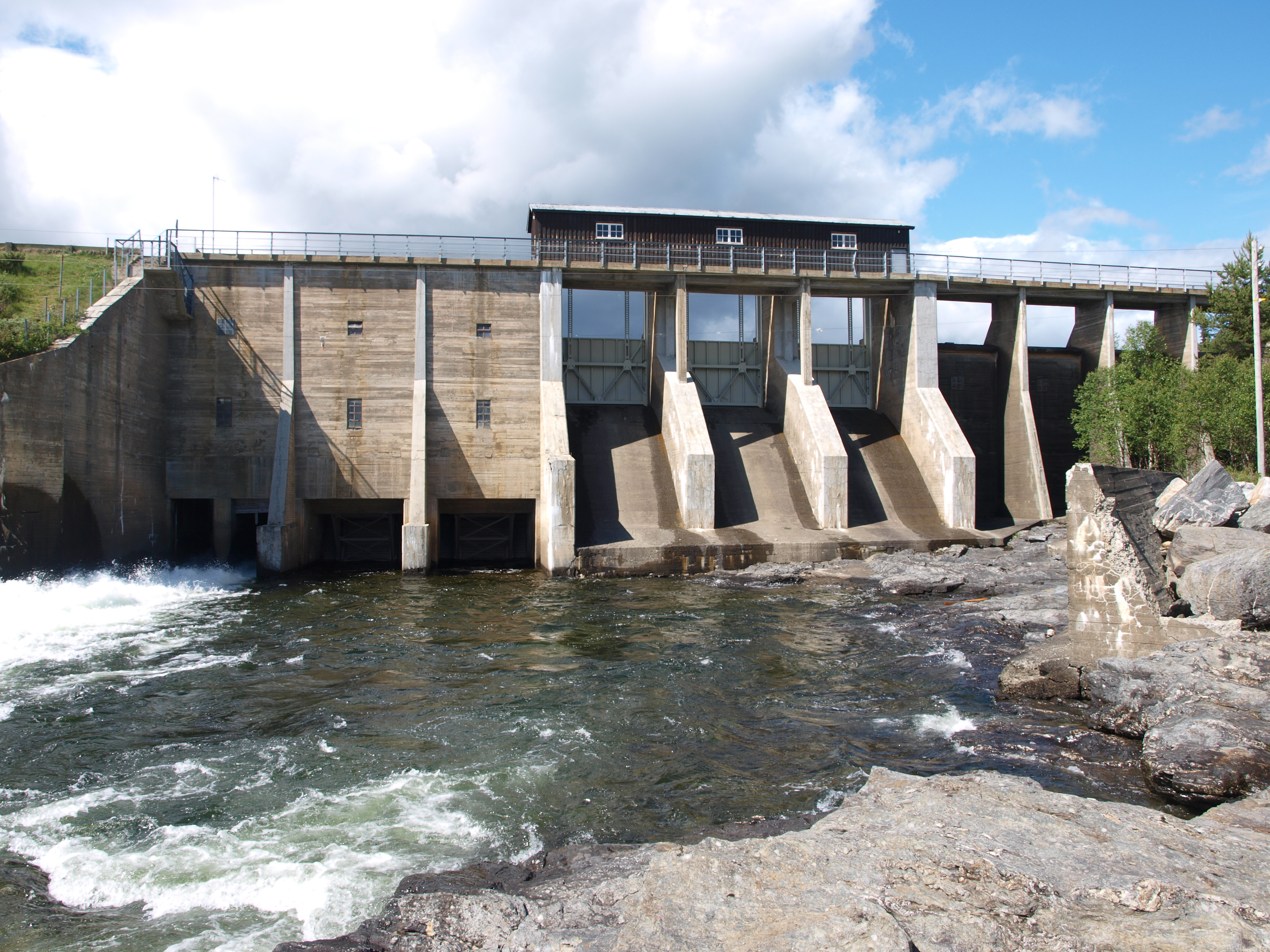
Tisleifjorden Dam

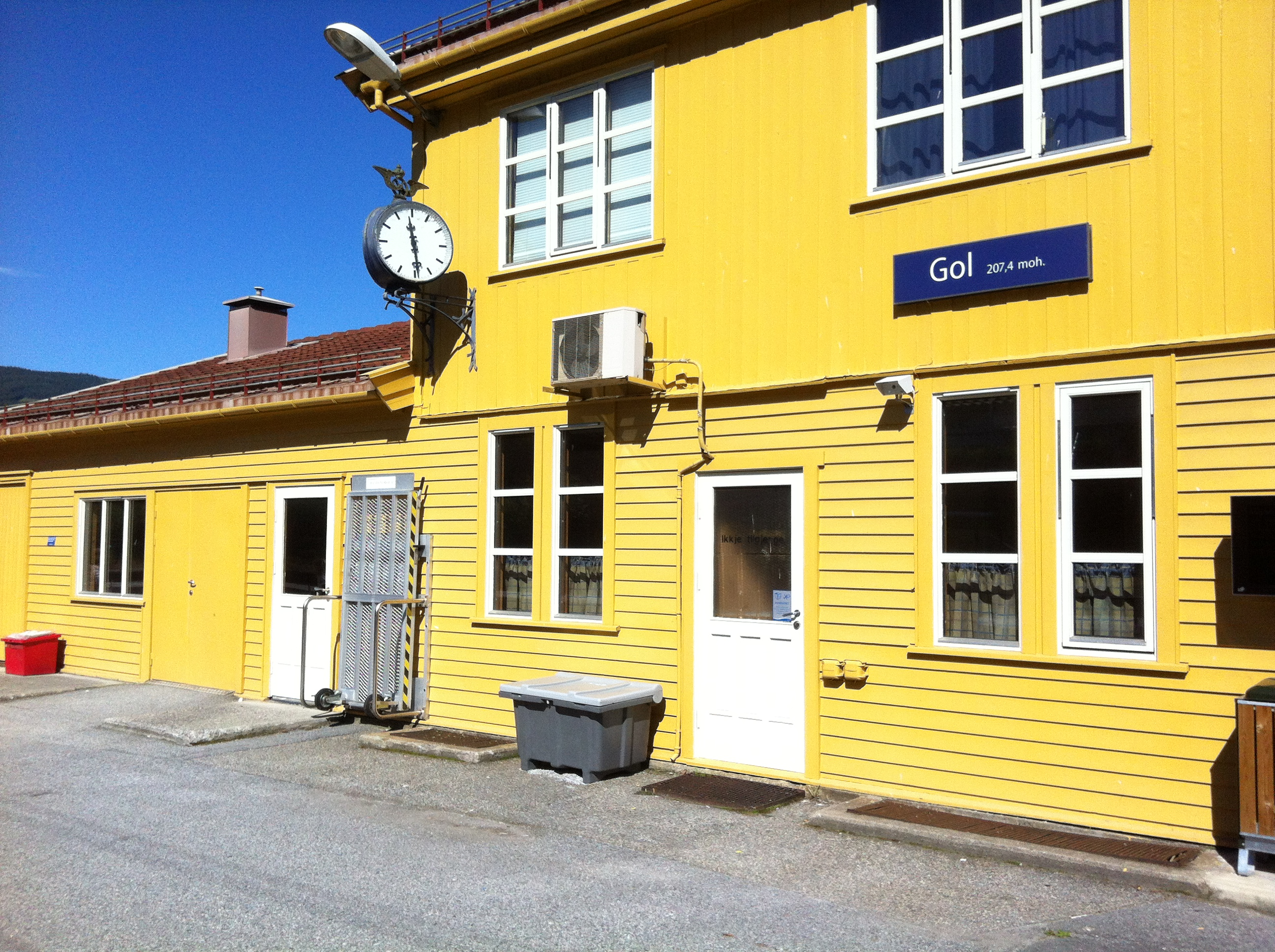
Gol Train Station

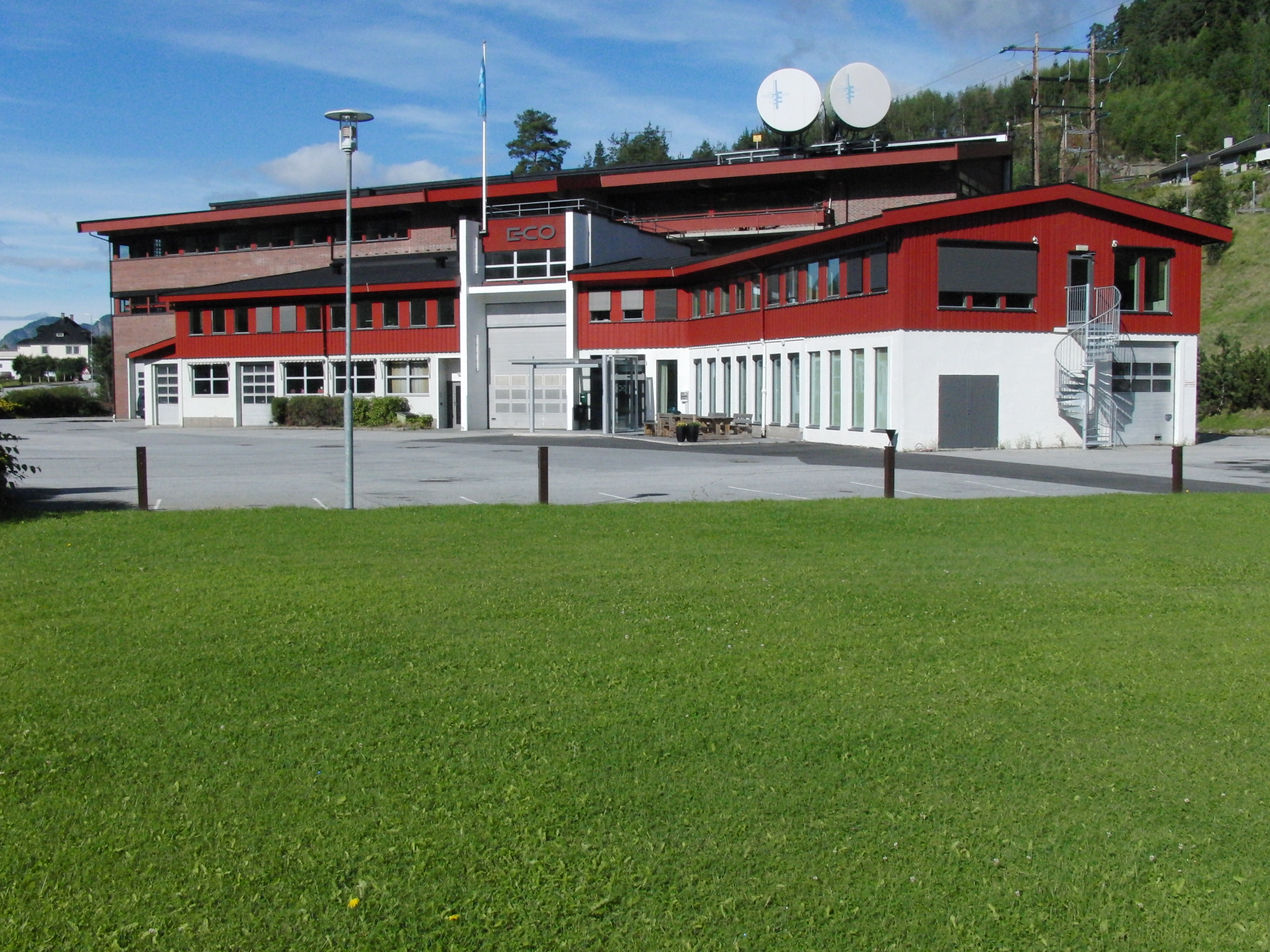
Hemsil II Kraftverk

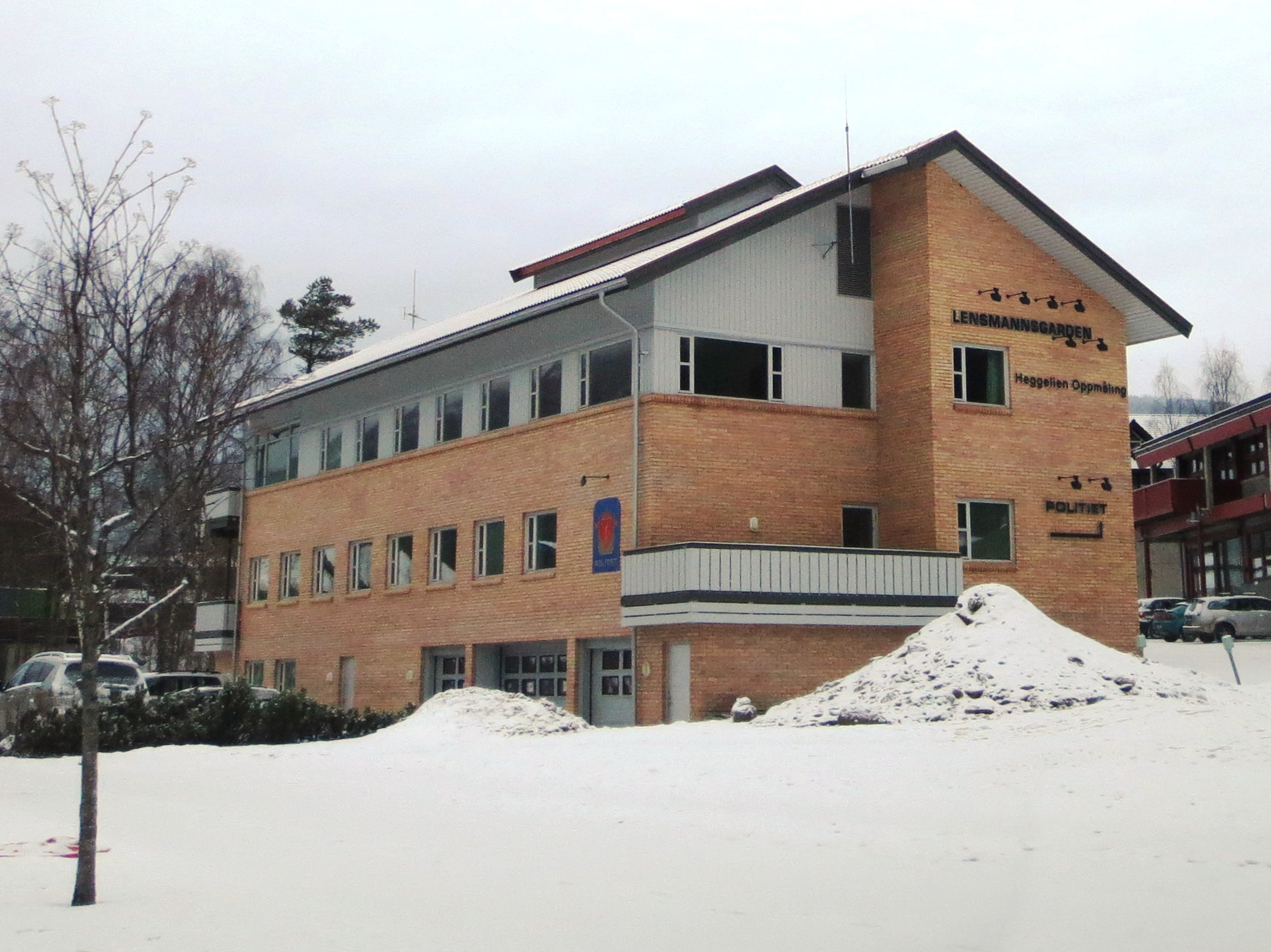
Gol Police Station
