= Skien Church =

Church in Telemark, Norway

- Skien kirke
- Grenlandskatedralen
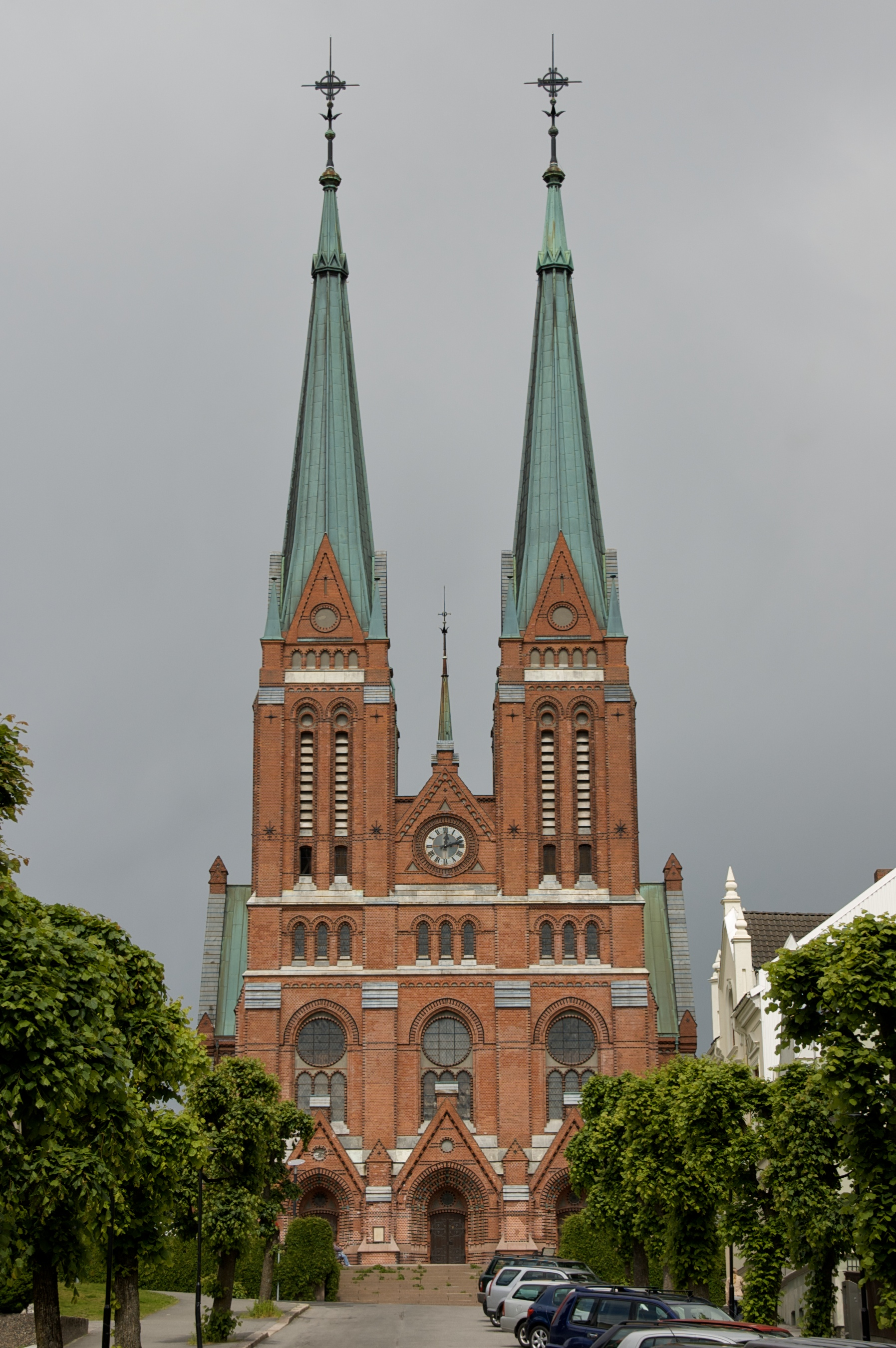
- View of the church
- Skien Church
- 59°12′38″N 9°36′22″E
- Location: Skien Municipality, Telemark
- Country: Norway
- Denomination: Church of Norway
- Previous denomination: Catholic Church
- Churchmanship: Evangelical Lutheran
- Website: www.skienkirke.no

History
- Former name: Skien Cathedral (1940-1945)
- Status: Parish church
- Founded: 13th century
- Consecrated: 31 August 1894

Architecture
- Functional status: Active
- Architect: H.M. Schytte-Berg
- Architectural type: Cruciform
- Style: Neo Gothic / Jugendstil
- Completed: 1894 (132 years ago)

Specifications
- Capacity: 1050
- Materials: Brick

Administration
- Diocese: Agder og Telemark
- Deanery: Skien prosti
- Parish: Skien
- Norwegian Cultural Heritage Site
- Type: Church
- Status: Listed
- ID: 85454

Skien Church (Norwegian: Skien kirke) is a parish church of the Church of Norway in Skien Municipality in Telemark county, Norway. It is located in the town of Skien. It is the church for the Skien parish which is part of the Skien prosti (deanery) in the Diocese of Agder og Telemark. The red brick church was built in a cruciform design in 1894 using plans drawn up by the architect Hagbarth Martin Schytte-Berg. The church seats about 1,050 people.

== Building ==
The church is 47 metres (154 ft) long with a tower height of 68 metres (223 ft) for two twin towers, and the interior height is 17 metres (56 ft). The church is shaped like a Latin cross where it stands on a ridge overlooking the harbour, which reinforces the effect of the sky-reaching towers. The church cost 415,000 kr (in 1894) to build.

The organ in Skien Church is one of the largest in Norway with over 5000 pipes. Skien Church has a combination of Neo-Gothic pointed arches and circular arches. In the chancel arch we see the arch, transept has also pointed arches at the top, while the galleries and the longitudinal side ships have round arches. The artistic decoration in Skien Church is primarily characterized by stained-glass windows in the choir, transept, baptism sacristy, and the ornamentation on the walls and ceilings.

The church was built in 1894 on the basis of the possible expectation that Telemark county would become its own diocese within the Church of Norway. This church would become a seat of a bishop and that the new church was to become Cathedral, but this did not occur. During World War II the diocese was created by the occupation Quisling government, and this church was called Skien Cathedral during the war and the Quisling government. After the war, the former geographical division of dioceses was reinstated.

== History ==
=== Medieval building ===
The earliest existing historical records of the church date back to the year 1400, but the church was not built that year. The first church in Skien was a stone church that was possibly built during the 13th century. The church was located closer to the harbour, about 350 metres (1,150 ft) to the southeast of the present church site. The original site was on a hill, about 6 metres (20 ft) above the rest of the town. The church had a 6-by-7-metre (20 ft × 23 ft) choir and an 11 by 11 metres (36 ft × 36 ft) nave.

=== Second building ===
In 1777, there was a fire in Skien which burned down the old church. The professor and architect Jørgen Henrich Rawert was commissioned to build a new church. He designed a stone cruciform building. The new church was nicknamed Christianskirken, after the current King of Denmark-Norway, Christian VII. This building was Rawert's first monumental work in Norway. As a model for the interior, he has used the 20-year-old Kongsberg Church. The new building took over six years to build. Throughout the project the expected soared, double what was planned, so a large fundraising campaign was launched to pay for the project. The church was built as a cruciform church with a massive tower in the middle. The tower did not have a spire, but instead a tower cap crowned by a cross. The new church had seating for about 1,176 people. There were beautiful windows with white curtains with red fringes and tassels. The altar, altarpiece, pulpit, and organ were placed one above the other in a so-called pulpit altar setup. The altarpiece was a painting depicting the burial of Christ.

In 1886, a fire broke out again in the town of Skien, and the church burned again and it was not salvageable. The only items saved were the baptismal font (made by the sculptor Ole Henriksen), the holy vessels, two gilded wooden figures Troen and Haabet (made by carver Jacob Christian Holler), and the altarpiece painting. An interim church was erected at Marensro shortly after the fire. The interim church was used from 1886 until 1894 when the new church was finally completed. Afterwards, the interim church was converted to a school building. (The temporary church was demolished by the municipality of Skien on 31 March 2011 - see photos of the demolition here).

=== Current building ===
Afterwards, an architectural competition was held to design the new church. There was no clear winner, so a second competition was held. That time, Hagbarth Schytte-Berg emerged victorious and was chosen to design the building. The master builder named Lorentz Christian Wagle from Arendal was hired to lead the construction. It was decided to build the church on a new site, about 350 metres (1,150 ft) to the northwest of the old church site. The new church is a neo-Gothic cruciform building in unpolished red brick with tall, slender twin towers at the entrance on the southeast side. The architect's inspiration was taken from the German architects John Vollmer and John Otzens. The new church was consecrated on 31 August 1894 by the Bishop Johan Christian Heuch.

There have been some major maintenance problems with the church over the years. In 1920-1922, some of the facade bricks were replaced. In 1960-1961, there were many cracks in the exterior facade that were repaired. In 1969-1970, the interior of the church was repainted with new colors. In 1985-1987, the foundation was rebuilt under the towers and the nave. In 2004, the exterior brick facade was replaced again.

== Media gallery ==
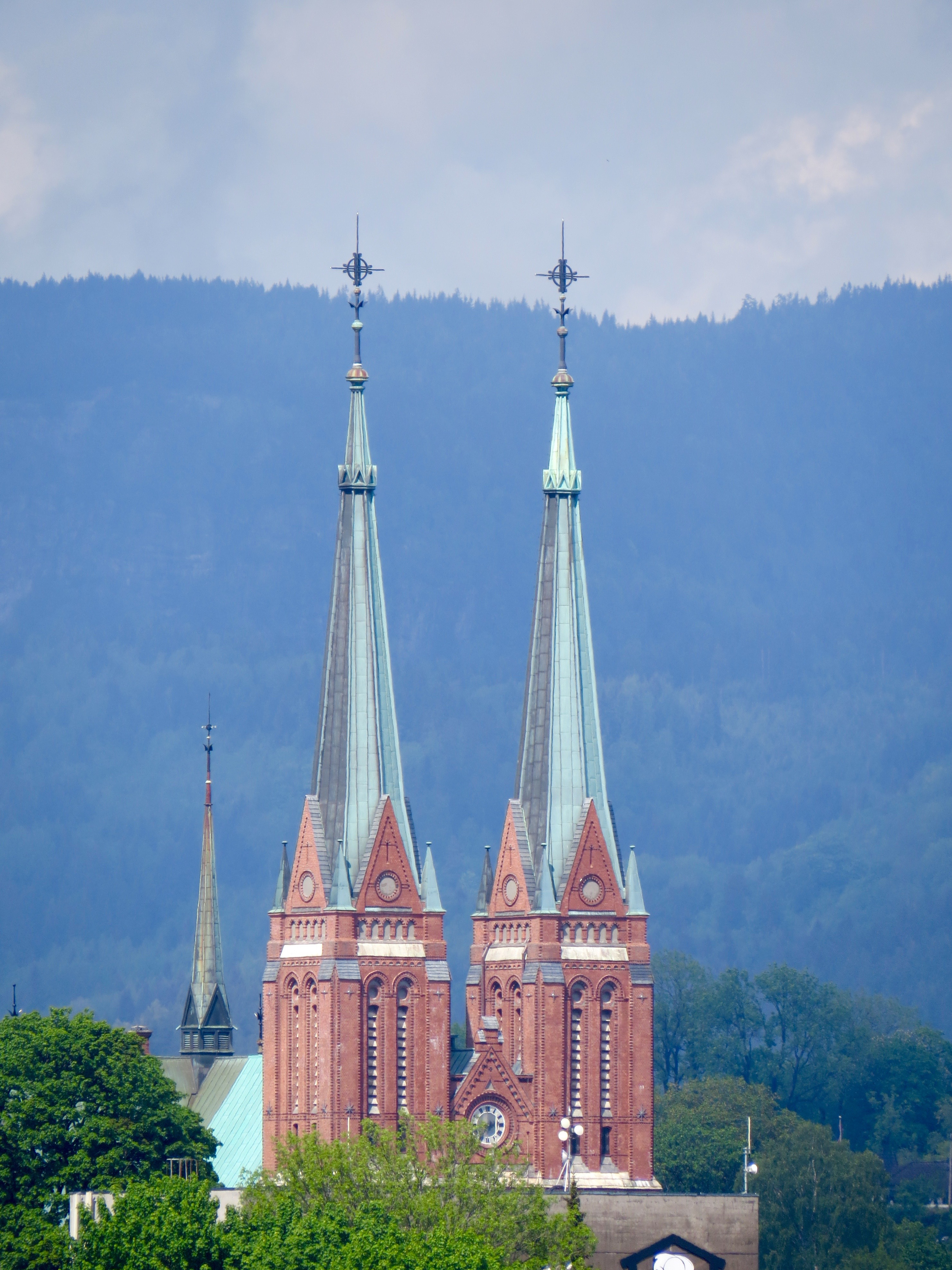
Front facade

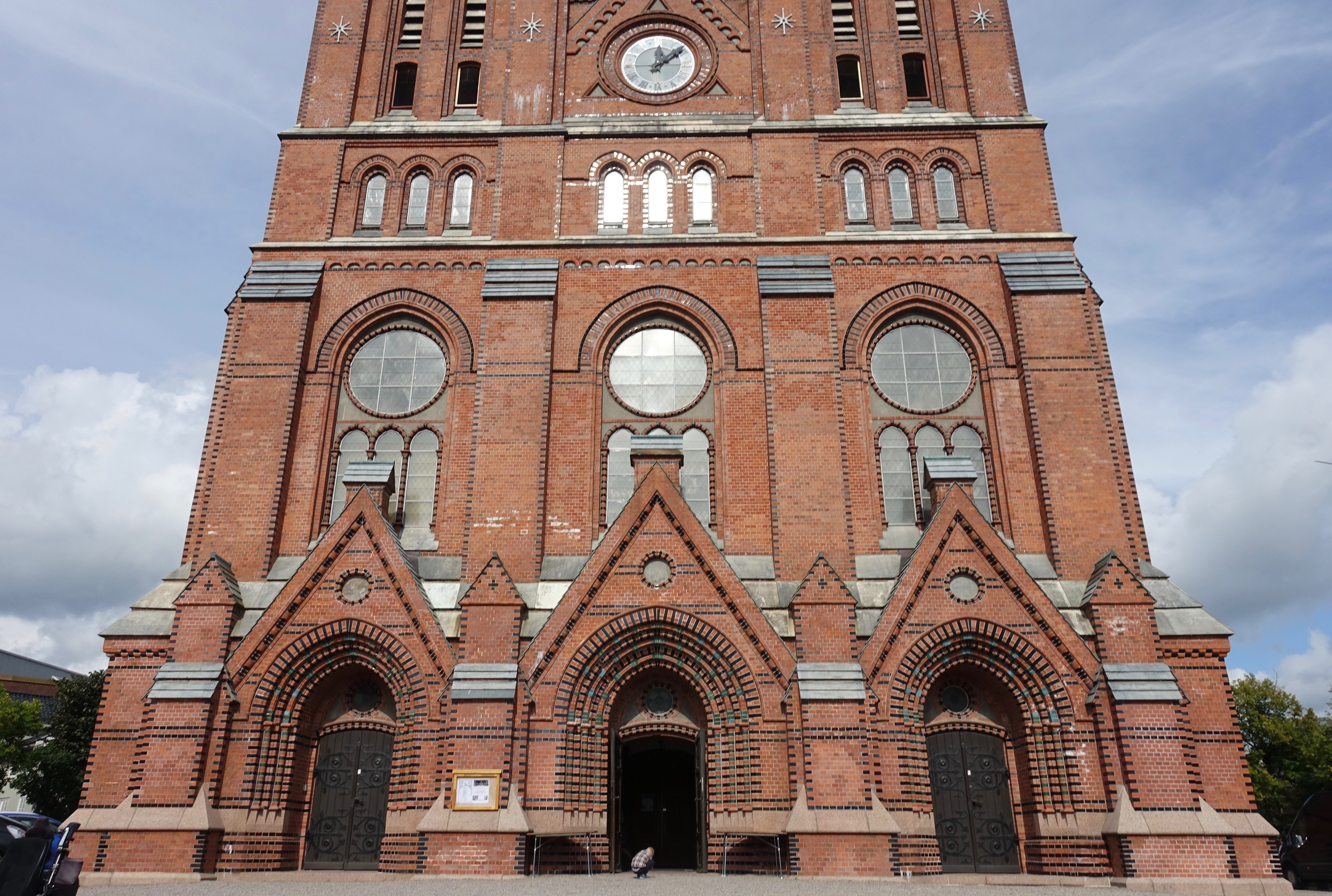
Main entrance

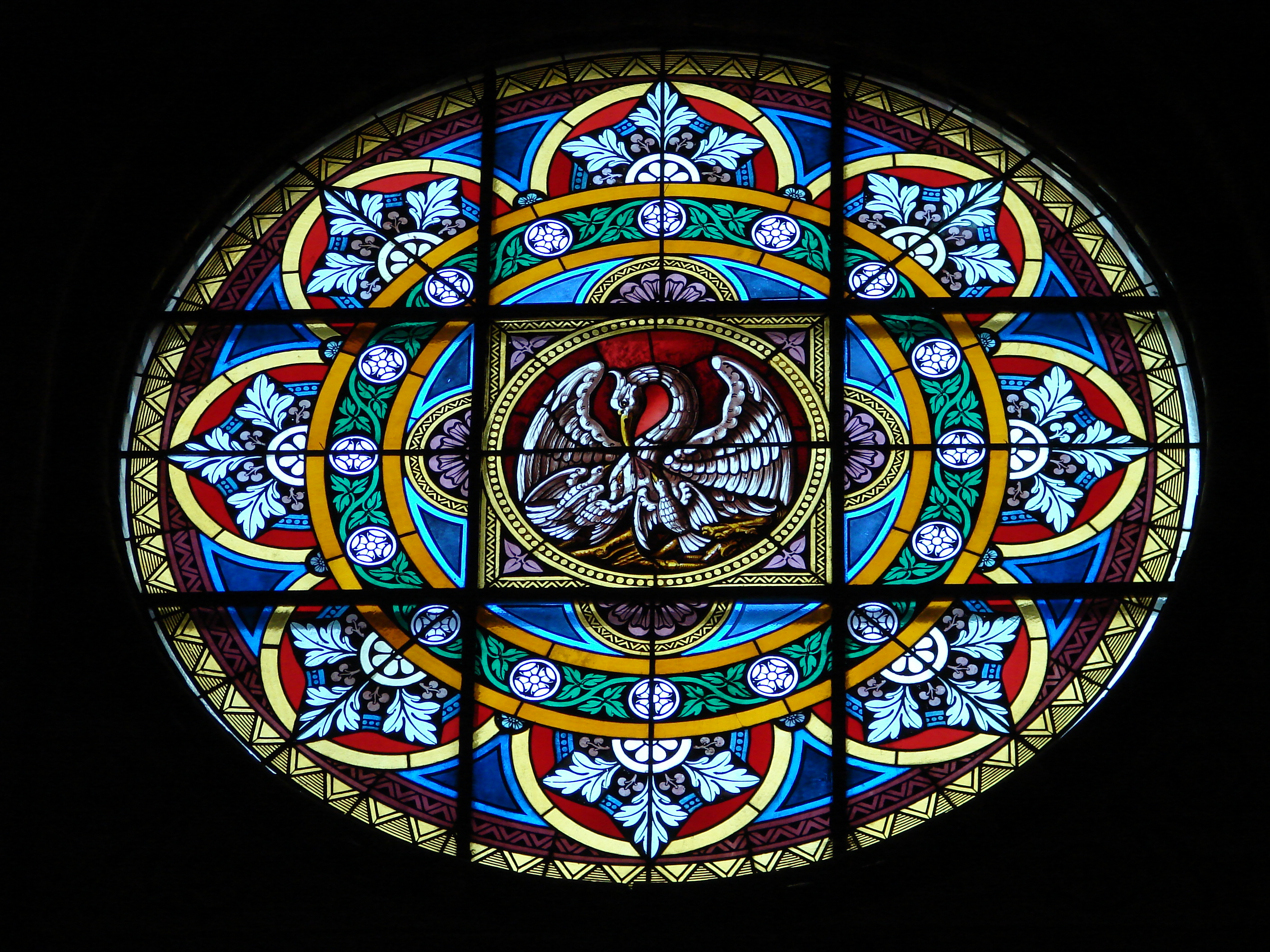
Stained glass window

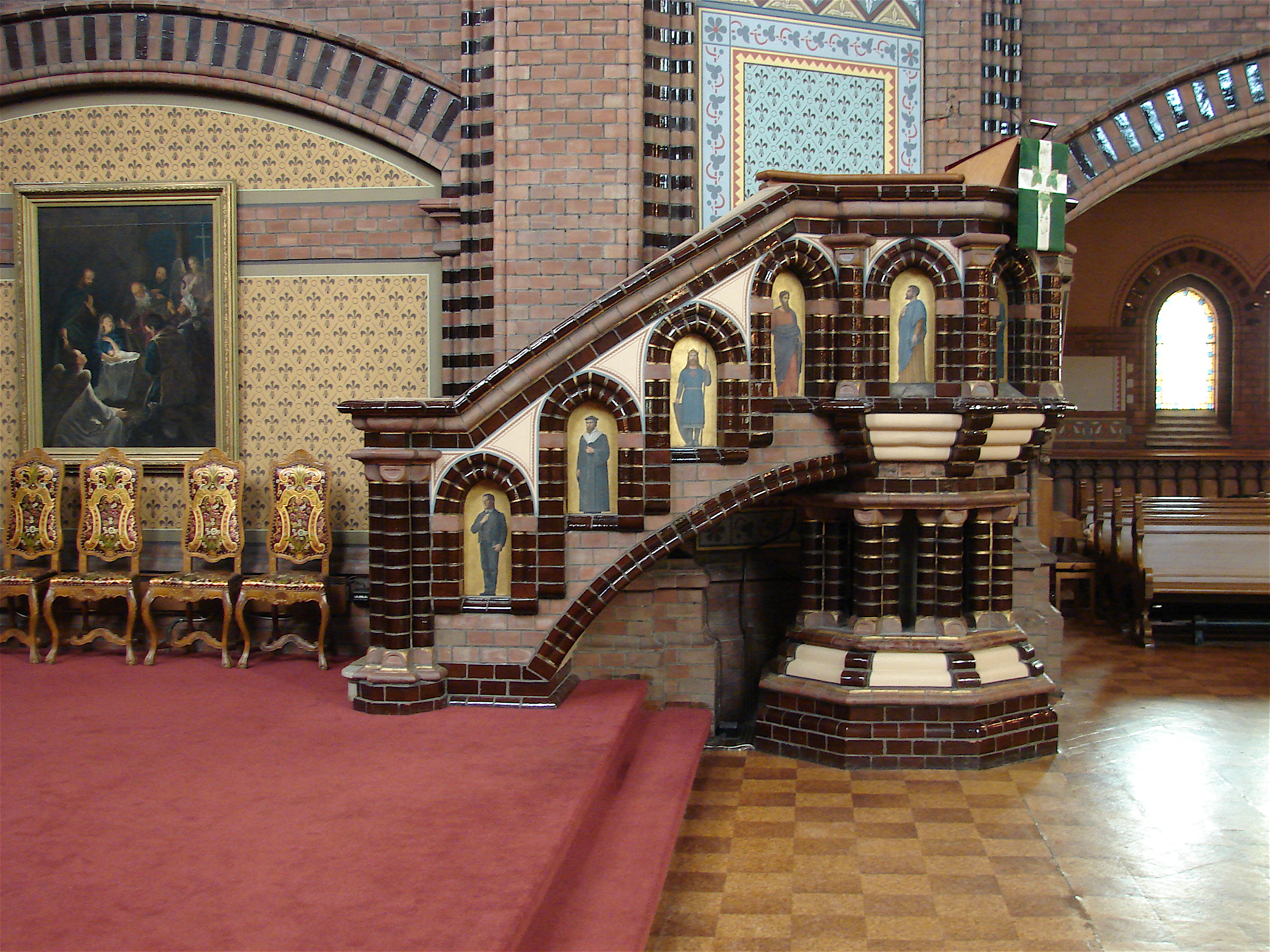
Church pulpit

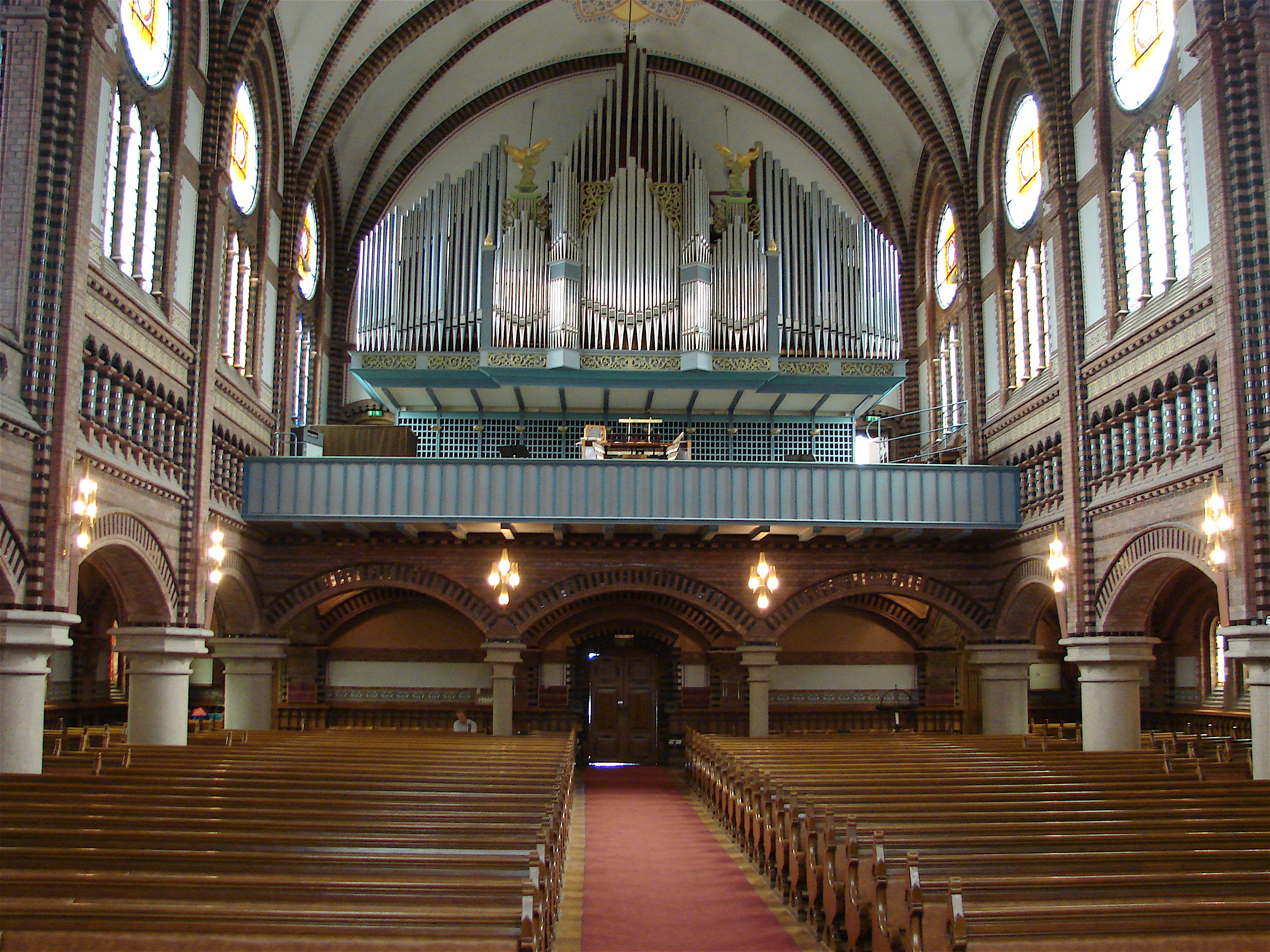
Church organ

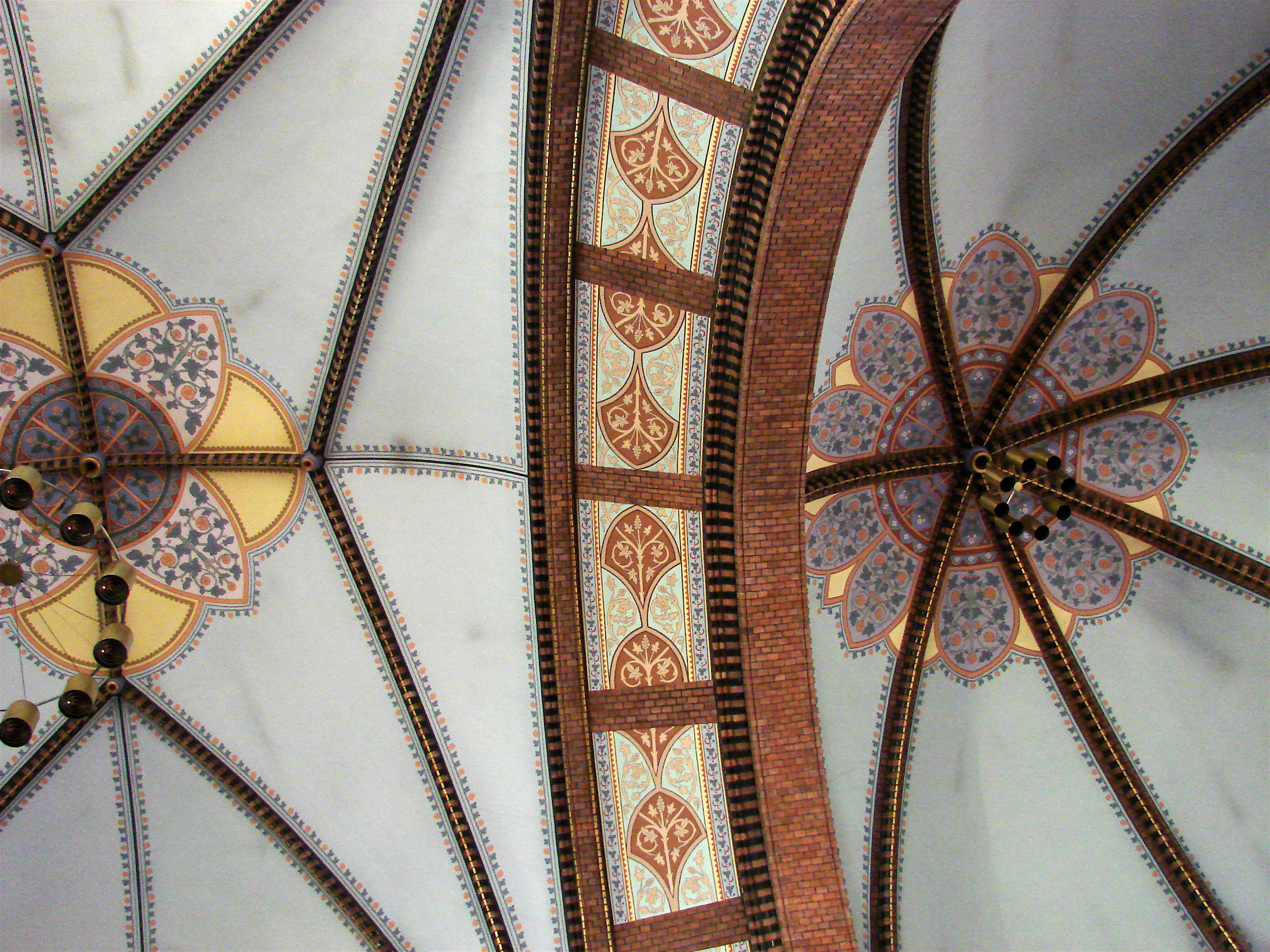
Church vault

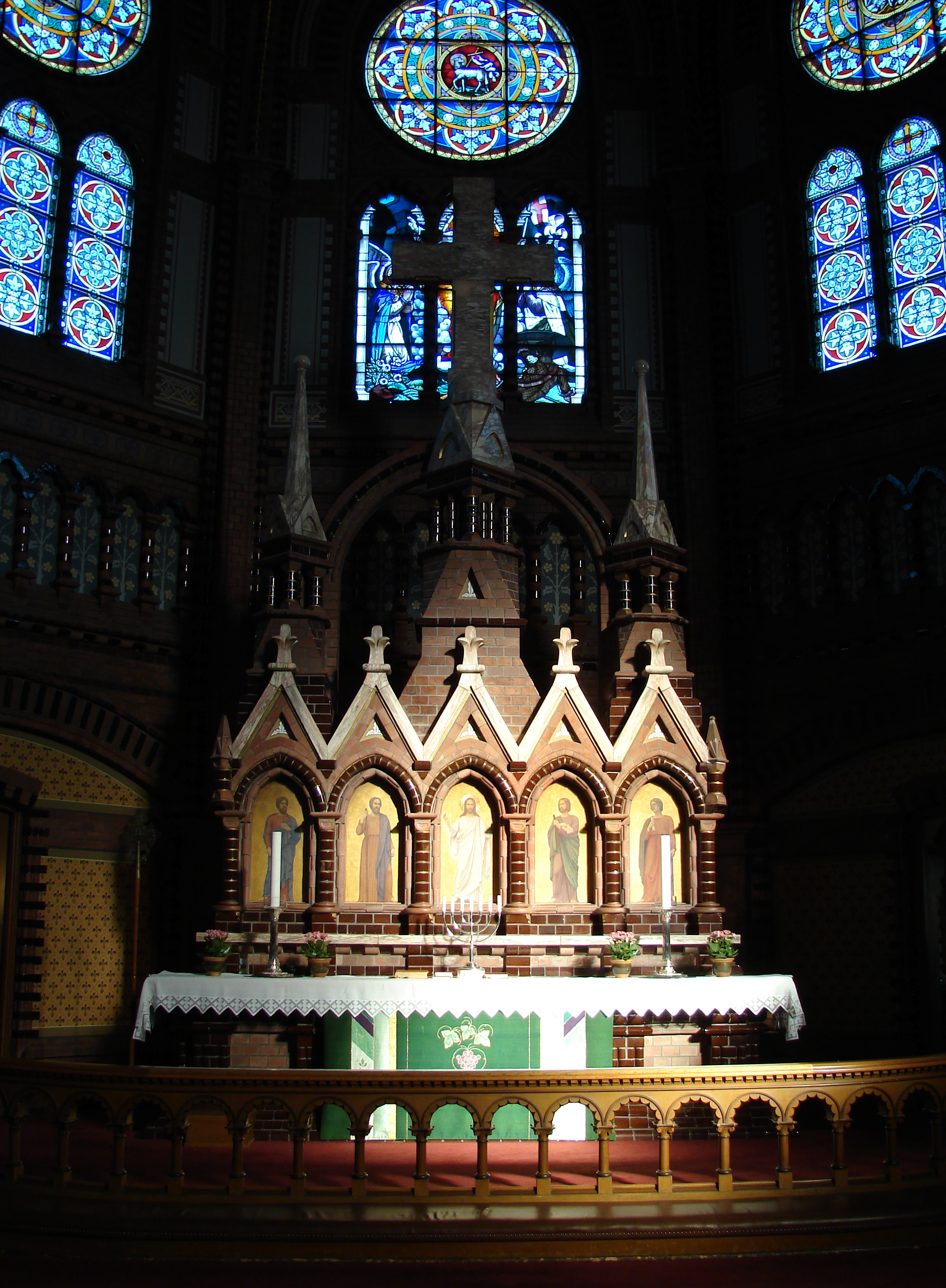
Skien Church's altar piece is shaped like a church facade with portals and towers and surrounded by stained glass windows
