= Witch trials in Norway =

The witch trials in Norway were the most intense among the Nordic countries. There seems to be around an estimated 277 to 350 executions between 1561 and 1760. Norway was in a union with Denmark during this period, and the witch trials were conducted by instructions from Copenhagen. The authorities and the clergy conducted the trials using demonology handbooks and used interrogation techniques and sometimes torture. After a guilty verdict, the condemned was forced to expose accomplices and commonly deaths occurred due to torture or prison. Witch trials were in decline by the 1670s as judicial and investigative methods were improved. A Norwegian law from 1687 maintained the death penalty for witchcraft, and the last person to be sentenced guilty of witchcraft in Norway was Birgitte Haldorsdatter in 1715. The Witchcraft Act was formally in place until 1842.

== History ==
=== Background ===
The Norwegian law (Landsloven) in the 13th-century for magic, if it resulted in someone's death or injury, was the death penalty. However, no execution for sorcery is known in Norway prior to the 16th century and only one witch trial, the Ragnhild Tregagås is known from 1325.

In 1584, King Frederick II of Denmark and Norway, on the recommendation of the Bishop of Stavanger Jørgen Eriksen, who was concerned about the frequent habit of the population's trust in the services of cunning men and cunning women, introduced the death penalty on the practicing of all sorcery in the Stavanger Bishopric; in 1593, this law was expanded to apply in all of Norway.

=== The witch trials ===
Between 1561 and 1760, about 860 people were put on trial for witchcraft in Norway, resulting in about 277 confirmed executions. However, these figures comes from the confirmed cases of which there are documentation and as such represent only a minority, as much documentation is known to be missing. The unconfirmed witch trials are estimated to be numbering at least 1,400, resulting in at least 350 executions. The most well documented areas are Finnmark, Rogaland and Hordaland from the 1590s onward.

An investigation could be instigated by the bailiff with reference to public safety after rumours of witchcraft had been heard from at least three different households. An accusation from a private citizen often came after a conflict, and was usually death or illness allegedly caused by witchcraft. The authorities and the clergy managed the witch trials, using instructions from international demonology handbooks. The Devil's Pacts and Witches' Sabbaths were the main definitions of a witch, but in general, the Norwegians did not include such things in their accusations, nor did the accused, who could admit to practicing folk magic voluntarily but did not associate this with Satan. The authorities interrogated the accused by interpreting their testimony so that it could fit in with the witch trial handbook's definition of what a witch was, and used torture to get a confession about a Devil's Pacts and a Witches' Sabbath. Torture prior to a confession was formally illegal in accordance with the Danish torture law of 1547, but was nevertheless commonly used. After a guilty verdict, the condemned was interrogated again, this time to expose accomplices. Death by torture or in prison was common. The method of execution was often burning alive at the stake.

The majority of those accused in Norway were either poor, vagabonds, beggars and other marginalized people; or cunning folk, normally people long rumoured to perform sorcery, and 80% were women, normally a married woman or a widow. The most profiled victims of the Norwegian witch hunt were Anne Pedersdotter of 1590 and Lisbeth Nypan of 1670.

=== Decline ===
After the 1670s, witch trials became more and more uncommon in Norway. The reason was that the high courts started to investigate and prevent the legal mistakes often made by the local courts handling the witch trials, such as the use of torture prior to a guilty verdict, the use of condemned criminals as witnesses and trial by ordeal, all of which were technically illegal and all of them commonly used in the witch trials. When witch trials were conducted in accordance with the law after the 1670s, they became smaller and fewer, and the method of execution was also to be decapitation rather than burning.

The Norwegian law of 1687 kept the death penalty for witchcraft, and the Witchcraft Act was in fact formally in place until 1842. The last confirmed execution for sorcery in Norway was the execution of Johanne Nilsdatter in 1695. Witch trials did occur in Norway during the 18th-century, but the authorities no longer issued the death penalty in such cases. Because of the lack in documentation, some of the witch trials in the 18th-century may theoretically have resulted in death sentences, such as the one against Brita Alvern in 1729. The last occasion when a person is confirmed to have been sentenced guilty of witchcraft in Norway was Birgitte Haldorsdatter in 1715: she was not executed, but sentenced to imprisonment.

== See also ==
- Witch trials in the early modern period
- Steilneset Memorial
