= 1709 in Norway =

- Centuries: 16th; 17th; 18th; 19th; 20th
- Decades: 1680s; 1690s; 1700s; 1710s; 1720s
- See also: 1709 in Denmark; List of years in Norway

Events in the year 1709 in Norway.

== Incumbents ==
- Monarch: Frederick IV.

== Events ==
- 22 April – Hugo Octavius Accoramboni was given the title Marquis of Lista.
- 22 October – The Treaty of Copenhagen renews the alliance between the Russian Empire and Denmark–Norway after it had been destroyed in 1700 with the Peace of Travendal. Denmark-Norway re-enters the Great Northern War as a result.

== Births ==
- (cirka) – Hans Holtermann, businessman and landowner (d. 1781).

== Deaths ==
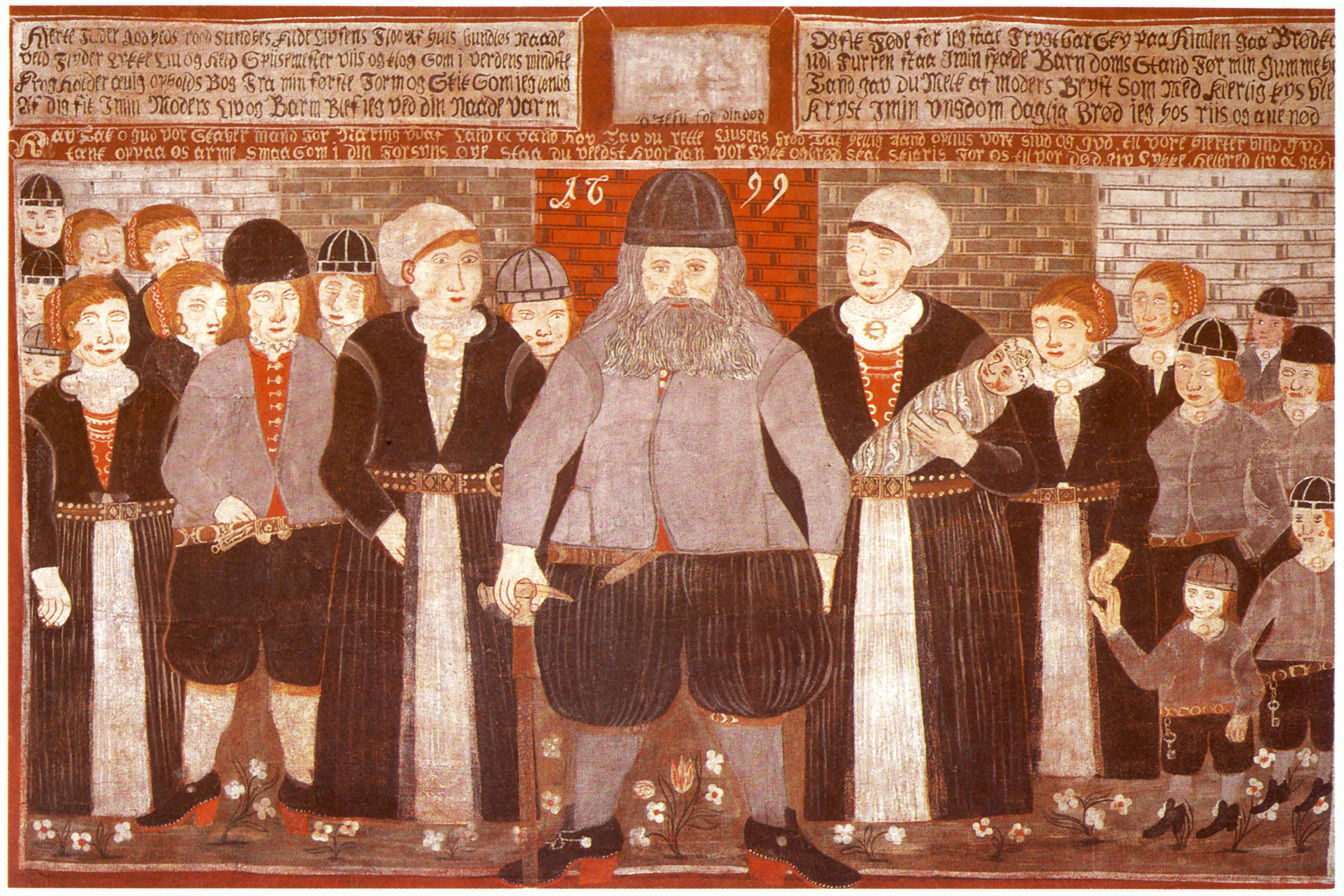
Bjørn Frøysåk with his family (including deceased members). Painting from 1699.

- Bjørn Frøysåk, farmer and merchant (born 1634).
