= 1695 in Norway =

- Centuries: 16th; 17th; 18th; 19th
- Decades: 1670s; 1680s; 1690s; 1700s; 1710s
- See also: 1695 in Denmark; List of years in Norway

Events in the year 1695 in Norway.

== Incumbents ==
- Monarch: Christian V.

== Events ==
- Johanne Nielsdatter, was executed for witchcraft. Her execution is the last confirmed execution for witchcraft in Norway.
- September – A crop failure due to cold weather leads to a great famine in Norway the next year.

== Deaths ==
- March – Edvard Edvardsen, educator and historian (born 1630).
- Johanne Nielsdatter, executed for witchcraft.
