= 1699 in Norway =

- Centuries: 17th; 18th; 19th
- Decades: 1670s; 1680s; 1690s; 1700s; 1710s
- See also: 1699 in Denmark; List of years in Norway

Events in the year 1699 in Norway.

== Incumbents ==
- Monarch: Christian V (until 25 August); then Frederick IV.

== Events ==
- 30 September - Frederik Gabel is appointed Vice Steward of Norway.
- Gustav Wedel was appointed commander-in-chief of the Norwegian army.
- The waterfall Steinsdalsfossen was formed when the river found a new race.

== Arts and literature ==
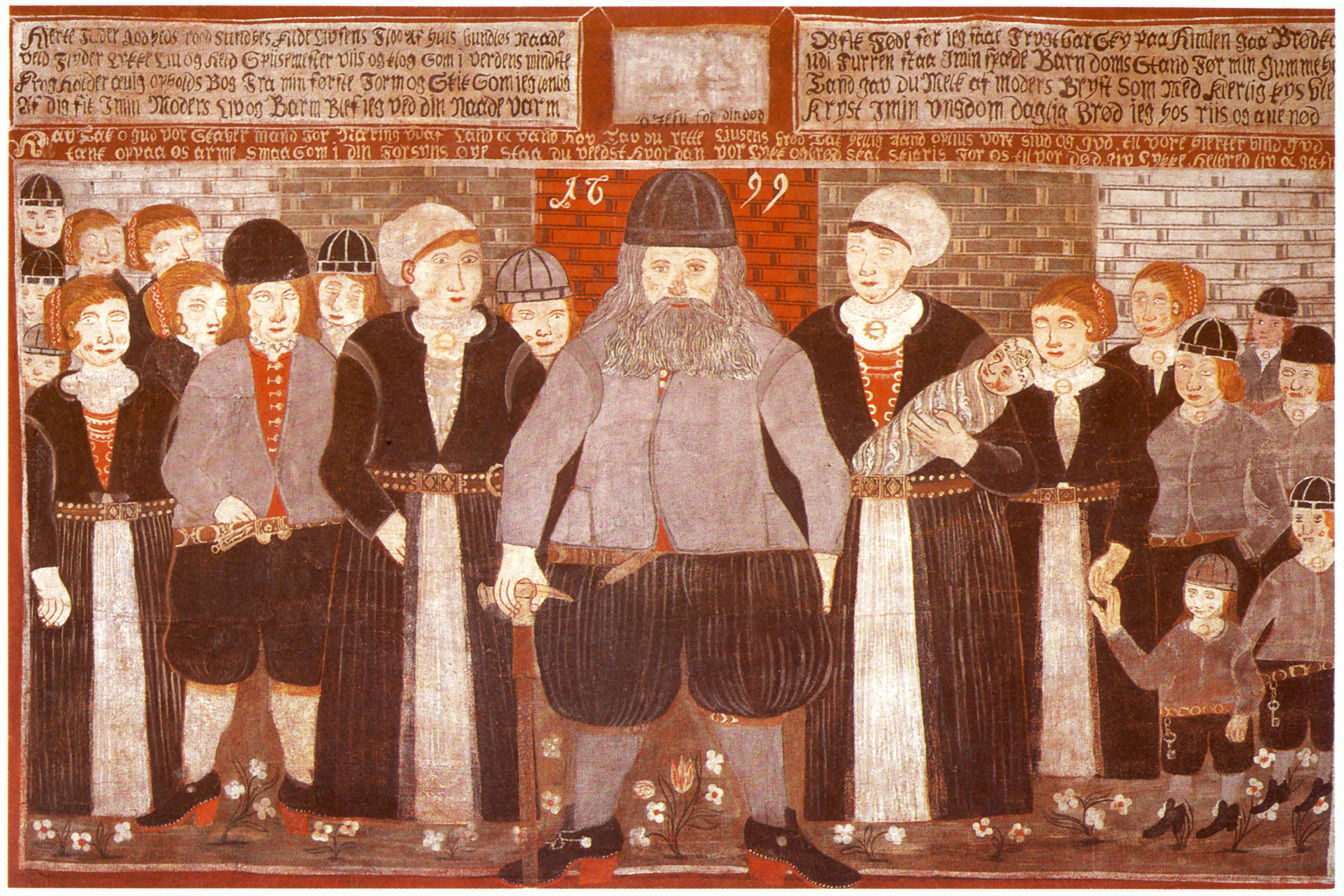
Bjørn Frøysåk with his family (including deceased members). Painting from 1699, unknown artist.

- Painting of the family of farmer Bjørn Frøysåk is made.

== Deaths ==
- 17 March – Peder Griffenfeld, statesman (b. 1635).
- 13 April – Hans Rosing, bishop (b.1625).
- 25 August – Christian V (b. 1646).

=== Full date of death missing ===
- Christian Jørgensen Kruse, government official (b. 1636)
