= 1633 in Norway =

- Centuries: 16th; 17th; 18th; 19th
- Decades: 1610s; 1620s; 1630s; 1640s; 1650s
- See also: 1633 in Denmark; List of years in Norway

Events in the year 1633 in Norway.

== Incumbents ==
- Monarch: Christian IV.

== Events ==
- Hans Hansen Bergen emigrated to New Netherland, one of the earliest Norwegian settlers of the Dutch colony.

== Births ==
- Didrik Muus, priest, painter, copper engraver (died 1706).
