= List of marquisates in Norway =

The list of marquisates in Norway contains two titles:

Marquis of Lista (created in 1709)

- Hugo Octavius Accoramboni

Marquis of Mandal (created in 1710)

- Francisco di Ratta
- Giuseppe di Ratta
- Luigi di Ratta
- Benedetto di Ratta
