= 1693 in Norway =

- Centuries: 17th; 18th; 19th
- Decades: 1670s; 1680s; 1690s; 1700s; 1710s
- See also: 1693 in Denmark; List of years in Norway

Events in the year 1693 in Norway.

== Incumbents ==
- Monarch: Christian V.

== Events ==
- Aron Åsulsen was convicted of sodomy, in Kragerø. The only known person convicted for homosexuality in Norwegian history before 1842. He was sentenced to whipping, branding, and banishment from Kragerø.

== Births ==
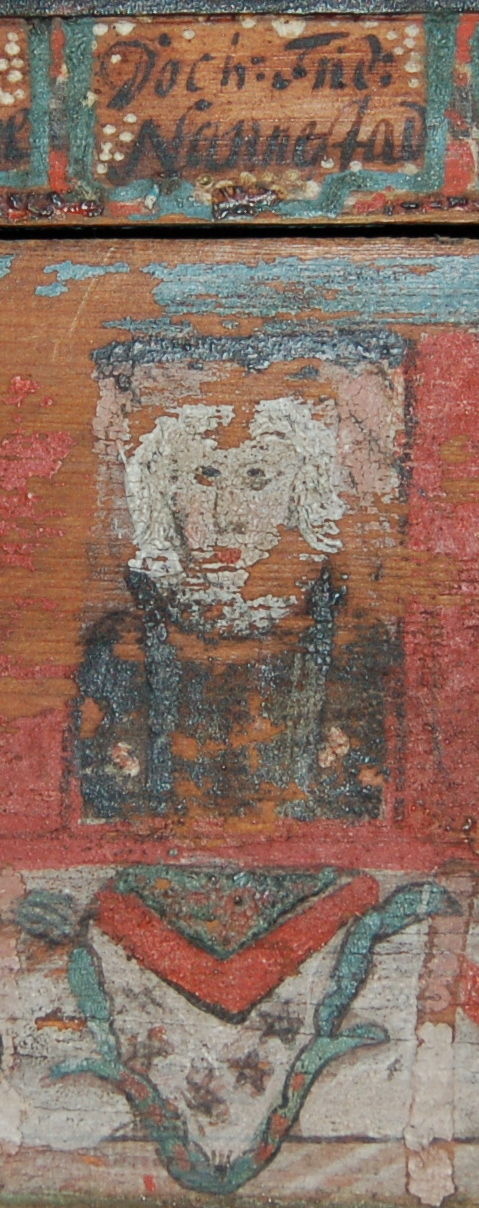
Painting of Frederik Nannestad

- 21 October – Frederik Nannestad, bishop (died 1774).

=== Full date unknown ===
- Hartvig Jentoft, merchant (died 1739).
- Christian Stub, jurist, law historian and civil servant (died 1736).
