= 1634 in Norway =

- Centuries: 16th; 17th; 18th; 19th
- Decades: 1610s; 1620s; 1630s; 1640s; 1650s
- See also: 1634 in Denmark; List of years in Norway

The following is a list of events from the year 1634 in Norway.

== Incumbents ==
- Monarch: Christian IV.

== Events ==
- 8 February - The Fogd (bailiff) is transferred to the direct service of the king, and not under the jurisdiction of the local Lensmann (fief-holder).

== Arts and literature ==
- Termini Juridici, the first Norwegian dictionary by Chancellor Jens Bjelke, is first published.

== Births ==
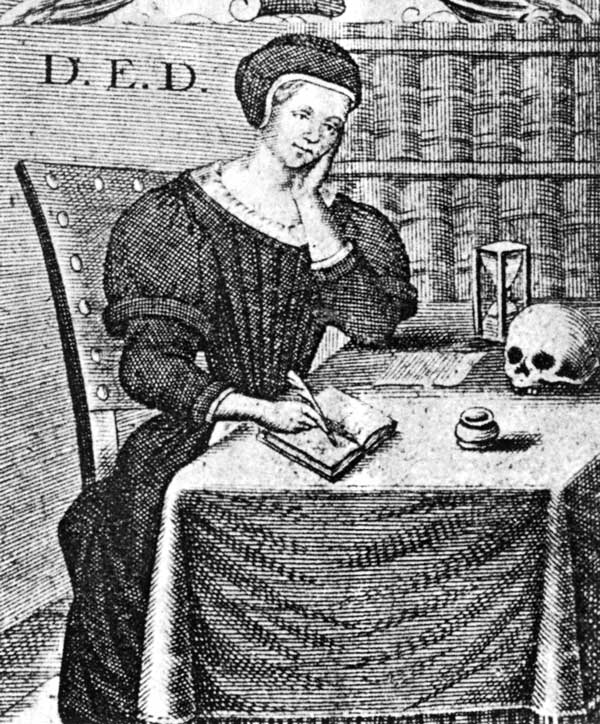
Dorothe Engelbretsdotter

- 16 January – Dorothe Engelbretsdotter, hymn and poem writer (died 1716).
- Bjørn Frøysåk, farmer and merchant (died 1709).

== Deaths ==
- 26 March – Jens Hermansson Juel, nobleman, Governor-general of Norway (born 1580).
