= Jürgen Christoph von Koppelow =

Danish-Norwegian officer

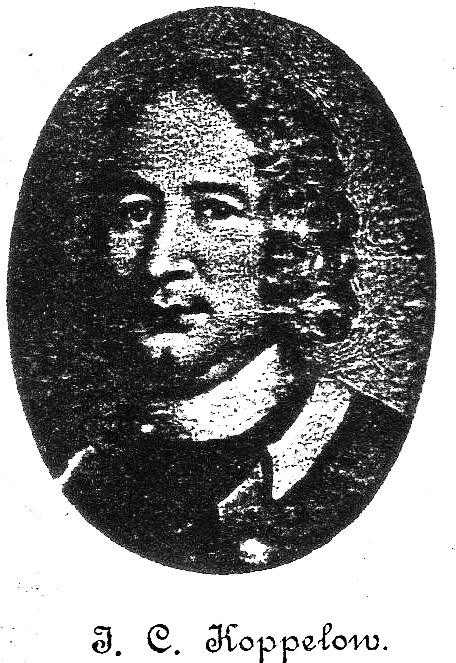
- Born: 3 January 1684; Rennebu, Søndre Trondhjem, Norway
- Died: 19 April 1770 (aged 86) Halden, Østfold, Norway
- Allegiance: Denmark-Norway
- Branch: Norwegian Army; Royal Danish Army
- Service years: 1703–1759
- Rank: Major General
- Commands: Vesterlen Company of the 2nd Søndenfjeldske Dragoon Regiment (1716–1718); Fröland Company of the 2nd Søndenfjeldske Dragoon Regiment (1718–1744); 3rd Søndenfjeldske Dragoon Regiment (1750–1759)
- Conflicts: War of the Spanish Succession; Rákóczi's War of Independence; Battle of Zsibó; Great Northern War; Battle of Gjellebekk (1716); Battle of Norderhov (1716)

Jürgen Christoph von Koppelow or Jørgen Christopher von Koppelau (variants: Koppelöu, Kaplan, Coplou, Coppelouwe, Kobbelow) (1684–1770) was a Norwegian nobleman and officer that fought in the Great Northern War on behalf of Denmark–Norway. Von Koppelow was the son of Curt Christoph von Koppelow, a German-Norwegian nobleman from the House of Koppelow in Mecklenburg-Schwerin. Von Koppelow led the Norwegian Army's 3rd Søndenfjeldske Dragoon Regiment upon its establishment in 1750.

== Biography ==
Von Koppelow entered military service in 1703 while his father Curt Christoph von Koppelow served as commandant of the fortress of Munkholmen. Like his father, Jürgen Christoph became a cavalarist. He began his career as a cornet in the Royal Danish Army, serving in the dragoon regiment of General Major Frederik Gersdorff in Rákóczi's War of Independence. Von Koppelow's regiment engaged in several campaigns in areas of the Habsburg Empire and took part in the decisive Battle of Zsibó against the Kuruc (Hungarian) army in Transylvania. After his deployment he returned to Norway to serve under Colonel Frederik Christopher de Cicignon between 1707 and 1709. Von Koppelow was deployed in Østfold in southeast Norway to serve in the Smaalandske Company as lieutenant in the 2nd Søndenfjeldske Dragoon Regiment by 1711. At age 32 Von Kopplow had been promoted to the position of captain in the Norwegian Army. The young officer gained several promotions in quick succession during his engagement in the Great Northern War.

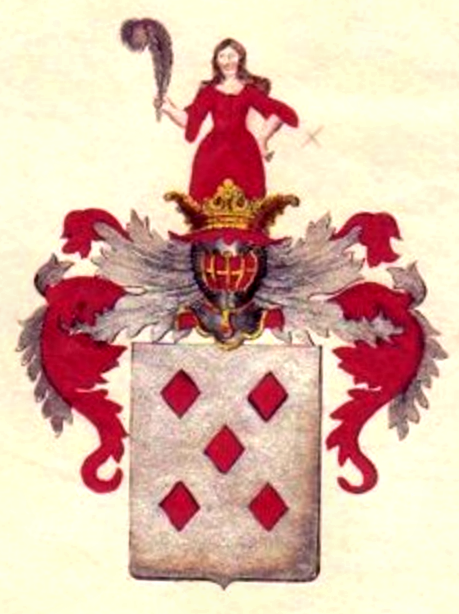
Coat of arms of the House of Koppelow

=== Service in the Great Northern War ===
Von Koppelow led his Vesterlen Company, around 100 men strong, in the crucial Battle of Gjellebekk (1716) on 23 March 1716 and Battle of Norderhov (1716) on 29 March 1716 during the Swedish invasion of Norway. On 8 March 1716 the Swedish Army led by King Charles XII of Sweden crossed the Swedish-Norwegian border, hoping that a strike against the country would compel Denmark-Norway, one of its main adversaries in the Great Northern War, to withdraw from Sweden’s prize territory Scania. To achieve this objective the main body of the Swedish force laid siege to Akershus fortress at Christiania (the contemporary name of Oslo). A force numbering an estimated 7,000 men took part in the invasion, and threatened Norway’s entire southeast region. However, prior to the siege much of the Dano-Norwegian force had retreated to Gjellebekk (variant Jellebeck) in Lier, a strategic position in the corridor between Christiania and Drammen. Intent on remaining on the offensive, the Swedish king directed a part of his force to push further into the countryside towards the Dano-Norwegian position.

=== Battle of Gjellebekk (1716) ===
600 dragoons under the command of Swedish colonel Dietrich Johan Löwenstierne were tasked with the objective of engaging the Norwegian Army head on. Yet the southeast region of Norway had experienced heavy snowfall in March, and the forested countryside presented a not insignificant hurdle for cavalry units that depended on mobility and speed. Despite the difficult terrain the Swedish force initially moved aggressively westwards, and managed to surprise a Dano-Norwegian position at Gjellum (variant Hellum). The forward position was quickly overwhelmed. However, three dragoon companies led by Captain Von Koppelow, Colonel Johan Wilhelm von Ötken and Lieutenant Peder Tønder Collin came to the aid of the isolated units, and drove back Löwenstiernes’s force. While both sides suffered casualties, the counter-attack and stiff resistance by Von Koppelow’s dragoons dissuaded the Swedish Army from proceeding further towards Gjellebekk.

=== Battle of Norderhov (1716) ===
In coordination with Löwenstierne’s frontal attack, the Swedish king had also instructed Axel Löwen to move with a force of 500 dragoons northwest to Ringerike and then, in an intended pincer movement with Löwenstierne’s dragoons, move south to ambush the Dano-Norwegian army on its rear and flank. Löwen’s ambush force had initially escaped the attention of the Dano-Norwegian command, permitting the Swedes to move unnoticed for nearly three days. However, by noon 28 March 1716 Lieutenant General Barthold Heinrich von Lützow had received intelligence about the large Swedish cavalry force. Lützow immediately dispatched a part of Colonel Johan Wilhelm von Ötken’s 2nd Søndenfjeldske Dragoon Regiment towards Ringerike to halt the Swedish advance. Captain Jürgen Christoph von Koppelow, Captain Knud Sehestad and Lieutenant Peder Tønder Collin were tasked with intercepting the Swedes as quickly as possible.

Not long after the Swedes had made Camp and lit their Bonfires, arrived our Avantgarde under Captain Sehestad, Koppelow and Collins' Command at 1/4 a Mile near (Norderhov) Manse.

— Lieutenant General Barthold Heinrich von Lützow's battle report (1716)

Von Koppelow and the dragoon force rode with haste to Tyrifjorden, and cut across the frozen fjordwater to arrive at Stein at midnight 29 March 1716. A reconnaissance search of the area revealed that the entire Swedish force had camped at Norderhov manse, a clerical estate located only a few kilometers to the north. The Dano-Norwegian officers held a brief council to decide whether to proceed, or to wait for the larger backup force riding under Colonel Ötken. It was decided that the element of surprise outweighed the numerical inferiority of the dragoons vis-a-vis the Swedish force. A few hours after midnight and under the cover of darkness, Von Koppelow and the dragoon force moved silently towards the manse grounds at Norderhov. The guard positions were neutralised, and the dragoons moved within a stone’s throw from Norderhov until the entirety of the 150 men strong dragoon body moved into full gallop onto the Swedish encampment.

At 3 in the night they arrived at Norderhov’s Manse in full Stride, on Horseback, and rode among the Houses with Guns and Sabres, ambushing the Enemy in his Sleep. Whereafter the Swedes were confused and scattered without the faintest Defense, and being shot, killed and cut down.

— An eyewitness account collected by priest Rosing (1732)

By the morning of 29 March Colonel Ötken and the main force of the dragoons had arrived at Norderhov. Commander Löwen had been taken prisoner together with a sizeable segment of the Swedish force, while the remaining troops had fled into the woods and surrounding countryside. Forced to contend with a string of losses, Sweden’s invasion initiative was seriously hampered.

=== Dragoon regiment command ===
Von Koppelow was described by a peer in Christiania in 1731 as a "vigilant and quick-minded officer, and of great talent." With the end of the Great Northern War Jürgen Christoph continued his deployment as a dragoon officer in southeast Norway. The "noble and generous Captain Jørgen Christopher von Koppelow" bought Spydeberg church in Østfold in 1723. Von Koppelow was given command of the dragoon Fröland Company, based in the southeast provinces Østfold and Akershus, and was promoted to the rank of major in April 1729 and then lieutenant colonel in April 1735. From 1744 Von Koppelow joined the 2nd Søndenfjeldske Dragoon Regiment headquarter staff of Major General Paul Beenfeldt, who was based in Christiania.

In 1750 Colonel Von Koppelow was given the virgin command of the newly established 3rd Søndenfjeldske Dragoon Regiment, and subsequently promoted to major general in the Norwegian army. Lieutenant Colonel Nicolay Hersleb and Major Frantz Christian Zepelin were appointed to serve on his staff. Jürgen Christoph was appointed on the board of the General Staff of the Norwegian army in 1755, led by Field Marshal Hans Jacob Arnoldt, the commanding general of the Norwegian forces in Denmark-Norway. Von Koppelow held this position until his retirement in 1759, aged 75.

== See also ==
- German nobility
- Norwegian nobility
- Danish nobility
