= 1710 in Norway =

- Centuries: 16th; 17th; 18th; 19th; 20th
- Decades: 1690s; 1700s; 1710s; 1720s; 1730s
- See also: 1710 in Denmark; List of years in Norway

Events in the year 1710 in Norway.

== Incumbents ==
- Monarch: Frederick IV.

== Events ==
- August 1 – Woldemar Løvendal was appointed Steward of Norway.
- October 4 – The Dannebroge explodes and sinks at the Battle of Køge Bay in Denmark, almost all of its crew of 600 were killed, one thirds of the victims were Norwegians.
- November 24 – Francisco di Ratta and his two nephews Giuseppe di Ratta and Luigi di Ratta is given the title Marquis of Mandal.

== Arts and literature ==
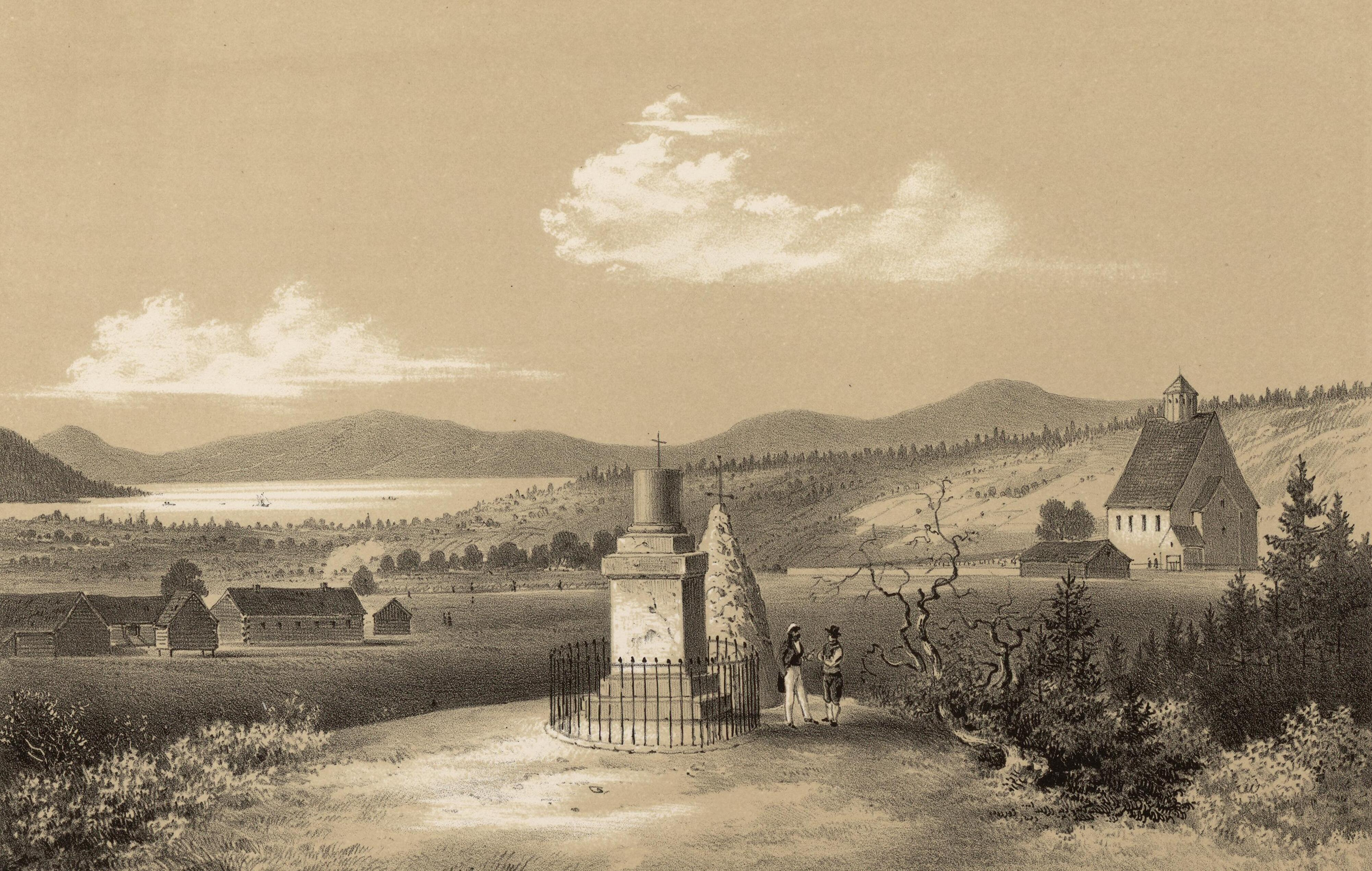
Drawing from 1848. Olavsstøtta from 1807 is on the left and Lemfortstøtta is on the right. In the background is Stiklestad Church from 1180.

- The Lemfortstøtta monument at Stiklestad, commemorating the Battle of Stiklestad, was erected.

== Births ==
=== Full date missing ===
- Niels Egede – merchant and missionary (died 1782)

== Deaths ==
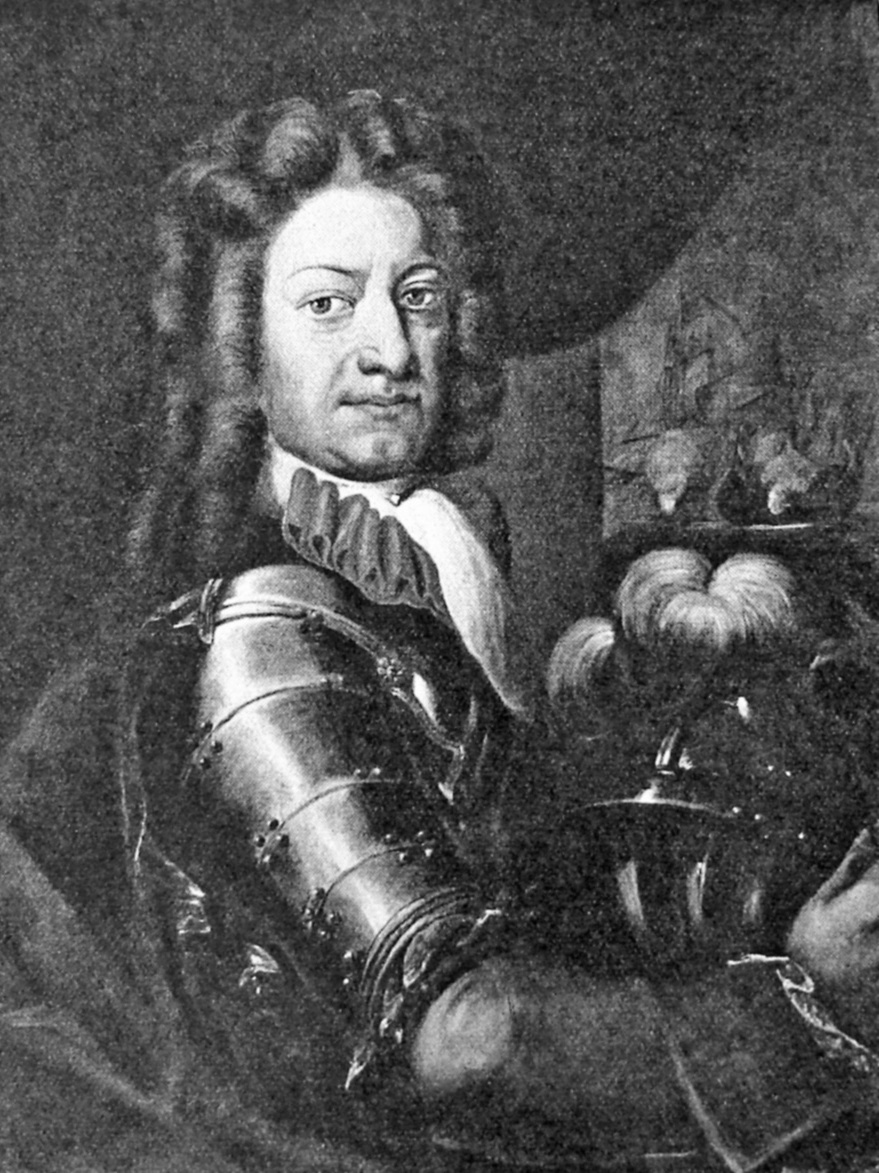
Iver Huitfeldt

- 20 February – Johan Vibe, military officer and engineer, Governor-General of Norway (b. 1637).
- 4 October – Iver Huitfeldt, naval officer (born 1665).
