= 1705 in Norway =

- Centuries: 16th; 17th; 18th; 19th; 20th
- Decades: 1680s; 1690s; 1700s; 1710s; 1720s
- See also: 1705 in Denmark; List of years in Norway

Events in the year 1705 in Norway.

== Incumbents ==
- Monarch: Frederick IV.

== Births ==
=== Full date unknown ===
- Jakob Klukstad, wood carver (died 1773).

== Deaths ==
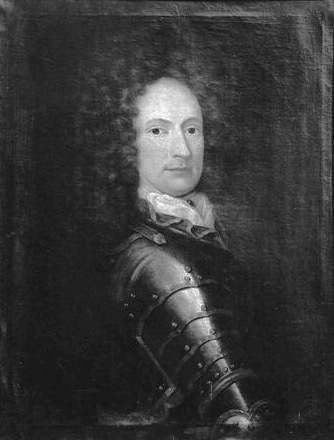
Curt Christoph von Koppelow

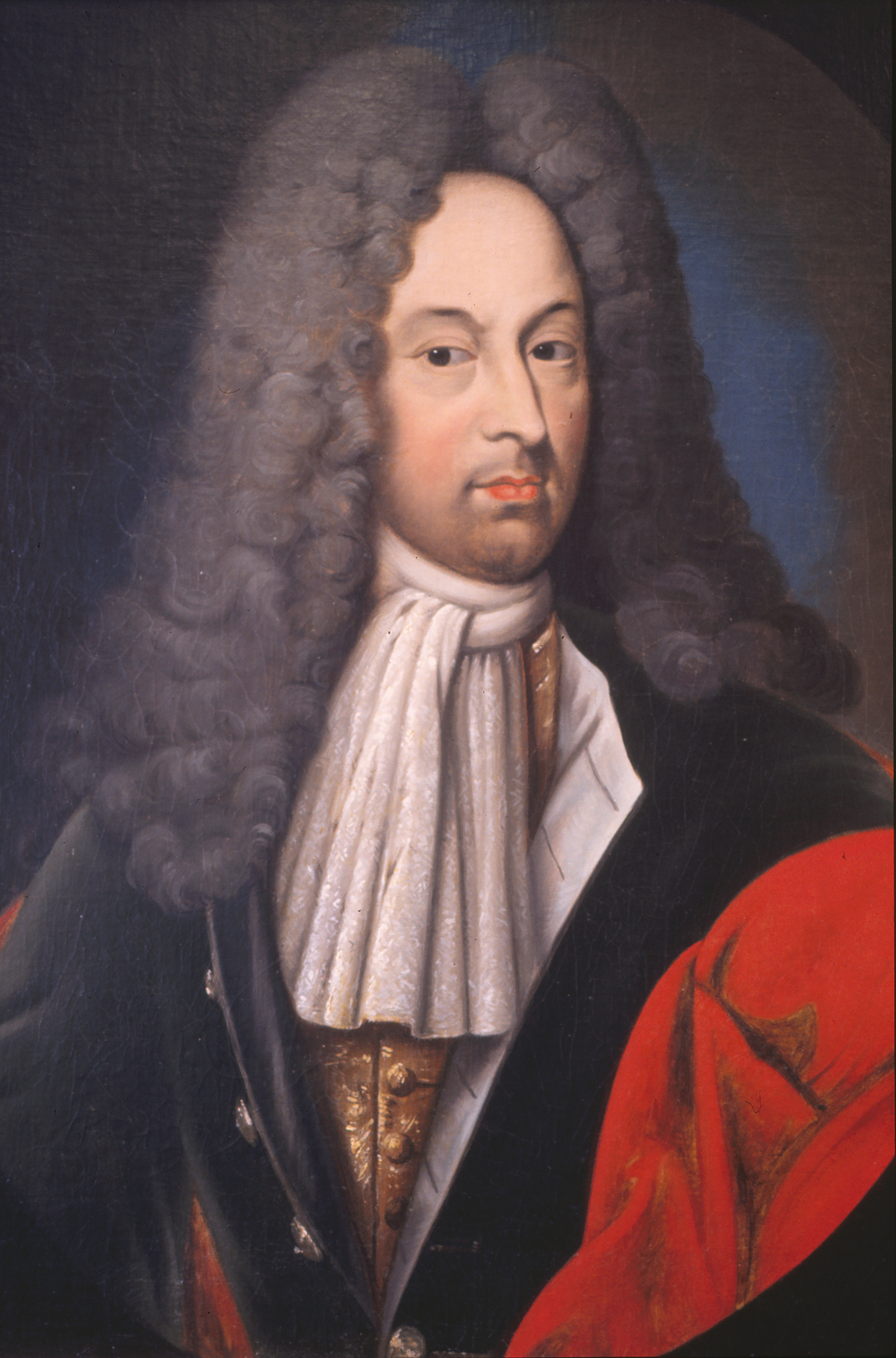
Albert Angell

- 13 March – Curt Christoph von Koppelow, nobleman and officer (born c. 1624).
- 28 August – Ludvig Stoud, bishop (b. 1649).
- 13 September – Albert Angell, civil servant, landowner and businessperson (born 1660).

=== Full date missing ===
- Mats de Tonsberg, civil servant and timber trader (born 1638).
