= 1706 in Norway =

- Centuries: 17th; 18th; 19th; 20th
- Decades: 1680s; 1690s; 1700s; 1710s; 1720s
- See also: 1706 in Denmark; List of years in Norway

Events in the year 1706 in Norway.

== Incumbents ==
- Monarch: Frederick IV.

== Arts and literature ==
- St George's Church in Bergen was built.

== Births ==
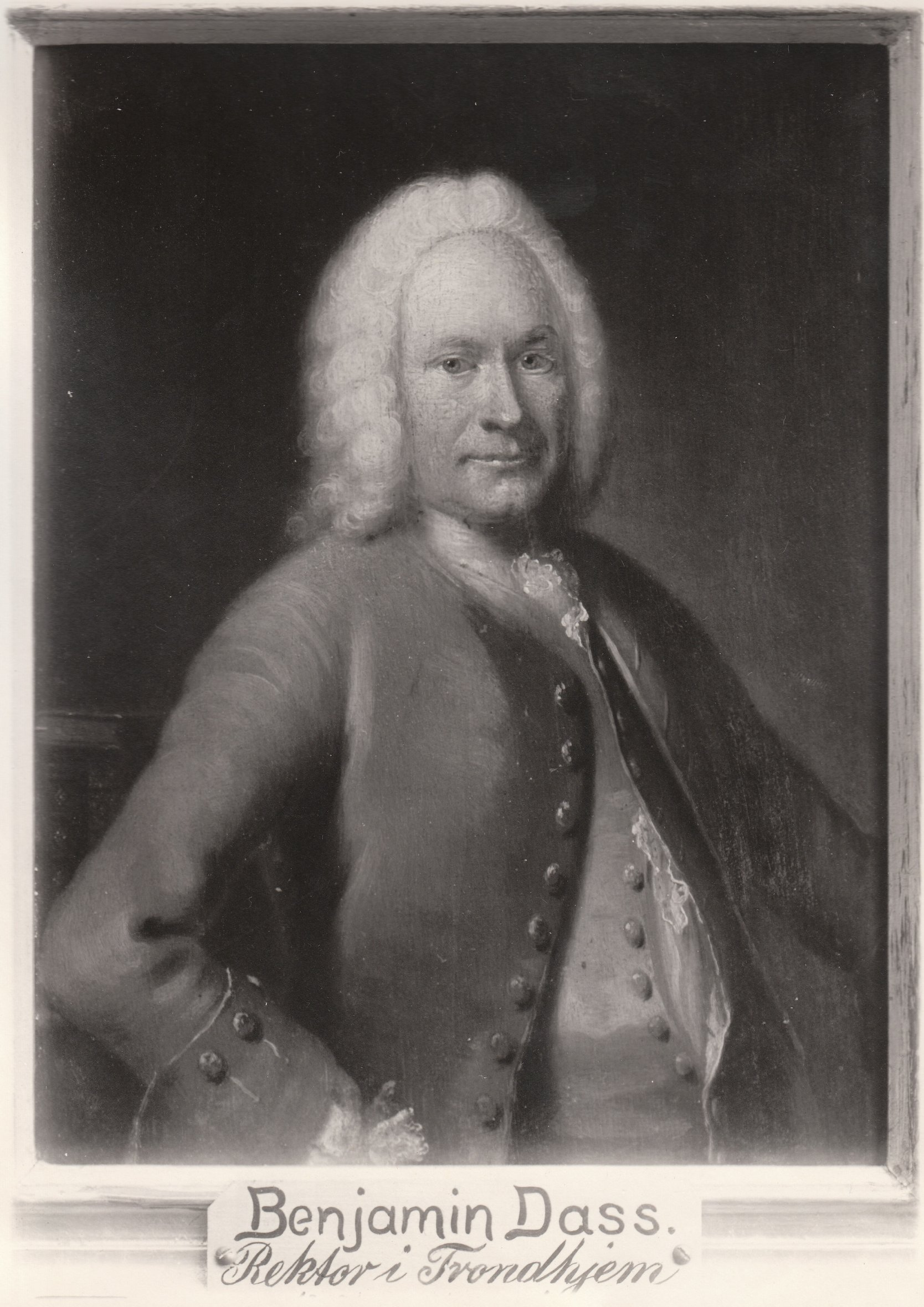
Benjamin Dass

- 15 August - Benjamin Dass, educator and book collector (died 1775).

== Deaths ==
- 7 February – Didrik Muus, priest, painter, copper engraver (born 1633).
