= Marquess =

Hereditary rank in various European peerages

A marquess (UK: /ˈmɑːrkwɪs/; French: marquis [maʁki]) (Note: Italian: marchese, Spanish: marqués, Portuguese: marquês.) is a nobleman of high hereditary rank in various European peerages and in those of some of their former colonies. The German-language equivalent is Markgraf (margrave) and the Italian-language equivalent Marchese. A woman with the rank of a marquess or the wife (or widow) of a marquess is a marchioness (/ˈmɑːrʃənɛs/) or marquise (French: [maʁkiz]). These titles are also used to translate equivalent Asian styles, as in Imperial China and Imperial Japan.

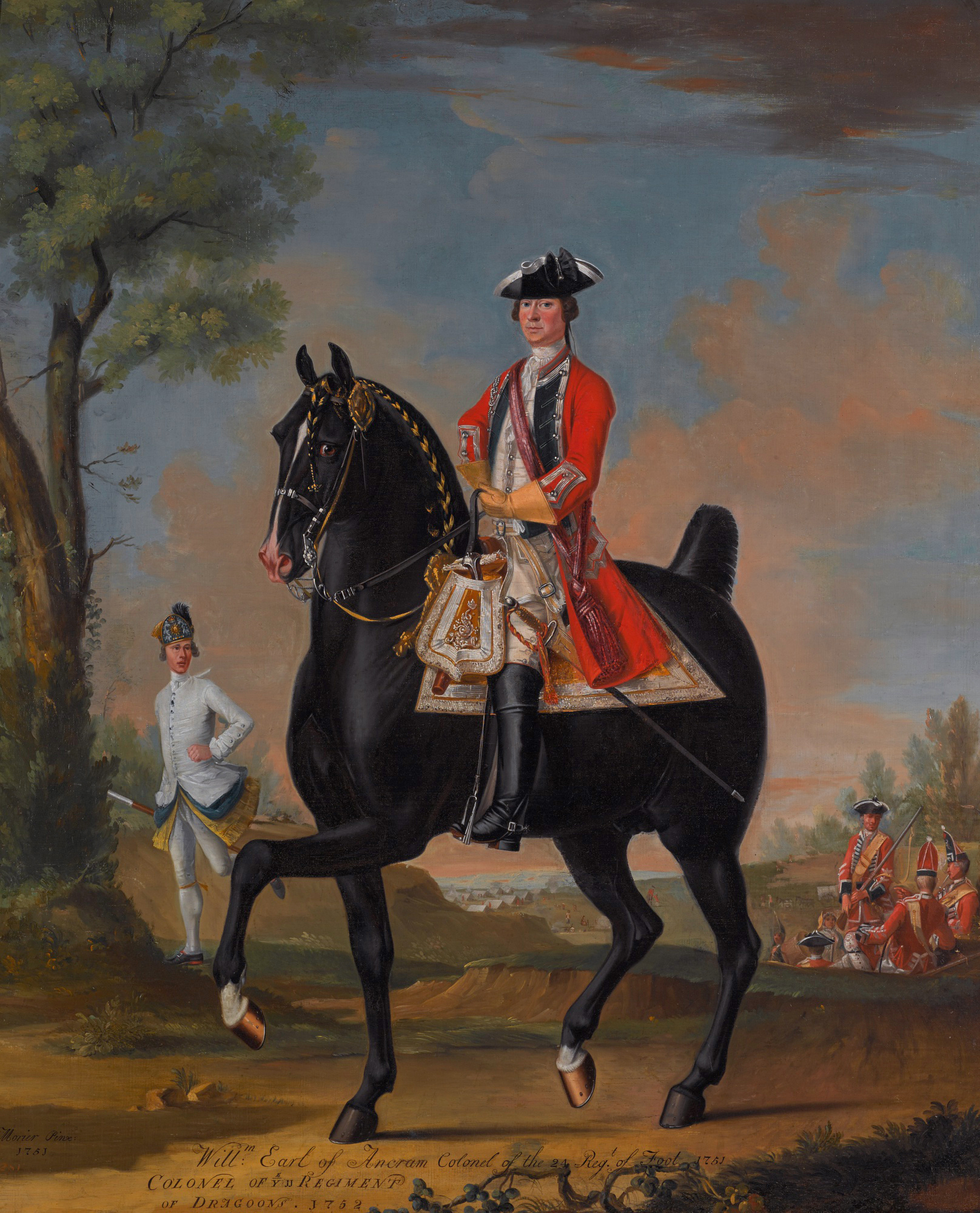
1751 portrait of the 4th Marquess of Lothian

== Etymology ==
The word marquess entered the English language from the Old French marchis ("ruler of a border area") in the late 13th or early 14th century. The French word was derived from marche ("frontier"), itself descended from the Middle Latin marca ("frontier"), from which the modern English word march also descends. The distinction between governors of frontier territories and interior territories was made as early as the founding of the Roman Empire when some provinces were set aside for administration by the senate and more unpacified or vulnerable provinces were administered by the emperor. The titles "duke" and "count" were similarly distinguished as ranks in the Byzantine Empire, with dux (literally, "leader") being used for a provincial military governor and the rank of comes (literally "companion", that is, of the Emperor) given to the leader of an active army along the frontier.

== Belgium ==
The title of marquess in Belgium predates the French Revolution and still exists today. See Belgian nobility § Marquesses in the Belgian nobility and List of noble families in Belgium § Marquesses.

== Spain ==
In Spain, the rank of Marquess/Marchioness (Marqués/Marquesa) still exists. One hundred and forty-two of them are Spanish grandees. Normally a marqués is addressed as "The Most Illustrious Lord" (Ilustrísimo Señor), or if he/she is a grandee as "The Most Excellent Lord" (Excelentísimo Señor). Examples include the Marquess of Carpio, Grandee of Spain.

== United Kingdom ==
In Great Britain, and historically in Ireland, a marquess ranks below a duke and above an earl. A woman with the rank of a marquess, or the wife of a marquess, is a marchioness /ˌmɑːrʃəˈnɛs/. The dignity, rank, or position of the title is a marquisate or marquessate.

The honorific prefix "The Most Honourable" precedes the name of a marquess or marchioness of the United Kingdom.

In Great Britain, and historically in Ireland, the spelling of this title is marquess. In Scotland, the French spelling marquis is sometimes used.

The coronet for a marquess in the British realms

The theoretical distinction between a marquess and other titles has, since the Middle Ages, faded into obscurity. In times past, the distinction between a count and a marquess was that the land of a marquess, called a march, was on the border of the country, while a count's land, called a county, often was not. As a result of this, a marquess was trusted to defend and fortify against potentially hostile neighbours and was thus more important and ranked higher than a count. The title is ranked below that of a duke, which was often largely restricted to the royal family.

The rank of marquess was a relatively late introduction to the British peerage: no marcher lords had the rank of marquess, though some were earls. On the evening of the Coronation of Queen Victoria in 1838, the Prime Minister Lord Melbourne explained to her why (from her journals):

I spoke to [Lord Melbourne] about the numbers of Peers present at the Coronation, & he said it was quite unprecedented. I observed that there were very few Viscounts, to which he replied "There are very few Viscounts," that they were an old sort of title & not really English; that they came from Vice-Comites; that Dukes & Barons were the only real English titles; – that Marquises were likewise not English, & that people were mere made Marquises, when it was not wished that they should be made Dukes.

== Analogous non-Western titles ==
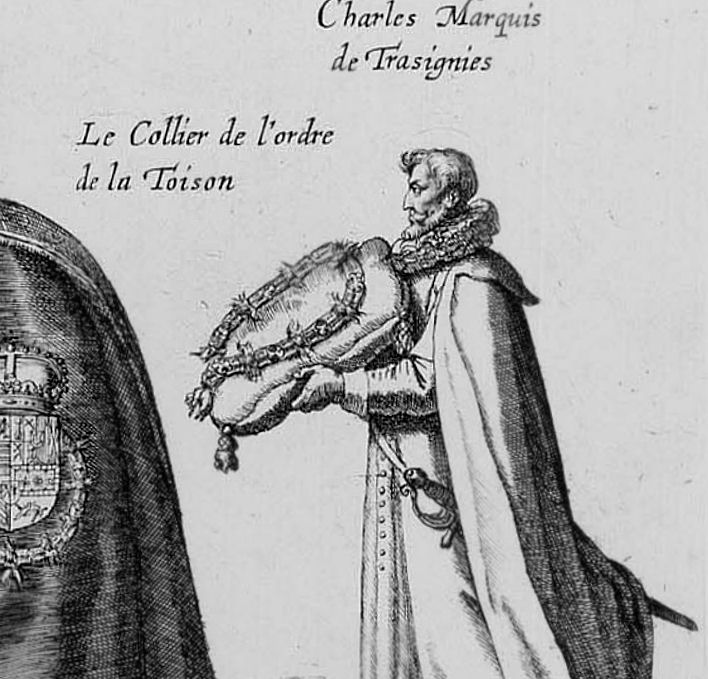
The Marquess of Trazegnies

Like other major Western noble titles, marquess (or marquis) is sometimes used to translate certain titles from non-Western languages with their own traditions, even though they are, as a rule, historically unrelated and thus hard to compare. However, they are considered "equivalent" in relative rank.

This is the case with:

- In ancient China, 侯 (hóu) a noble rank created by King Wu of Zhou for rulers of newly conquered regions, and is generally translated as marquess or marquis. In imperial China, 侯 (hóu) is generally, but not always, a middle-to-high ranking hereditary nobility title. Its exact rank varies greatly from dynasty to dynasty, and even within a dynasty. It is often created with different sub-ranks, with 列侯 (liè hóu, Ranged Marquis) generally the highest.
- In Meiji Japan, 侯爵 (kōshaku), a hereditary peerage (kazoku) rank, was introduced in 1884, granting a hereditary seat in the upper house of the imperial diet just as a British peerage did (until the House of Lords Act 1999), with the ranks usually rendered as baron, viscount, count, marquis and duke/prince.
- In Korea, the title of 현후 (縣侯; hyeonhu), the meaning of which is "marquess of district", existed for the hereditary nobility in the Goryeo dynasty. It was equivalent to the upper fifth rank of nine bureaucratic orders, and was in the third rank of six nobility orders. In the Joseon dynasty, there was no title equivalent to marquess.
- In Maritime Southeast Asia, temenggong (or tumenggung) is a title used by Islamic dynasties such as Mataram Sultanate and Johor to designate a noble ruled over a frontier area or district, or to a chief of public security. Tumenggung ranks below Bendahara or vizier.
- In Vietnam, hầu (侯) was a senior title of hereditary nobility, equivalent to marquis, for male members of the imperial clan, ranking under hoàng đế (皇帝; emperor), vương (王; king/prince), quốc công (國公; grand duke/duke of the nation), quận công (郡公; provincial duke) and công (公; duke, rather like a German Fürst), and above bá (伯; count), tử (子; viscount) and nam (男; baron).

== In fiction ==
Marquesses and marchionesses have occasionally appeared in works of fiction.

== See also ==
- Mark (county)
- Marquesses in the United Kingdom
- List of marquesses in the peerages of Britain and Ireland
- List of marquessates in the peerages of Britain and Ireland
- List of French marquesses
- List of marquesses in Italy
- List of marquises in Norway
- List of marquises in Portugal
- Exarch

== Sources ==
- The Chronological Peerage of England, hereditarytitles.com as of 2 March 2003; omits Normanby, misspells Hartington as Martington, places Marquess of Lorn and Kintyre in the peerage of England (Scotland is more probable).
- EtymologyOnLine
- Chisholm, Hugh, ed. (1911). "Buckingham and Normanby, John Sheffield, 1st Duke of" . Encyclopædia Britannica. Vol. 4 (11th ed.). Cambridge University Press. pp. 727–728. — "and in 1694 was made marquess of Normanby"
