= 1629 in Norway =

- Centuries: 16th; 17th; 18th; 19th
- Decades: 1600s; 1610s; 1620s; 1630s; 1640s
- See also: 1629 in Denmark; List of years in Norway

Events in the year 1629 in Norway.

== Incumbents ==
- Monarch: Christian IV.

== Events ==
- 22 May – Christian IV signs the Treaty of Lübeck, bringing an end to Denmark-Norway's intervention in the Thirty Years' War.
- Christoffer Urne became Steward of Norway, serving until 1642.

== Births ==
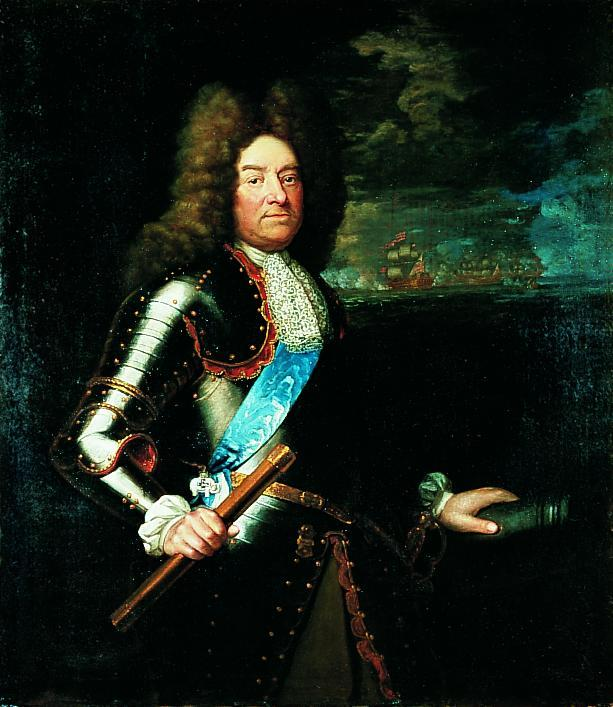
Niels Juel, painted by Jacob Coning.

- 16 February – Gert Miltzow, priest and historical writer (died in 1688).
- 26 February – Iver Leganger, priest and writer (died 1702).
- 8 May – Niels Juel, admiral (died 1697).
