= 1702 in Norway =

- Centuries: 17th; 18th; 19th; 20th
- Decades: 1680s; 1690s; 1700s; 1710s; 1720s
- See also: 1702 in Denmark; List of years in Norway

Events in the year 1703 in Norway.

== Incumbents ==
- Monarch: Frederick IV.

== Events ==
- May 19 - The largest city fire in Bergen's history. 7/8 of the city burns down.

== Births ==
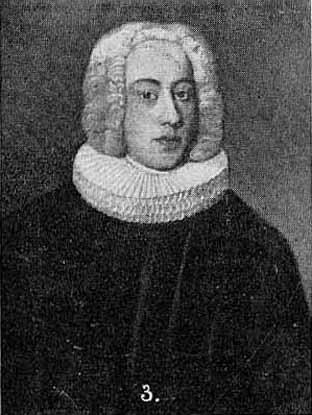
Rasmus Paludan

- Rasmus Paludan, bishop (d. 1759).

== Deaths ==
- Iver Leganger, priest and writer (born 1629).
