= 1630 in Norway =

- Centuries: 16th; 17th; 18th; 19th
- Decades: 1610s; 1620s; 1630s; 1640s; 1650s
- See also: 1630 in Denmark; List of years in Norway

Events in the year 1630 in Norway:

== Incumbents ==
- Monarch: Christian IV

== Events ==
- 27 March – The first regulation regarding the Dannebrog Splitflag in which King Christian IV ordered that Norwegian Defensionskibe (armed merchant ships) may only use the Splitflag if they are in Danish-Norwegian war service.
- Risør obtains the status of ladested (special trading port), subordinate to the nearby town of Skien.
- The Kvikne Copper Works, starts to operate, it is operated from 1630 to 1912.

== Births ==
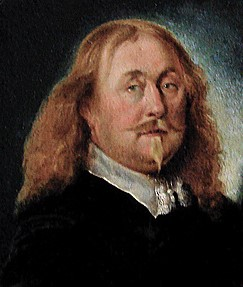
Lambert van Haven

- 16 April – Lambert van Haven, architect (died 1695)
- 16 November – Edvard Edvardsen, educator and historian (died 1695).

=== Exact date missing ===
c.1630 – Karen Mowat, heiress and landowner (d. 1675).
