= Curt Christoph von Koppelow =

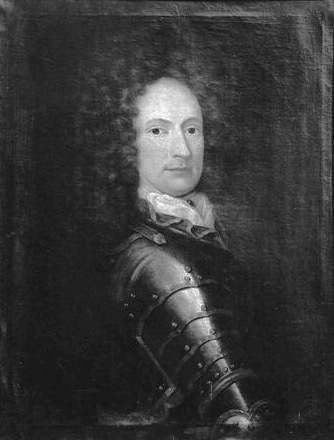
- Born: c. 1624; Suckow, Mecklenburg-Schwerin, Germany
- Died: 13 March 1705 Støren, Sør-Trøndelag, Norway
- Allegiance: Denmark-Norway
- Branch: Royal Danish Army; Norwegian Army
- Service years: 1658–1704
- Rank: Major
- Commands: Coastal fortresses: Munkholmen (1700–1704)
- Conflicts: Dano-Swedish War (1658–1660); Scanian War; Battle of Nyborg; Battle of Uddevalla; Battle of Marstrand

Curt Christoph von Koppelow or Cort Christopher von Caplau (variants: Koppelöu, Kaplan, Coplou, Coppelouwe) (1624–1705) was a German-Norwegian nobleman and officer in the Dano-Norwegian army. Von Koppelow was the commander of Munkholmen fortress in Trondheim, Norway, between 1700 and 1704. He was the father to Norwegian General Major Jürgen Christoph von Koppelow

As a young German nobleman from the House of Koppelow in Mecklenburg-Schwerin, Curt Christoph was invited in 1658 to serve under Danish field marshal Hans Schack. He participated in the Battle of Nyborg, which concluded the Dano-Swedish War (1658–1660) with a decisive victory for Denmark-Norway and its continental allies.

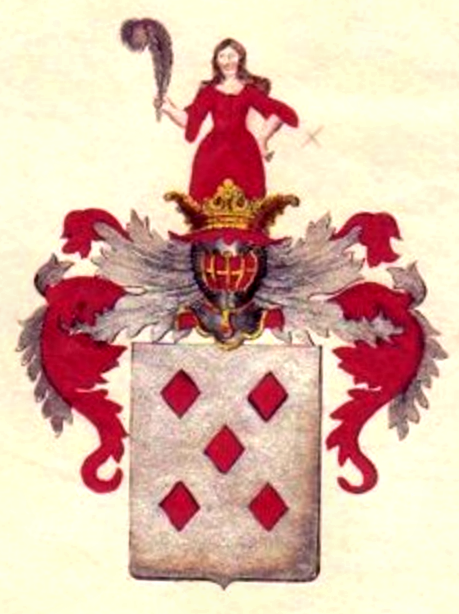
Coat of arms of the House of Koppelow

In 1662 Curt Christoph served in the Nordenfjeldske cavalry regiment as a cornet (second lieutenant), and then later served in Brockenhuus' cavalry until 1 September 1675. He was promoted to the position of lieutenant in Recke's cavalry squadron in April 1676 while fighting in the Scanian War. In June 1676 von Koppelow, riding with Bülow's cavalry squadron, crossed into Bohuslän, Sweden, as part of Ulrik Frederik Gyldenløve's Denmark–Norway invasion force. Von Koppelow's cavalry squadron participated in the defeat of the Swedish Army at the Battle of Uddevalla and at the Battle of Marstrand.

Subsequent to the Scanian War von Koppelow was promoted to major, commanding the Gauldal dragoon regiment of the Dano-Norwegian army from 1689 until 1699.

== See also ==
- German nobility
- Norwegian nobility
- Danish nobility
