= 1697 in Norway =

- Centuries: 16th; 17th; 18th; 19th
- Decades: 1670s; 1680s; 1690s; 1700s; 1710s
- See also: 1697 in Denmark; List of years in Norway

Events in the year 1697 in Norway.

== Incumbents ==
- Monarch: Christian V.

== Events ==
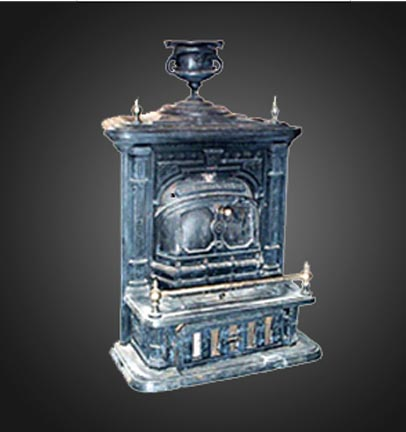
Stove from Eidsfos Verk

- Christian Gyldenløve was appointed commander-in-chief of the Norwegian army.
- Eidsfos Verk is established.
- October 16 – The Norwegian Code, promulgated by King Christian V of Denmark-Norway in 1687, is amended to provide for torture of condemned criminals in certain capital offenses in Norway, with permission for burning with hot irons, or cutting off the prisoner's right hand while the prisoner is being transported for decapitation.

== Arts and literature ==
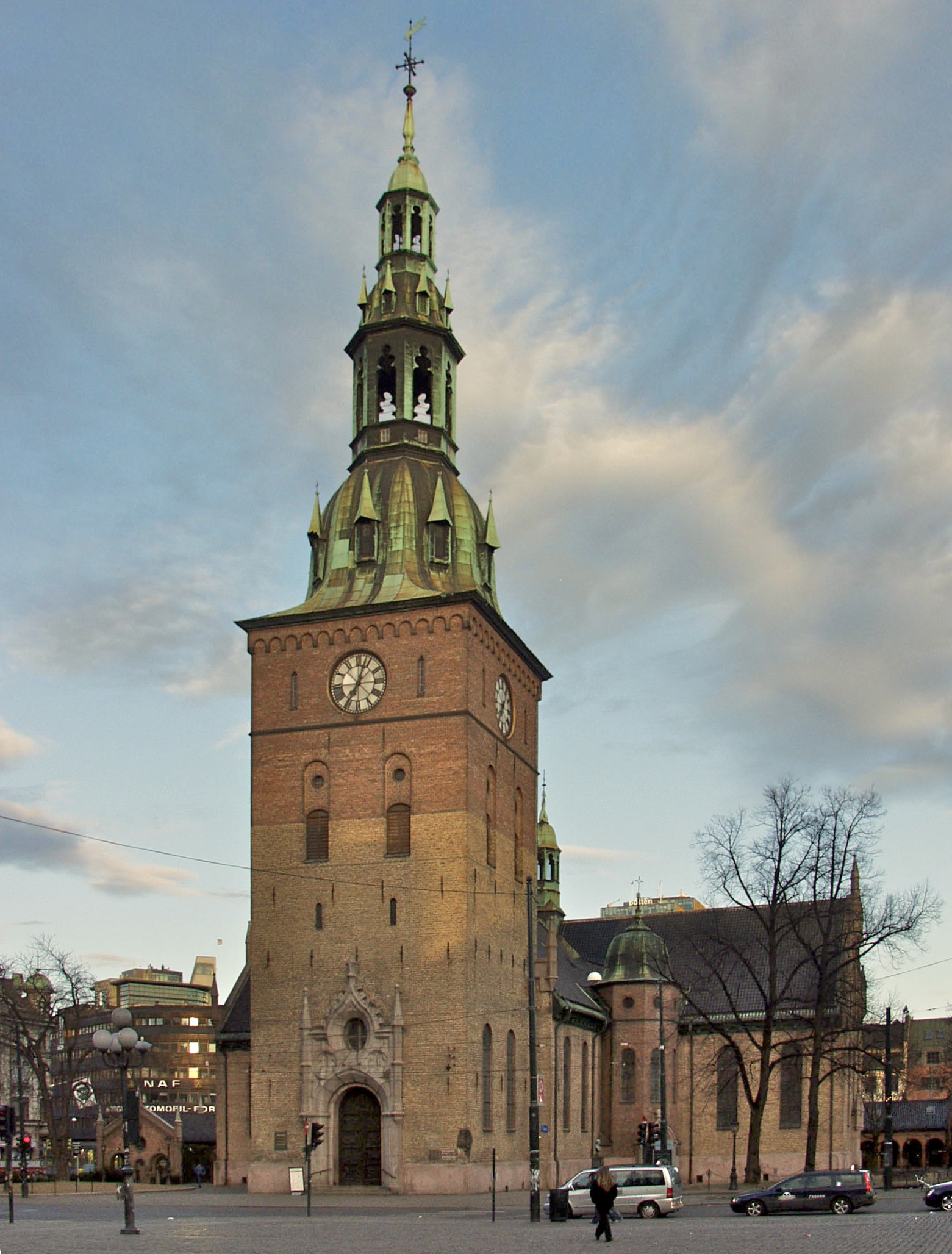
Oslo Cathedral

- The construction of Oslo Cathedral was finished.

== Births ==
- 12 January – Knud Leem, linguist (d.1774).

== Deaths ==
- 30 July – Lorentz Mortensen Angell, merchant and landowner (born 1626).
