= 1696 in Norway =

- Centuries: 16th; 17th; 18th; 19th
- Decades: 1670s; 1680s; 1690s; 1700s; 1710s
- See also: 1696 in Denmark; List of years in Norway

Events in the year 1696 in Norway.

== Incumbents ==
- Monarch: Christian V.

== Events ==
- Bentse Brug is established, the first paper mill in Norway.
- The first Store Færder Lighthouse is established (from the start the light was simply an iron pot placed on the ground).
- The Great Famine of 1696 hit major parts of Norway in the winter and spring.

== Arts and literature ==
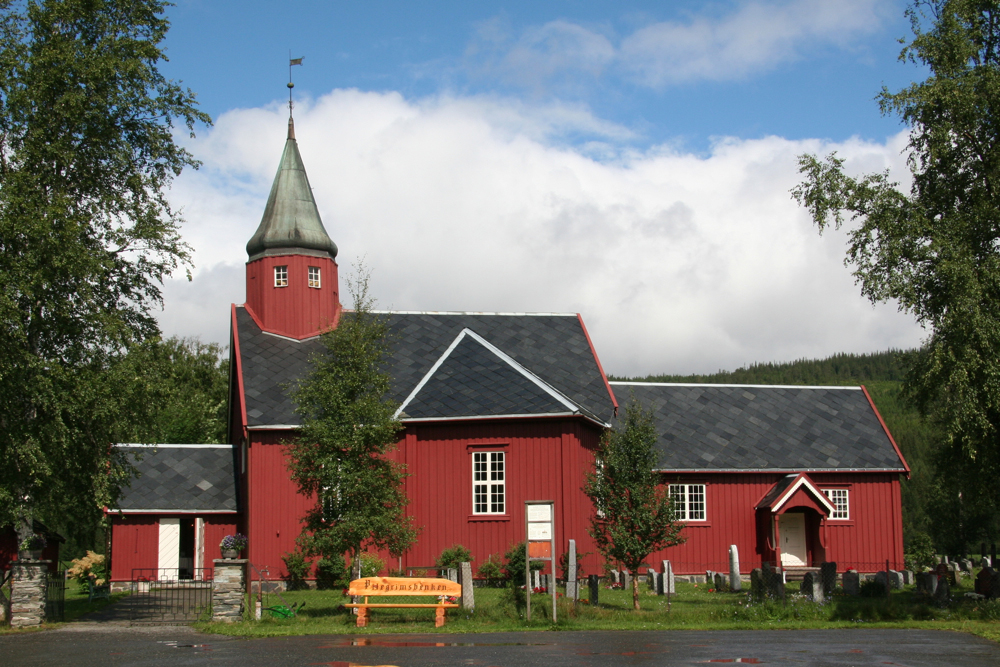
Tydal Church

- Tydal Church was built.

== Deaths ==
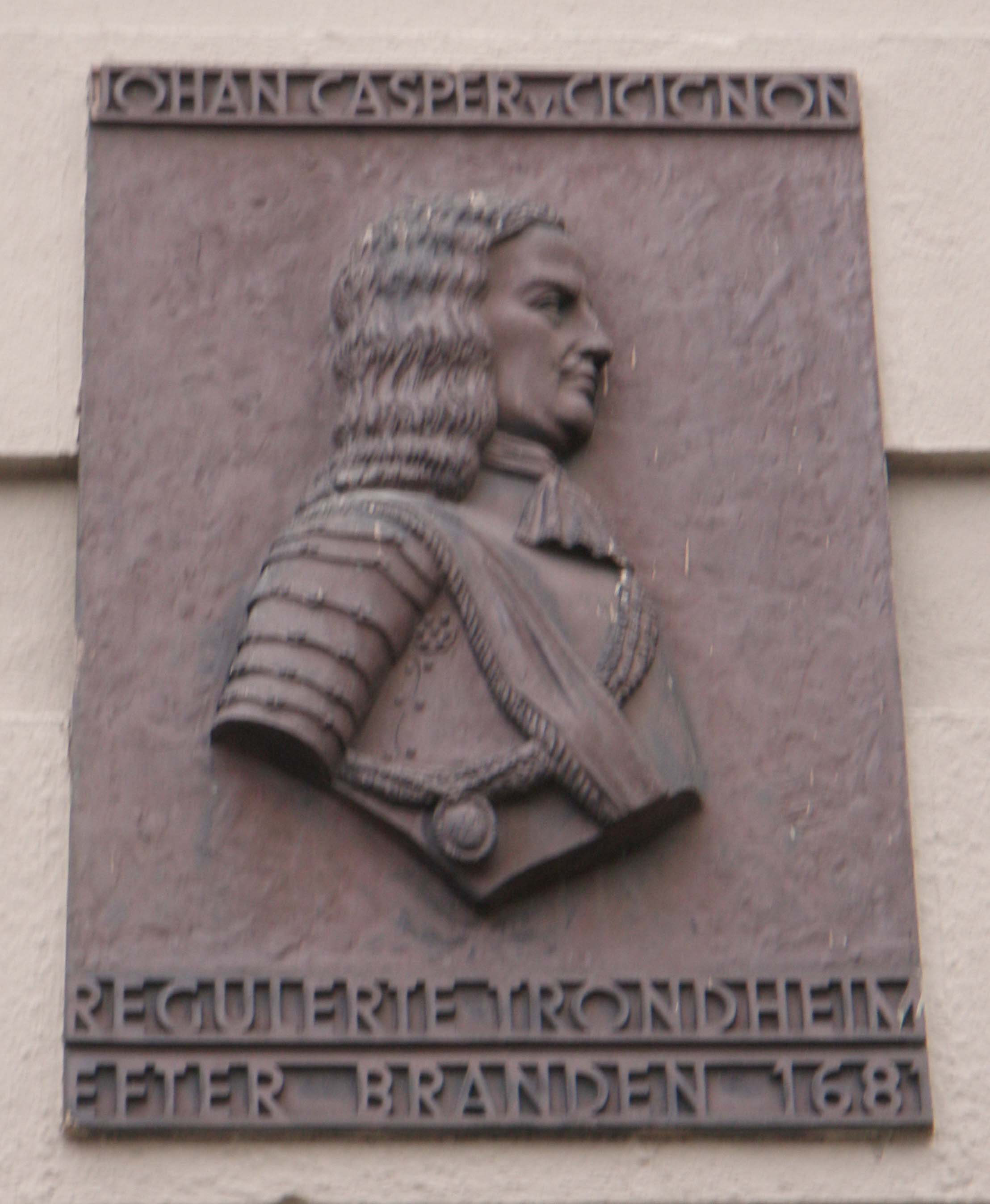
Johan Caspar von Cicignon

- 12 December – Johan Caspar von Cicignon, military officer (born c.1625).
