= 1707 in Norway =

- Centuries: 16th; 17th; 18th; 19th; 20th
- Decades: 1680s; 1690s; 1700s; 1710s; 1720s
- See also: 1707 in Denmark; List of years in Norway

Events in the year 1707 in Norway.

== Incumbents ==
- Monarch: Frederick IV.

== Arts and literature ==
- The Velthen Company becomes the perhaps first professional theater company to perform in Norway.

== Deaths ==
- Petter Dass, priest and poet and hymn writer (born 1647).
