= 1704 in Norway =

- Centuries: 16th; 17th; 18th; 19th; 20th
- Decades: 1680s; 1690s; 1700s; 1710s; 1720s
- See also: 1704 in Denmark; List of years in Norway

Events in the year 1704 in Norway.

== Incumbents ==
- Monarch: Frederick IV.

== Events ==
- 16 February - The Norwegian Slottsloven commission was formed.
- Moss Jernverk is established.

== Deaths ==
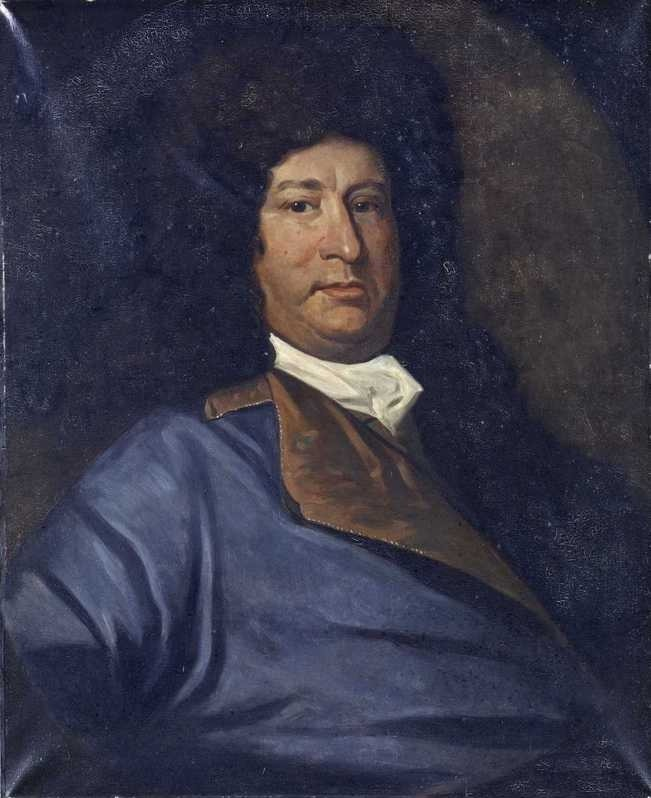
Christian Stockfleth

- 2 February – Frederik Splet, government official
- 31 March – Christian Stockfleth, civil servant (born 1639).
