= 1700 in Norway =

- Centuries: 16th; 17th; 18th; 19th
- Decades: 1680s; 1690s; 1700s; 1710s; 1720s
- See also: 1700 in Denmark; List of years in Norway

Events in the year 1700 in Norway.

== Incumbents ==
- Monarch: Frederick IV.

== Events ==
- 22 February – Great Northern War starts.
- 1 March – The Gregorian calendar is adopted.
- 18 August – The Peace of Travendal is concluded when Denmark–Norway signs a peace treaty at Traventhal House in Holstein. Denmark-Norway has to withdraw from Holstein and Sweden withdraws from Denmark. The peace will last for the next 10 years.
- The Kvitsøy bucket light is established.

== Arts and literature ==
=== Around 1700 ===
- The poem Stolt Anne is written by Hans Paus.

== Births ==
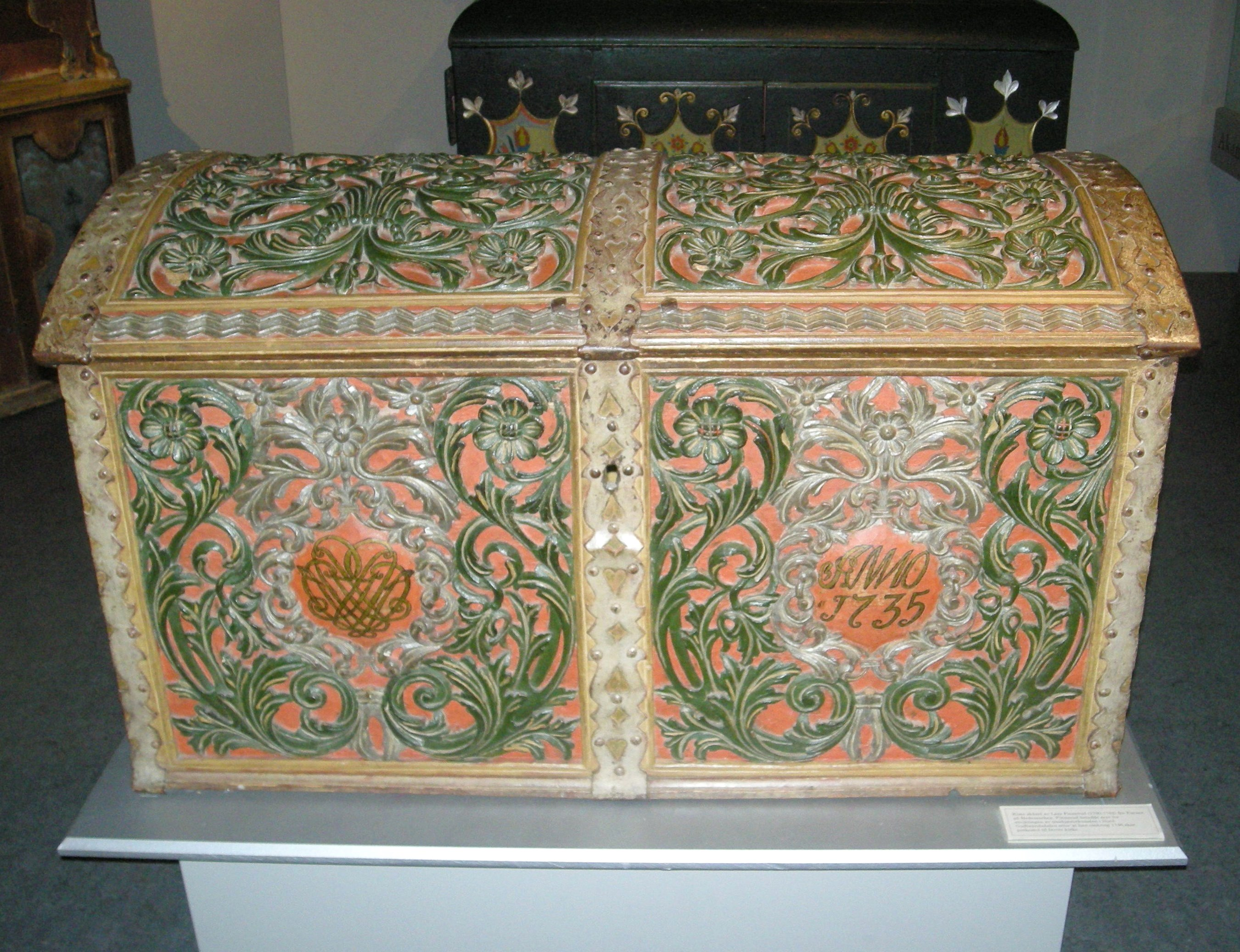
Chest carved by Lars Pinnerud (ca 1735).

- 18 August – Lars Pinnerud, woodcarver (died 1762).

== Deaths ==
- Johannes Skraastad, woodcarver (born c.1648).
