= 1701 in Norway =

- Centuries: 16th; 17th; 18th; 19th; 20th
- Decades: 1680s; 1690s; 1700s; 1710s; 1720s
- See also: 1701 in Denmark; List of years in Norway

Events in the year 1701 in Norway.

== Incumbents ==
- Monarch: Frederick IV.

== Births ==
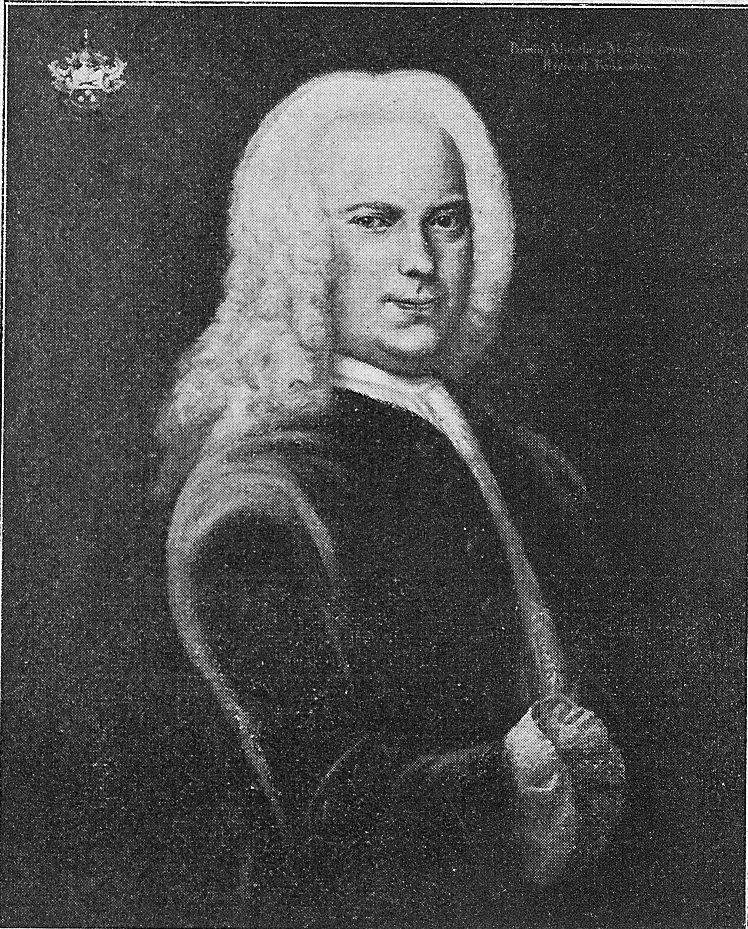
Bredo von Munthe af Morgenstierne

- 23 September – Bredo von Munthe af Morgenstierne, civil servant, Supreme Court justice and landowner (died 1757).

=== Full date missing ===
- Simen Fougner, farmer and writer (died 1783).
