= 1703 in Norway =

- Centuries: 17th; 18th; 19th; 20th
- Decades: 1680s; 1690s; 1700s; 1710s; 1720s
- See also: 1703 in Denmark; List of years in Norway

Events in the year 1703 in Norway.

== Incumbents ==
- Monarch: Frederick IV.

== Births ==
- 29 September – Baltzer Fleischer, civil servant and county governor (died 1767).
