= 1711 in Norway =

- Centuries: 16th; 17th; 18th; 19th; 20th
- Decades: 1690s; 1700s; 1710s; 1720s; 1730s
- See also: 1711 in Denmark; List of years in Norway

Events in the year 1711 in Norway.

== Incumbents ==
- Monarch: Frederick IV.

== Births ==
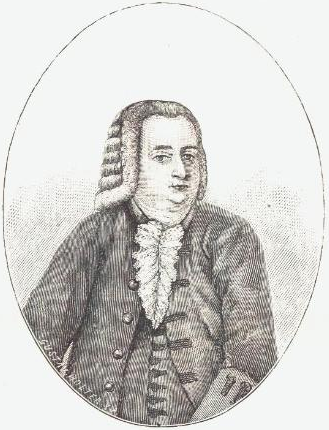
Christian Ancher

- 27 July – Christian Ancher, merchant, timber trader and ship owner (died 1765).
