= 1698 in Norway =

- Centuries: 16th; 17th; 18th; 19th
- Decades: 1670s; 1680s; 1690s; 1700s; 1710s
- See also: 1698 in Denmark; List of years in Norway

Events in the year 1698 in Norway.

== Incumbents ==
- Monarch: Christian V.

== Arts and literature ==
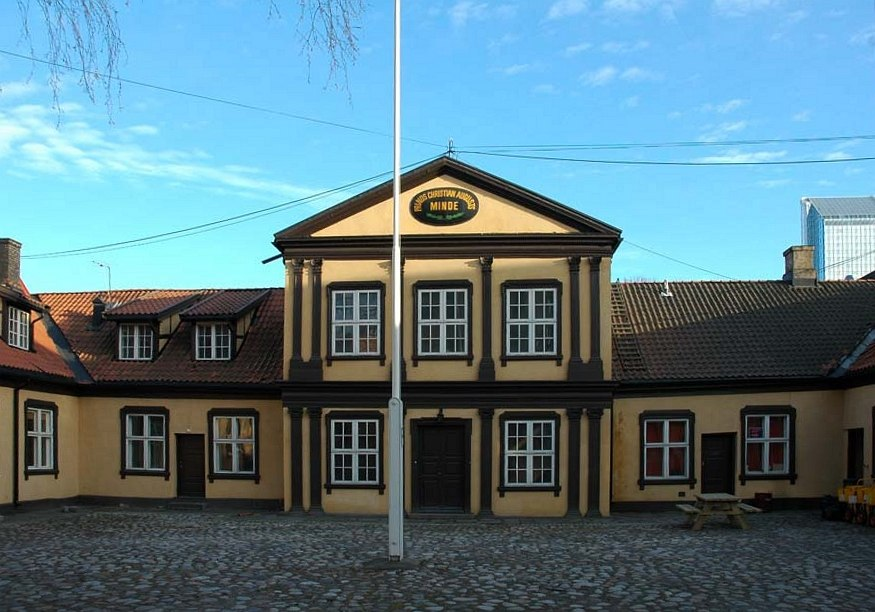
Mangelsgården

- The construction of Mangelsgården is finished.
- Dorothe Engelbretsdatter hymn and poetry book, Et kristeligt Valet fra Verden is published for the first time.

== Births ==
- Ulrik Fredrik de Cicignon, military officer (d.1772)
