= Birgitte Haldorsdatter =

Last person sentenced guilty of witchcraft in Norway

Birgitte Haldorsdatter or Birgit Haldorsdaater (fl. 1715) was the last person confirmed to have been found guilty of witchcraft in Norway.

She was prosecuted charged with having performed a curse on Hans Ernst Stenbach. She was accused of having cursed Stenbach's wedding night by placing a bag containing ashes, straws of hair and fingernails in his wedding bed. Her likely motive was that Hans Ernst Stenbach had broken a promise of marriage to her in order to marry someone else. On 10 March 1715 she was judged guilty of witchcraft in Sørum and sentenced to life imprisonment in the work house.

While witchcraft was formally a crime in Norway until 1842, Birgitte Haldorsdatter is the last person confirmed to have been judged guilty of sorcery in Norway (the last to be executed for sorcery was however Johanne Nielsdatter in 1695). There were however still witch trials in Norway in the first half of the 18th-century after Birgitte Haldorsdatter, such as those against Brita Alvern (1729) and Siri Jørgensdatter (1730).
