= 1694 in Norway =

- Centuries: 16th; 17th; 18th; 19th
- Decades: 1670s; 1680s; 1690s; 1700s; 1710s
- See also: 1694 in Denmark; List of years in Norway

Events in the year 1694 in Norway.

== Incumbents ==
- Monarch: Christian V.

== Arts and literature ==
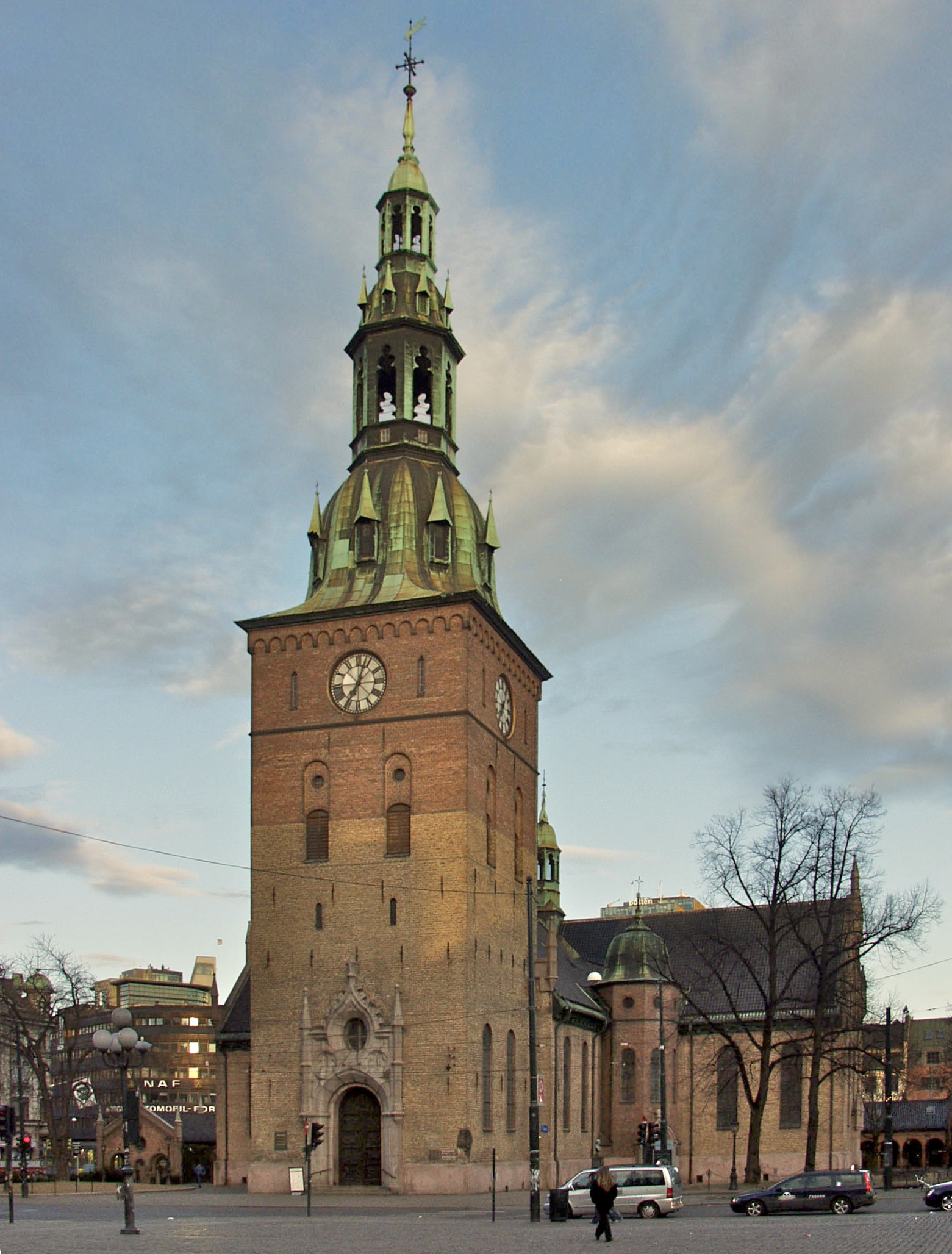
Oslo Cathedral

- The foundation stone of Oslo Cathedral was laid.

== Births ==
- 12 September – Johan von Mangelsen, military officer and businessperson (died 1769).

== Deaths ==
- 17 August – Christian Hansen Ernst, civil servant (born c. 1660).
- Andrew Lawrenceson Smith, craftsman, woodcutter and painter (born c. 1620).
