= 1628 in Norway =

- Centuries: 16th; 17th; 18th; 19th
- Decades: 1600s; 1610s; 1620s; 1630s; 1640s
- See also: 1628 in Denmark; List of years in Norway

Events in the year 1628 in Norway.

== Incumbents ==
- Monarch: Christian IV.

== Events ==
- 18 January - The Norwegian Army is established.
  - Jens Juel was appointed the first commander-in-chief of the Norwegian army.
