= 1708 in Norway =

- Centuries: 16th; 17th; 18th; 19th; 20th
- Decades: 1680s; 1690s; 1700s; 1710s; 1720s
- See also: 1708 in Denmark; List of years in Norway

Events in the year 1708 in Norway.

== Incumbents ==
- Monarch: Frederick IV.

== Events ==
- 10 April - Johan Vibe is appointed Vice Steward of Norway.

== Births ==
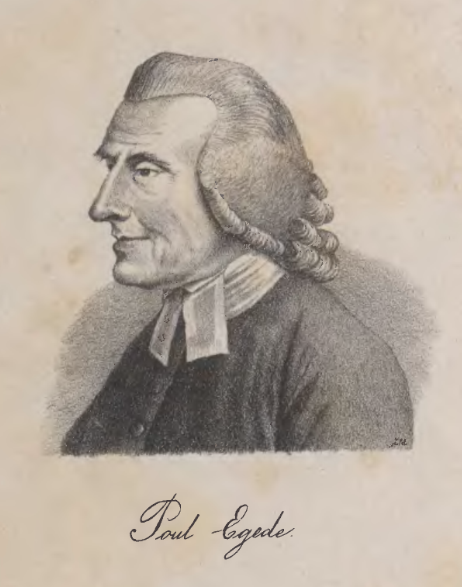
Paul Egede

- 9 September – Paul Egede, theologian, missionary, and scholar (d. 1789)
- 10 September - Mathias Collett, civil servant (d. 1759).
- 16 September – Catharina Freymann, pietist leader (d. 1791)

== Deaths ==
- 28 October – Prince George of Denmark and Norway (born 1653)
- 25 December - Jørgen Thormøhlen, merchant, ship owner and industrialist (born c. 1640).
