= Munkholmen =

Island in Trøndelag, Norway

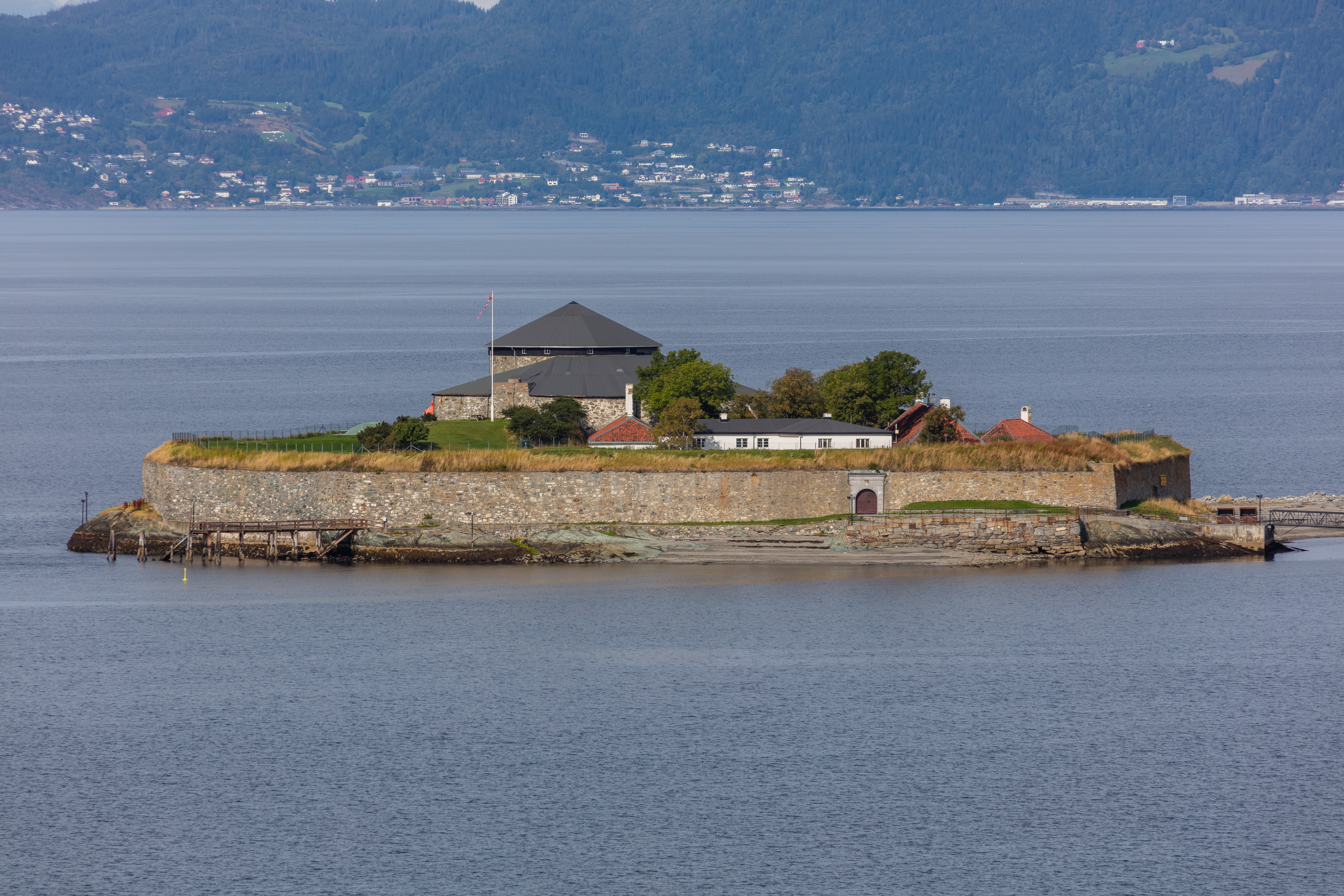
- Interactive map of Munkholmen

Geography
- Location: Trøndelag, Norway
- Coordinates: 63.4515°N 10.3825°E
- Area: 13,000 m^{2} (140,000 sq ft)
- Length: 480 m (1570 ft)
- Width: 200 m (700 ft)

Administration
- Norway
- County: Trøndelag
- Municipality: Trondheim Municipality

Additional information
- Official website: https://www.munkholmenbat.no

Munkholmen (Norwegian: Monk's islet) is an islet in Trondheim Municipality in Trøndelag county, Norway. The 13,000-square-metre (3.2-acre) island sits in the Trondheimsfjord about 1.3 kilometres (0.81 mi) northwest of the island of Brattøra and the mouth of the river Nidelva in the center of the city of Trondheim. The islet has served as a place of execution, a monastery, a fortress, a prison, and a World War II anti-aircraft gun station. Today, Munkholmen is a popular tourist attraction and recreation site.

== History ==
In the years prior to the founding of the city of Trondheim in 997 by King Olav Tryggvason, Munkholmen had been used as an execution site by the Jarls of Lade. The arrival of Olav Tryggvason to Norway in 995 coincided with a revolt against Haakon Sigurdsson, who was killed by Tormod Kark. The severed heads of both Haakon and Kark were placed on stakes on Munkholmen facing out into the fjord to serve as a warning to visitors. The tradition of displaying the severed heads of criminals and political opponents was continued for some time, but the heads were now placed so that they faced the city of Trondheim to deter its citizens from committing crimes.

=== Nidarholm Abbey ===
The term Munkholmen was not originally in common usage. Rather, the site was known as the location of the monastery at Nidarholm. In the early 12th century, and possibly even earlier, Benedictine monks lived on the island in Nidarholm Abbey. The monastery burned down three times during the Middle Ages, the last time in 1531. By the time that Lutheran Protestantism came to Trondheim, the buildings had fallen into decay and the former monastery came under the ownership of the royal estate in Trondheim. The monastery buildings disappeared during the 17th century as Munkholmen was fortified.

=== Fort and prison ===
Construction of a fort on the island began in 1658 following the Swedish siege of Trondheim during the Dano-Swedish War in 1658-1660. When it was completed in 1661, the fort was also used as a state prison for society's rejects. Count Peder Griffenfeld, Munkholmen's most famous prisoner, was transferred from the fortress of Copenhagen in 1671. Griffenfeld was kept at Munkholmen for 18 years, after which he was released, having contracted a terminal illness. From 1700 to 1704, the commander of the fort was Major Curt Christoph von Koppelow. The fort remained in operation until 1893. In 1790, the Swedish naval officer Lars Benzelstierna was imprisoned on Munkholmen for his plan to use a fireship to burn the Russian fleet anchored at Copenhagen during the Russo-Swedish War of 1788–1790.

=== German occupation ===
Nazi Germany invaded and occupied Norway in 1940. After capturing Trondheim early on in the Norwegian Campaign, the Germans quickly established a submarine base, exploiting the natural protection provided by the fjord. At this time, Munkholmen was fitted with anti-aircraft weaponry. A large portion of the fort was retrofitted to hold ammunition, and the flooring planks were nailed in with wooden nails to prevent explosions caused by soldiers' hobnail boots striking metal nails. The German occupying forces remained in Norway until the end of the war in Europe in May 1945. Remnants of the installation still exist in the upper levels of the fort.

== Gallery ==
The courtyard

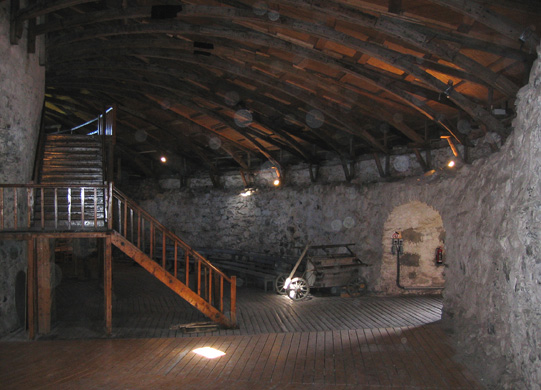
Inside the round tower

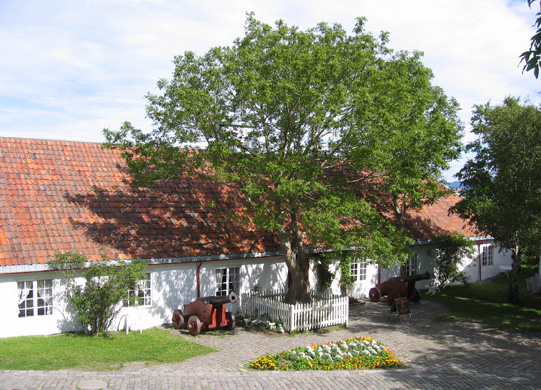
Commander of the residence at Munkholmen

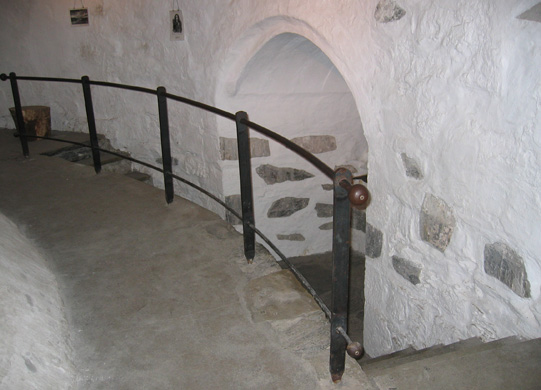
Former entrance to Griffenfeld prison cell

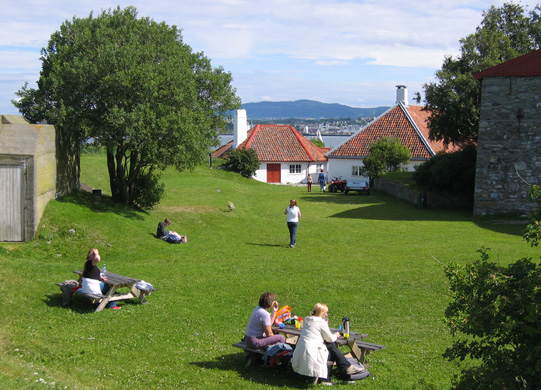
Munkholmen is a popular destination

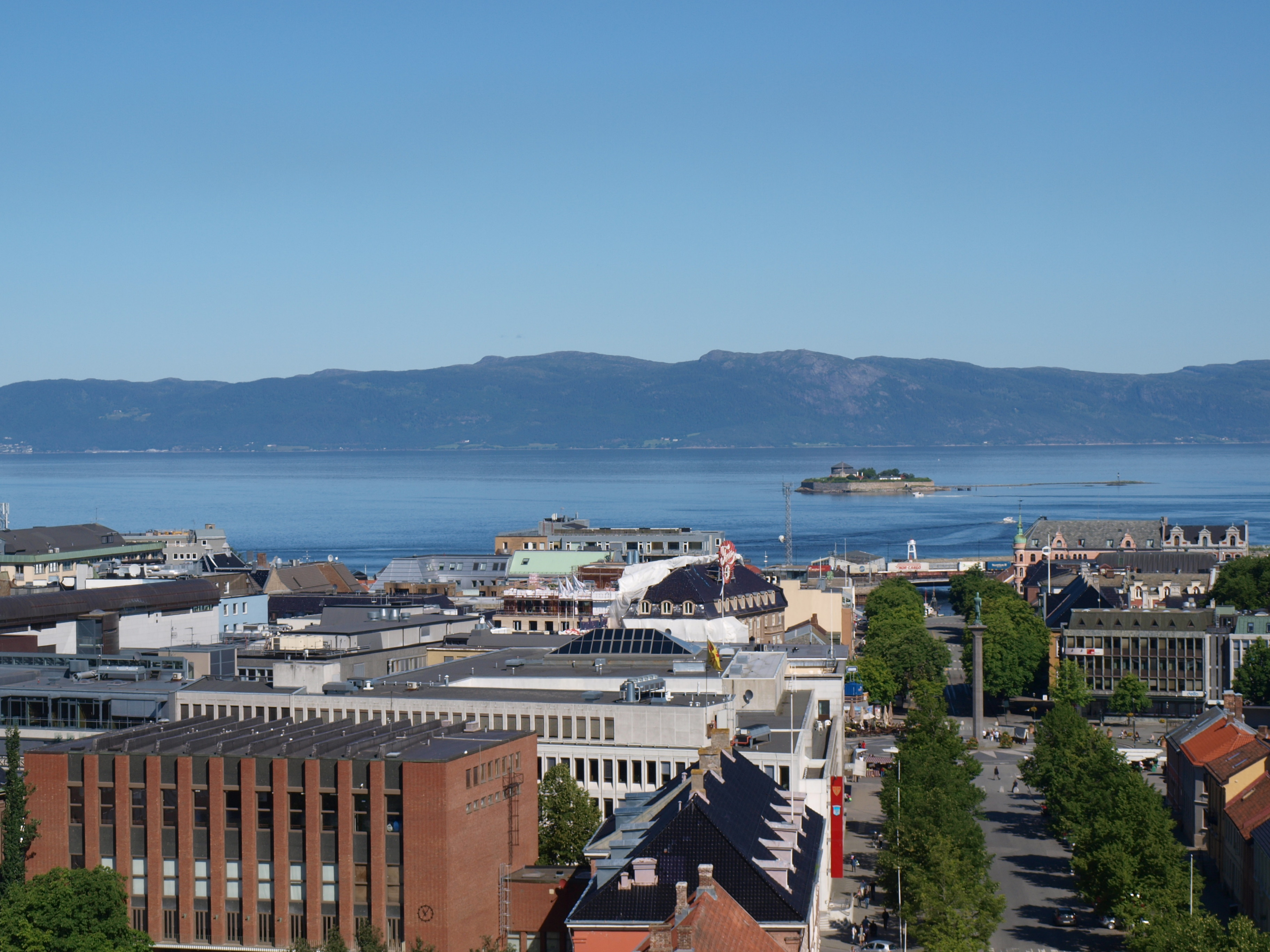
View from Trondheim city centre in 2010

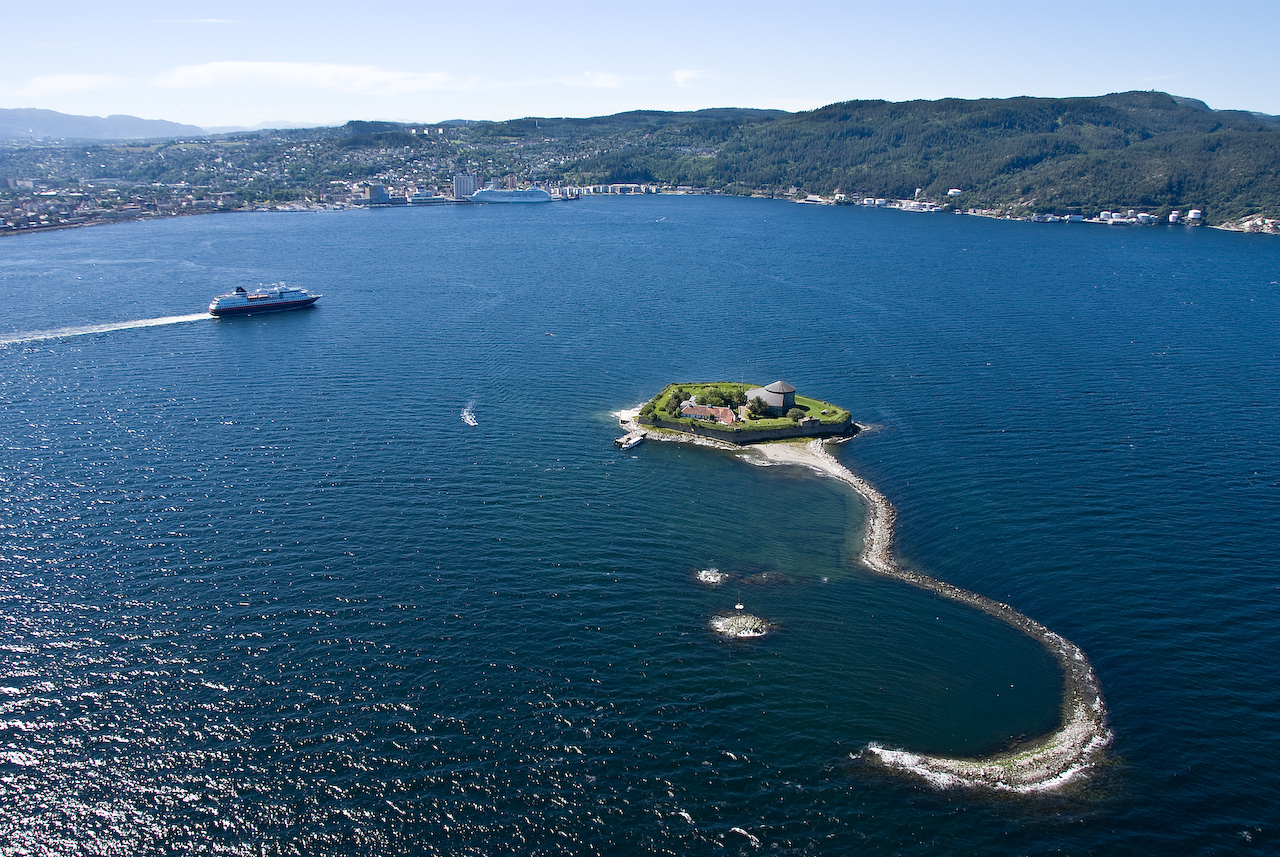
Munkholmen looking south to the city of Trondheim

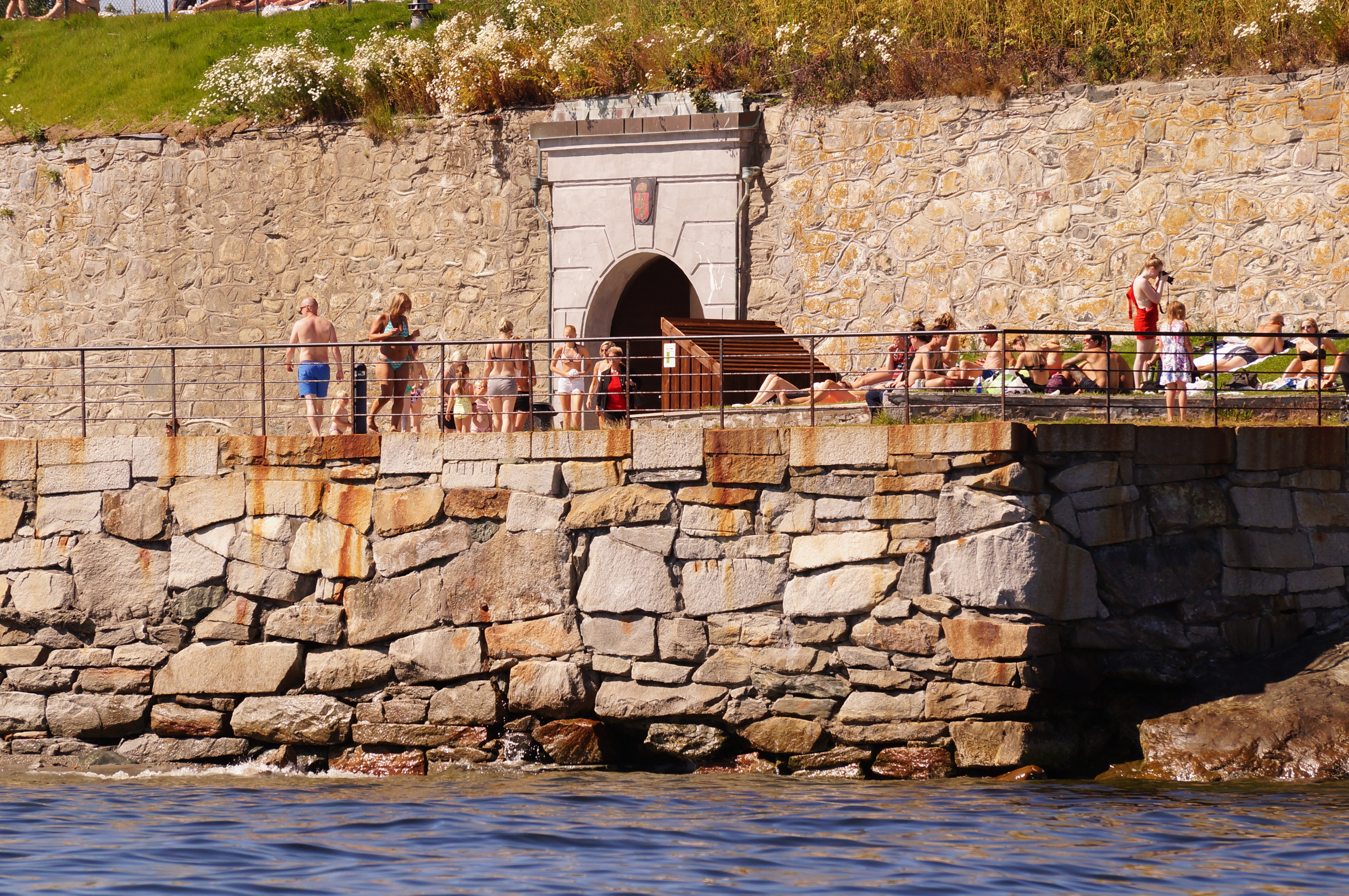
Munkholmen is popular during the summer

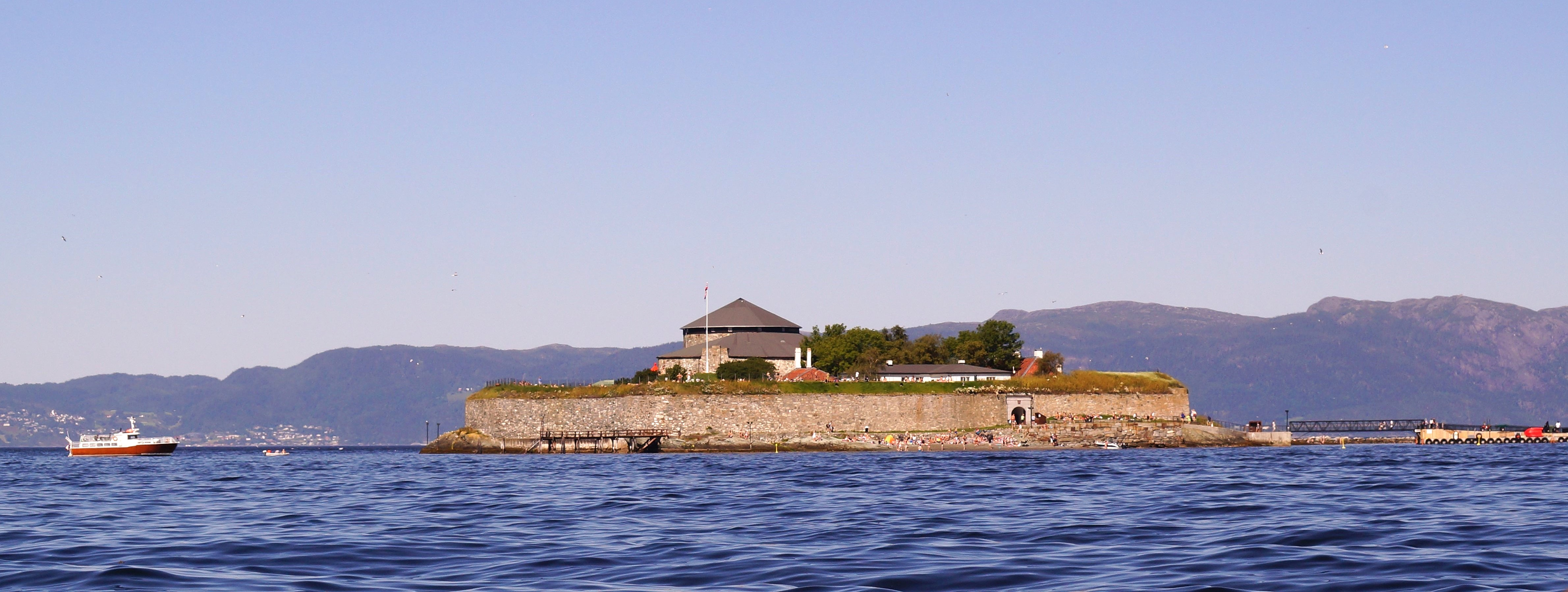

== Tourism and recreation ==
Today, Munkholmen is a popular summertime tourist attraction and hangout for residents of Trondheim. From May to September, boats depart from Ravnkloa on a regular basis. Once on the island, visitors can take a guided tour (in English and Norwegian) or roam freely. There's also a small cafe/restaurant available.
