= Christian Stub =

Norwegian jurist, law historian and civil servant

Christian Stub (1693 – 18 December 1736) was a Norwegian jurist, law historian and civil servant. He was born in Christiania (now Oslo), Norway and attended the Christiania Latin School. He graduated from the University of Copenhagen in 1714. He subsequently worked as a customs inspector in Copenhagen and later at Bergen. From 1731 to 1735 he served as General Customs Manager for the part of Norway north of the Dovrefjell mountain range.

Between 1716 and 1719, he published an important work in four volumes (Dissertatio I–IV historico-juridica de lege et legislatoribus Danorum) on the history of law in Denmark.
