= Battle of Uddevalla =

1677 battle

- Part of the Scanian War
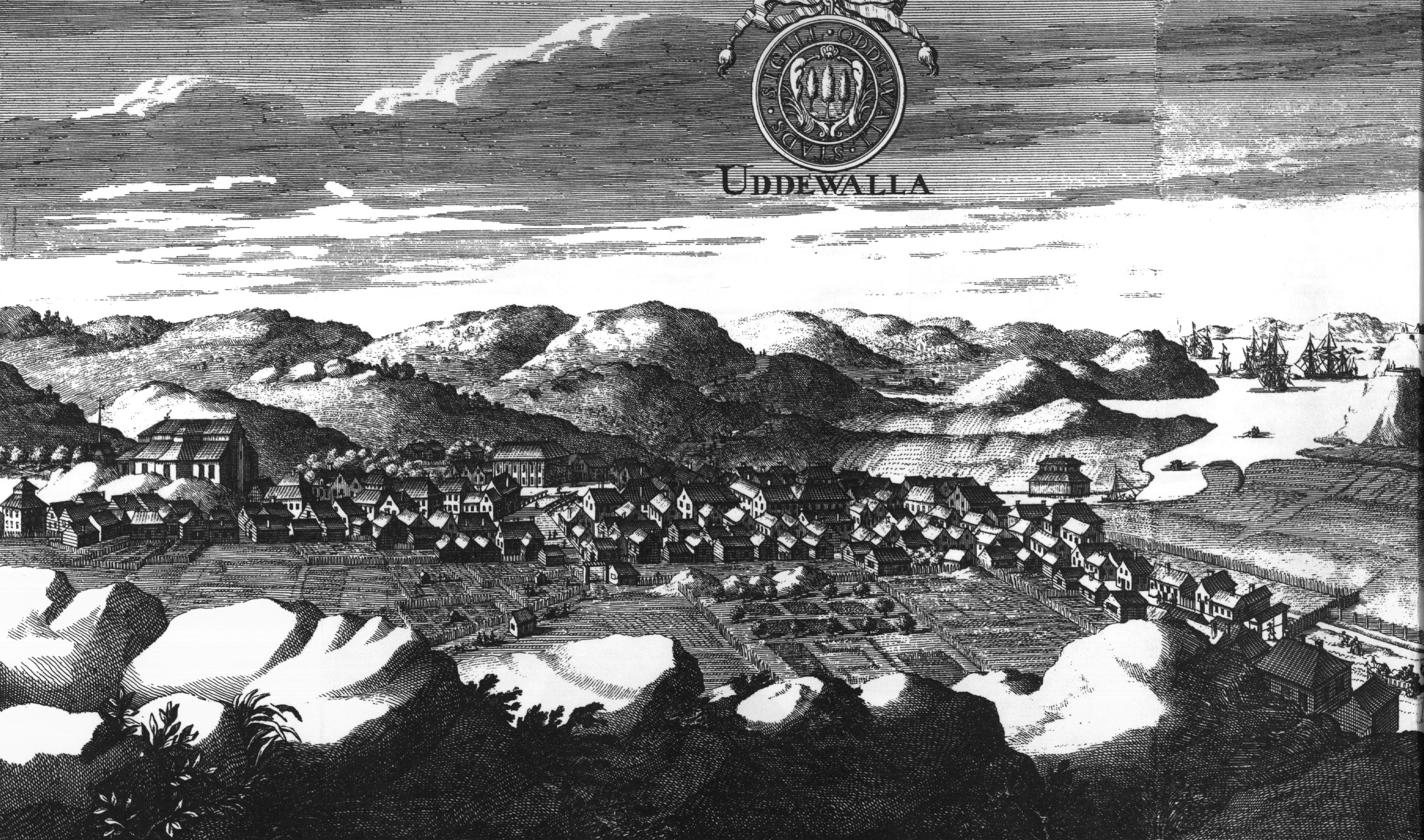
- Uddevalla around 1700
Date	August 28, 1677
Location	Uddevalla 58°20′57″N 11°56′17″E
Result	Dano–Norwegian victory

Belligerents
(yes) Swedish Empire	Denmark–Norway

Commanders and leaders
(Swedish Empire) Magnus de la Gradie	(Denmark–Norway) Ulrik Fredrik Gyldenløve

Strength
3,000	5,600

Casualties and losses
500	Unknown, similar to the Swedes

The Battle of Uddevalla took place at Uddevalla on August 28, 1677 as part of the Scanian War.

== Prelude ==
After the fall of Marstrand to the Norwegians, Gothenburg had become vulnerably exposed. Magnus Gabriel de la Gardie assembled a force of 3,000 Swedes of which 1,200 were fresh cavalry recruits and 1,500 were impressed Dalecarlians. The force camped at Vänersborg on August 10, and moved from there to Uddevalla. However, a strong Danish-Norwegian force of 5,600 men led by Ulrik Fredrik Gyldenløve was approaching from Norway and caught up with the Swedish force.

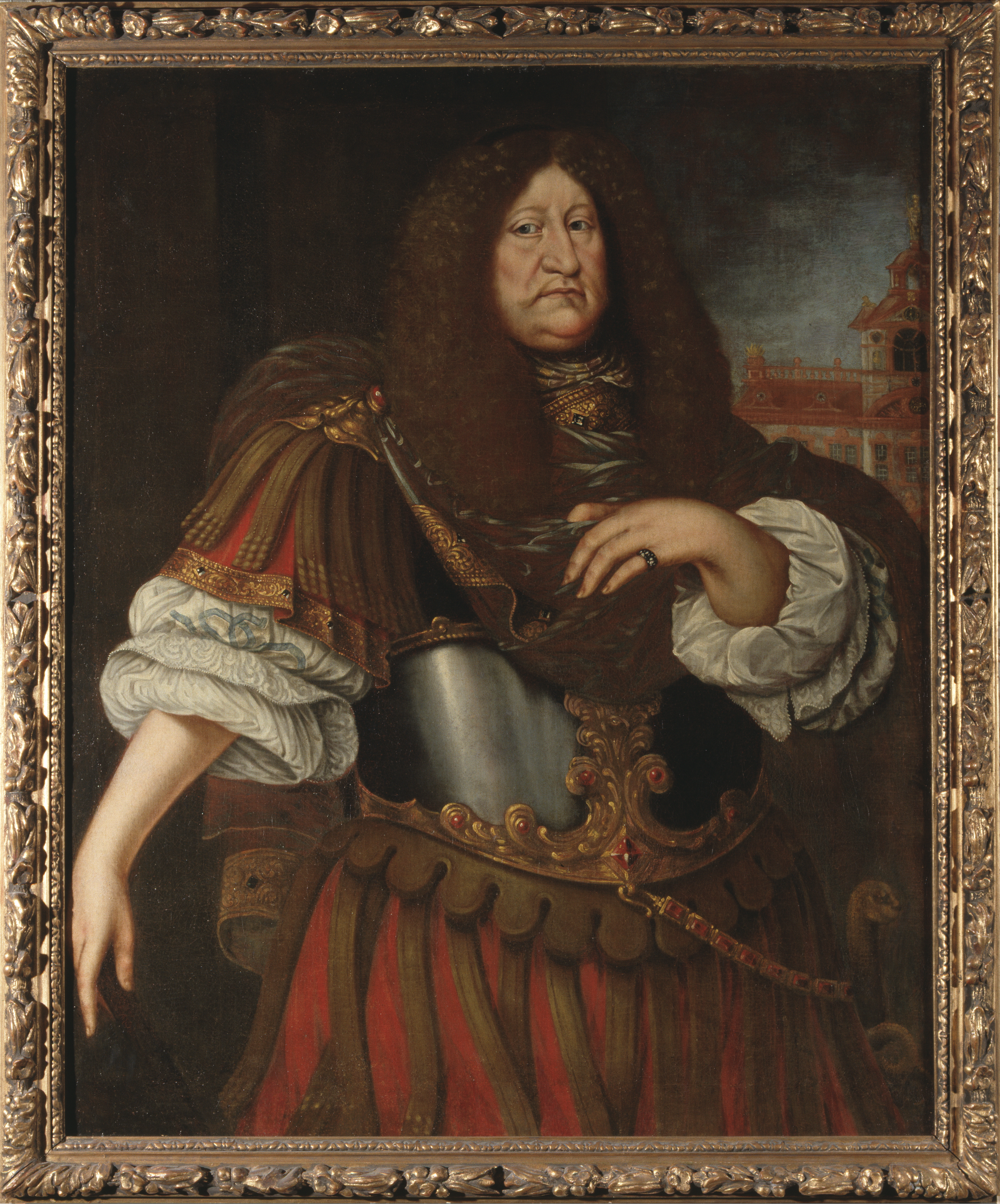
Magnus Gabriel De la Gardie av Richard Sylvius (Nationalmuseum)

De La Gardie who was in ill health had requested to be released from his post was expecting his brother-in-law, Per Sparre to arrive and take over command of the forces.

== Battle ==
De la Gardie deployed his troops for a set-piece defence, but the Gyldenløve began flanking the Swedes, attempting to cut off their escape route to the river Göta älv. De la Gardie had to order his cavalry to cover the Swedish infantry's retreat to the river, but when the superior Danish cavalry charged the Swedish cavalry, it ran away without firing a shot. De la Gardie himself was almost captured, and the battle devolved into a disorganized rout (a Danish source described the Swedes "scampering like hares among the rocks"). Only at Kuru Bro (Kuröd bro), 5 km east of Uddevalla, did the fleeing Swedes make a stand. The Dalecarlians held their positions, their pikes defending the bridge from the attacking cavalry until the Swedish force had crossed, after which the bridge was demolished.

== Aftermath ==
The Swedish army reached safety behind Göta Älv, but its losses amounted to 500 men and 9 cannons. The outcome of the battle was blamed on the poorly trained Swedish troops and the incompetence of de la Gardie as a military leader. After the battle, he requested and was relieved of his command, with sharp reprimands from Charles XI.

Gyldenlöwe occupied the town for a few months until September of that same year when he and some of his forces departed for Christiania. Uddevalla however remained occupied by the enemy artillery which surrounded the town.

In 20 July 1679, Gustaf Otto Stenbock arrived in Uddevalla after having liberated Göteborg and pursued the Danish enemy forces back to Uddevalla.

After some skirmishes with the enemy and attempts at to forge a truce with Gyldenlöwe they were reached by the news that Denmark and Sweden had reached a truce. This was concluded by the Peace of Lund (1679) after which Gyldenlöwe and the occupying army retreated from Uddevalla.
