= Brita Alvern =

Norwegian woman accused of witchcraft

- Known for: Being accused of witchcraft in 1729
- Criminal charge: Witchcraft
- Relatives: Ole Alvern (brother)

Brita Alvern (fl. 1729) was an alleged Norwegian witch. She was accused of sorcery in 1729, in one of the last witch trials in Scandinavia. As the documentation of the trial is incomplete, it is unknown whether she was executed or not. Her trial is regarded as notable, as it illustrates the witch trials at the outbreak of a new age and a conflict between a public that still believed in witches and authorities that had become skeptical despite the law.

== The case ==
Brita Alvern was put on trial and accused of witchcraft at Indredale Skipreide in Sunnfjord on 19 February 1729. She was reported by the bailiff Hugo Friderich Mortensen upon the request of the parish vicar and the public. She denied the charges. When the bailiff applied to the higher court for permission to pursue the case further, he was met with the reply that if he wished to do so, he must do so on his own responsibility and risk his reputation, because witch trials were nonsense which were infamous for having led to the condemnation of innocent in the past. The bailiff had the support of the church, which he pointed out, but was met with the reply that the church was not to be involved in such matters.

Nevertheless, on 9 August 1729, Alvern was put on trial, now together with her brother Ole. This time, Brita Alvern confessed to having met Satan in the shape of a human with red claws, who had given her the ability to inflict sickness upon humans and animals, while Ole confessed to having been given the ability to cure gout and bleeding. The bailiff again applied to the higher authority to pursue the case further. This time, he was met with the reply that if it was necessary to continue, he should do it quickly.

It is not known what happened after this, because the documents of the rest of the trial are missing. As Brita and Ole had confessed to their guilt, they were might have been sentenced to death. If so, they were likely the last people in Norway to have been executed for sorcery. The next year a woman named Siri Jørgensdatter confessed to being a witch, but the court decided that Siri Jørgensdatter had made up the story, and the case was therefore dismissed. The same could have happened to Brita and Ole.

== Context ==
This was not the last witch trial in Norway: in 1732, six people in Romsdalen county were sentenced for sorcery, though they were not executed, and in 1754, Susanne Monsdatter was tried in Hordaland. The 18th-century Norwegian witch trials, however, either did not lead to death sentences, or the documentation appears to have been missing. The last confirmed execution for sorcery in Norway was that of Johanne Nilsdatter in Kvæfjord in Troms in 1695.
