= Johanne Nielsdatter =

Norwegian woman condemned for witchcraft

Johanne Nielsdatter or Johanne Nilsdatter (died 1695) was a Norwegian woman who was executed for witchcraft. Her execution is the last confirmed execution for witchcraft in Norway.

== Life ==
She was from Kvæfjord in present-day Troms county. Almost nothing is known about her. She was arrested in March and put on trial in April. During her imprisonment, Niels Nielsen Rasch was responsible for her upkeep, and she was likely cared for by his daughter Gertrud Rask.

She was accused of having renounced her baptism, religion and her God to Satan in exchange for a personal demon named Knut and the ability to use magic. She admitted to have caused sickness and death on others and to have caused a boat to sink by affecting the weather through magic. She was judged guilty as charged and sentenced to be executed by burning.

Johanne Nielsdatter is the last person confirmed to have been executed for sorcery in Norway. She was not the last to be executed by burning, however, as this execution method was used for bestiality until at least 1757. During the 18th century, there were more witch trials in Norway, but they either did not result in death sentences, or the documentation of them are missing and the verdict is unknown. Such was the case in the cases of Birgitte Haldorsdatter, Brita Alvern, and Siri Jørgensdatter. The law against witchcraft was abolished in 1842.
