= Siri Jørgensdatter =

Norwegian peasant girl prosecuted for witchcraft (born 1717)

Siri Jørgensdatter (1717-?) was a Norwegian peasant girl, one of the last people confirmed to have been prosecuted for witchcraft in Norway.

She was interrogated by the authorities in Oppland on the charge of witchcraft, after having confessed to her parish vicar that her grandmother used to take her to Satan's Witches' Sabbath. The vicar reported her to the Bishop and the Governor, which resulted in her being put on trial for sorcery in 1730. She stated that her grandmother had smeared a pig with ointment and used it to fly with her to Satan, who had given her food and bit her ear, where she was then unable to feel pain. Her grandmother had milked knives which she had stabbed the wall with, and given Siri a cup with ointment she could use for flying. Siri had decided to report herself as a witch, despite protests from the small demons, and reported two women as her accomplices.

Witcraft was still formally illegal in Norway, and only fifteen years prior, Birgitte Haldorsdatter had been judged guilty of sorcery. However, at this point in time, judges were normally sceptical toward witchcraft charges. The court decided that Siri Jørgensdatter had made up the story, which was obviously influenced by the widely publicized Mora witch trials, and the case was therefore dismissed. Siri Jørgensdatter was released and the matter did not go further.
