= Marquis of Lista =

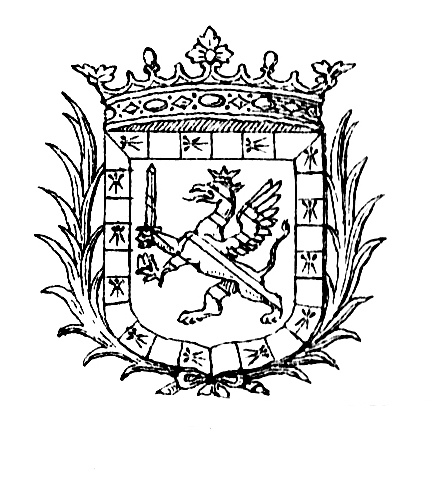
Coat of arms by Anders Thiset.

Marquis of Lister (Norwegian: Markis av Lista; location now spelled Lista but grant uses older form) was a title of the Norwegian nobility. Lista lies in Southern Norway.

The title was given to the Italian Hugo Octavius Accoramboni of Florence by Frederick IV of Norway on 22 April 1709.

The coat of arms of the Marquis of Lister is described in the Encyclopedia of Noble Families in Denmark, Norway, and the Duchies (Lexicon over adelige familier i Danmark, Norge og Hertugdømmerne). A book by Amund Helland cites the following description in Danish:

Skioldet rødt, kantet med en af Guld og Hermelin sammensat Rand, deri en opreist sølv Grif, holdende i venstre Forben et guld Bierg, i høire et draget Sverd, fire blaae høire Skraabielker over hele Skioldemærket. Paa Skioldet en markgrevelig Krone. Hele Vaabenet er omgivet af to sammensatte Palmegrene.

In English:

The shield [is] red, bordered with an of gold and ermine composed bordure, therein a rampant silver gryphon holding in the left paw a golden mountain, in the right a sword in a hand, four blue right bends over the whole arms. Upon the shield a coronet of a marquis. The whole coat of arms is surrounded by two joint palm branches.

== See also ==
- Marquis of Mandal
