= Marquis of Mandal =

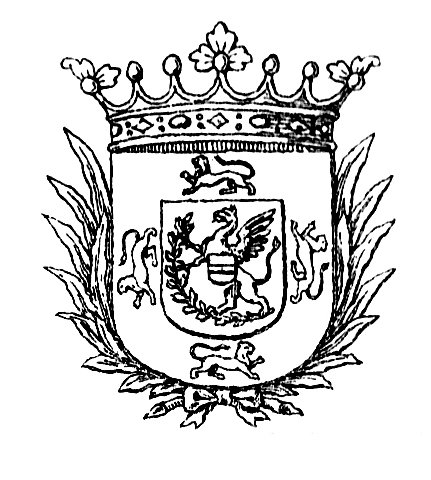
Coat of arms by Anders Thiset.

Marquis of Mandal (Norwegian: Markis av Mandal) was a title of the Norwegian nobility. Mandal lies in Southern Norway.

The title was given to the Italians Francisco di Ratta (died 1716) and to his nephews Giuseppe di Ratta (died 1725) and Luigi di Ratta of Bologna by Frederick IV of Norway on 24 November 1710. Neither Francisco di Ratta, Marquis of Mandal, nor Giuseppe di Ratta, Marquis of Mandal, was married. Luigi di Ratta, Marquis of Mandal, was married. His family became patrilineally extinct with the death of his great-grandson, Benedetto di Ratta, Marquis of Mandal (born 1809).

The coat of arms of the Marquis of Mandal is described in the Encyclopedia of Noble Families in Denmark, Norway, and the Duchies (Lexicon over adelige familier i Danmark, Norge og Hertugdømmerne). A book by Amund Helland cites the following description in Danish:

Skioldet Guld, deri en til høire i en grøn Laurbærgren opreist staaende grøn Grif, med aabent Gab, udrakt rød Tunge og opreist Hale. Ved Siden af Griffen et lidet Sølv Skiold, hvorudi en rød Bielke. Omkring det store Skiold er en rød Indfatning, belagt oven, neden og ved Siderne med fire efter hinanden gaaende Guld Løver med opreiste Haler, aabne Gabe og røde udstrakte Tunger. Paa Skioldet er en Markgrevelig Krone. Hele Vaabenet staar i tvende med et rødt Baand nedentil sammenbundne grønne Palmegrene.

In English:

The shield [is of] gold, therein a to the right in a green laurel branch rampant standing gryphon, with open mouth, extended red tongue and raised tail. By the side of the gryphon a small silver shield, wherein a red beam. Around the big shield is a red surrounding, [on which] above, under, and on the sides four after each other walking gold lions with raised tails, open mouths, and [udstrakte] tongues. On the shield a coronet of a marquis. The whole coat of arms stands in two with a red bond below together-tied green palm branches.

== See also ==
- Marquis of Lista
