= Didrik Muus =

Norwegian artist (1633–1706)

Didrik Nielssøn Muus (1633 – 7 February 1706) was a Norwegian priest, painter, copper engraver and sculptor.

Muus was born at Stange in Hedmark county, Norway. He was the son of Niels Rasmussen Muus (1595–1663) and Marichen Didriksdatter Nøff (died ca 1660). Muus attended school in Roskilde and began studying theology at the University of Copenhagen in 1653. He graduated in 1659. He served as chaplain to the priest at Ringsaker Church from 1661. In 1686, Muus was offered the position of vicar at Stord Church, where he would serve for the next 20 years. He painted several altarpieces, epitaphs and portraits, and is regarded as a forerunner of other artists.

== Personal life ==
Muus married around the year 1667 to a noblewoman and widow, Maren Skaktavl (1624–1718). He died at Stord in Nordre Bergenhus county in 1706.
