= Bjørn Frøysåk =

Norwegian farmer and merchant

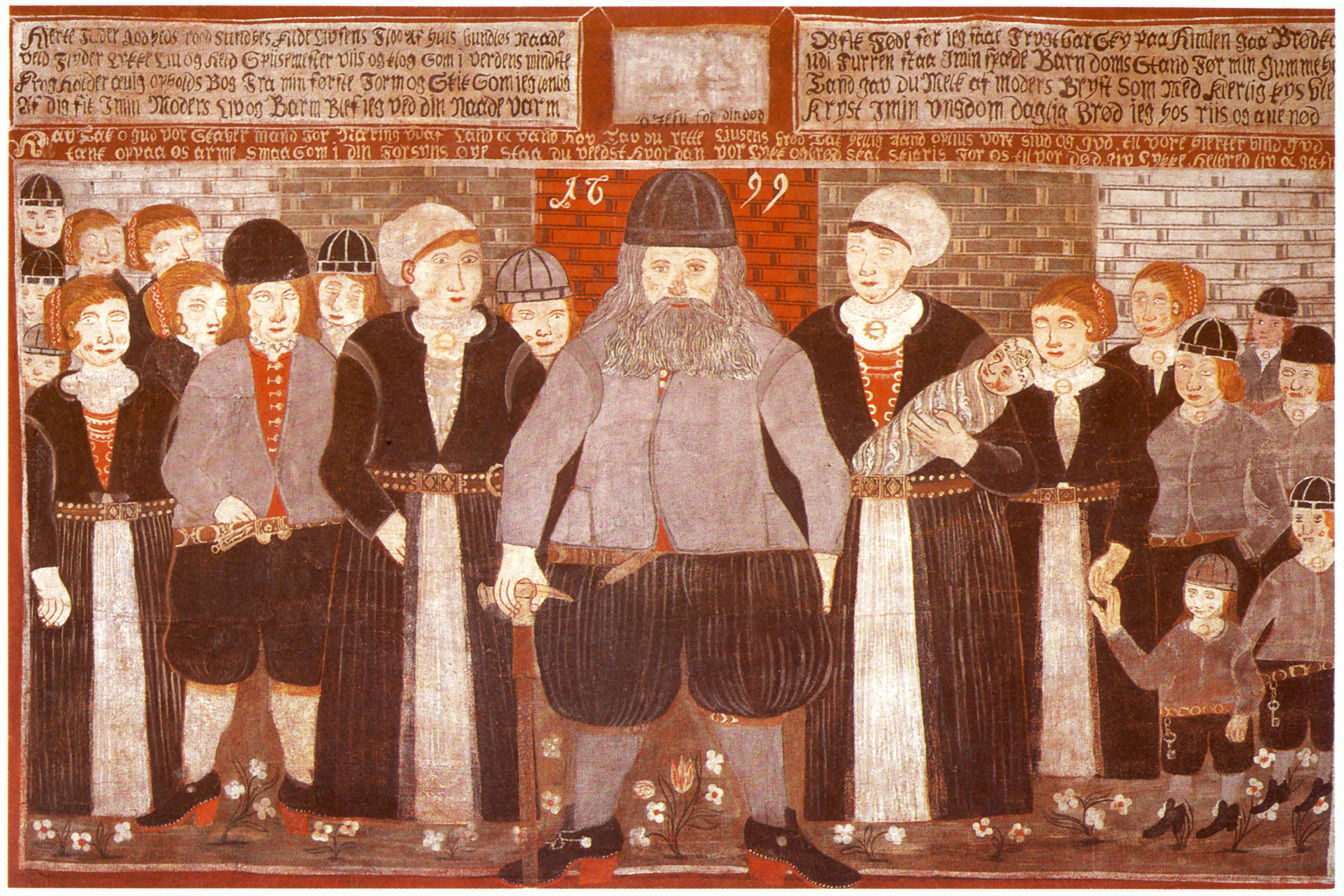
Bjørn Frøysåk with his family (including deceased members). Painting from 1699.

Bjørn Tolleivson Frøysåk (1634 – 1709) was a Norwegian farmer and merchant.

Frøysåk was born at Gol in Buskerud, Norway. He was born into one of the major farming families in Hallingdal. His father, Tolleiv Arneson Frøysåk (1605–1677), had owned several properties. Frøysåk worked as a farmer all his life. In addition to farming, Frøysåk took part in timber trade and trading of real estate, and ran a coaching inn.

Frøysåk was married twice. With Ingebjørg Hersgård (died 1680), he had seven children. With Guri Tolleivsgard (1659–1733), he had eight children. Frøysåk is particularly known for a painted epitaph from 1699, showing Frøysåk with his family (both his wives including the deceased Ingebjørg and children). The epitaph, originally in Gol Stave Church, was relocated to the Norwegian Museum of Cultural History in 1906.
