= 1692 in Norway =

- Centuries: 16th; 17th; 18th; 19th
- Decades: 1670s; 1680s; 1690s; 1700s; 1710s
- See also: 1692 in Denmark; List of years in Norway

Events in the year 1692 in Norway.

== Incumbents ==
- Monarch: Christian V.

== Events ==
- February – The last of the Finmark witch trials takes place, Anders Poulsen, an old Sámi shaman is put on trial.
- The first Chief of police is hired in Bergen.
- The Bolvik ironwork is established.

=== Cuisine ===
- 13 June - The first known recipe for Bløtkake is written down.

== Arts and literature ==
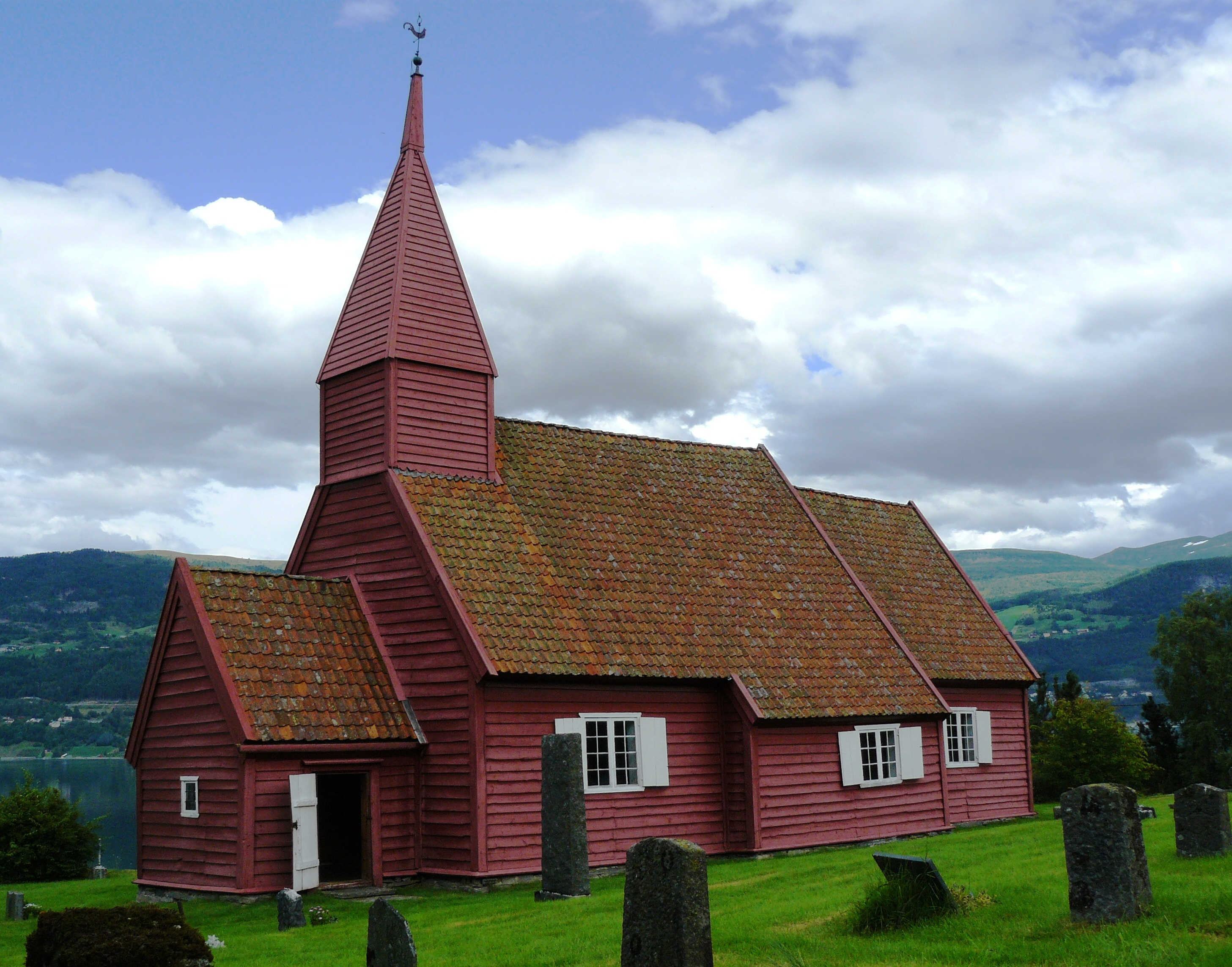
Old Gimmestad Church from 1692

- Old Gimmestad Church is built.

== Births ==
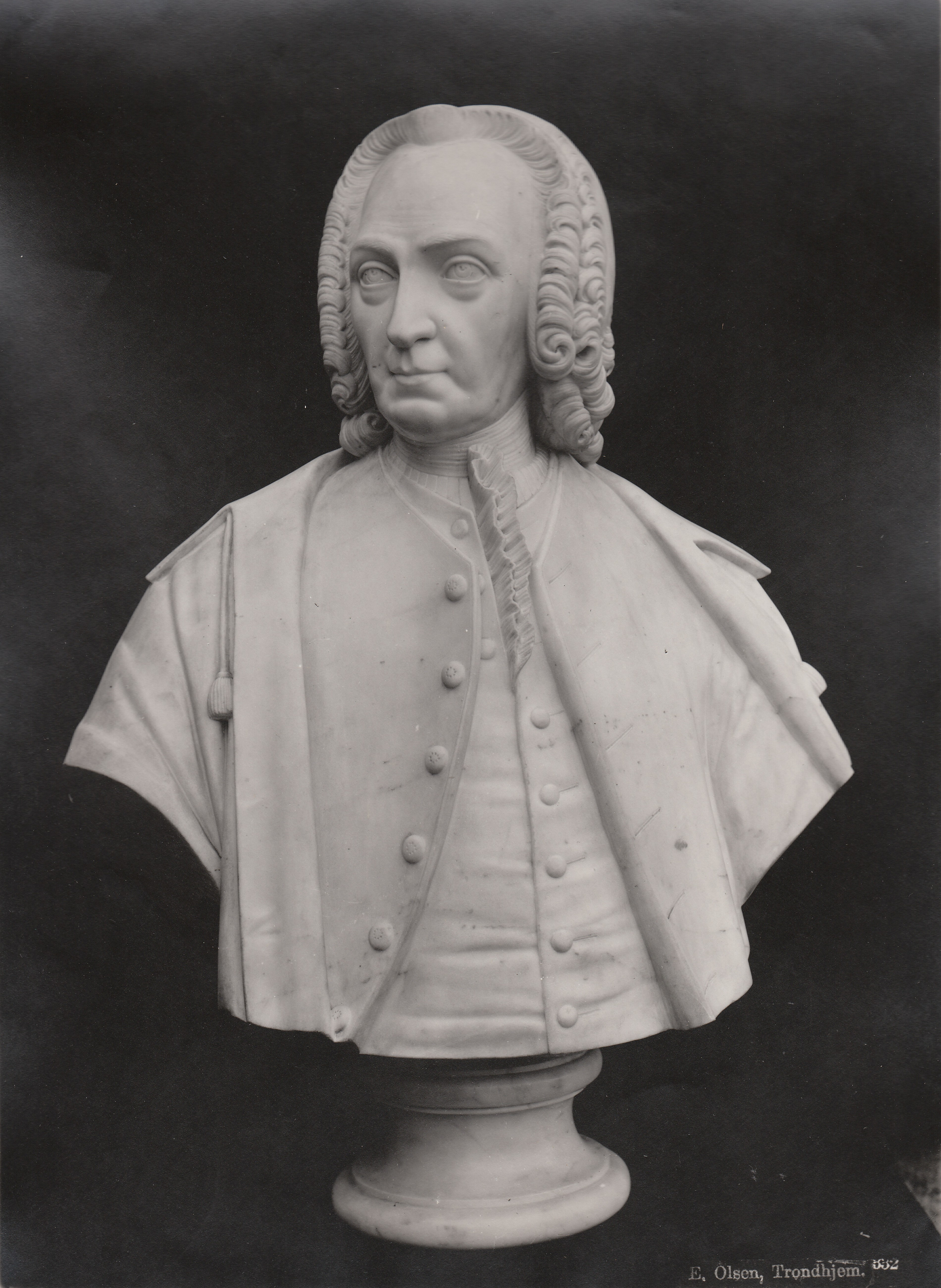
Thomas Angell

- 29 December – Thomas Angell, merchant, philanthropist (died 1767).

== Deaths ==
- 11 February – Anders Paulsen, Sami noaidi (born c. 1600).
