= 1687 in Norway =

- Centuries: 17th; 18th; 19th
- Decades: 1660s; 1670s; 1680s; 1690s; 1700s
- See also: 1687 in Denmark; List of years in Norway

Events in the year 1687 in Norway:

== Incumbents ==
- Monarch: Christian V

== Events ==
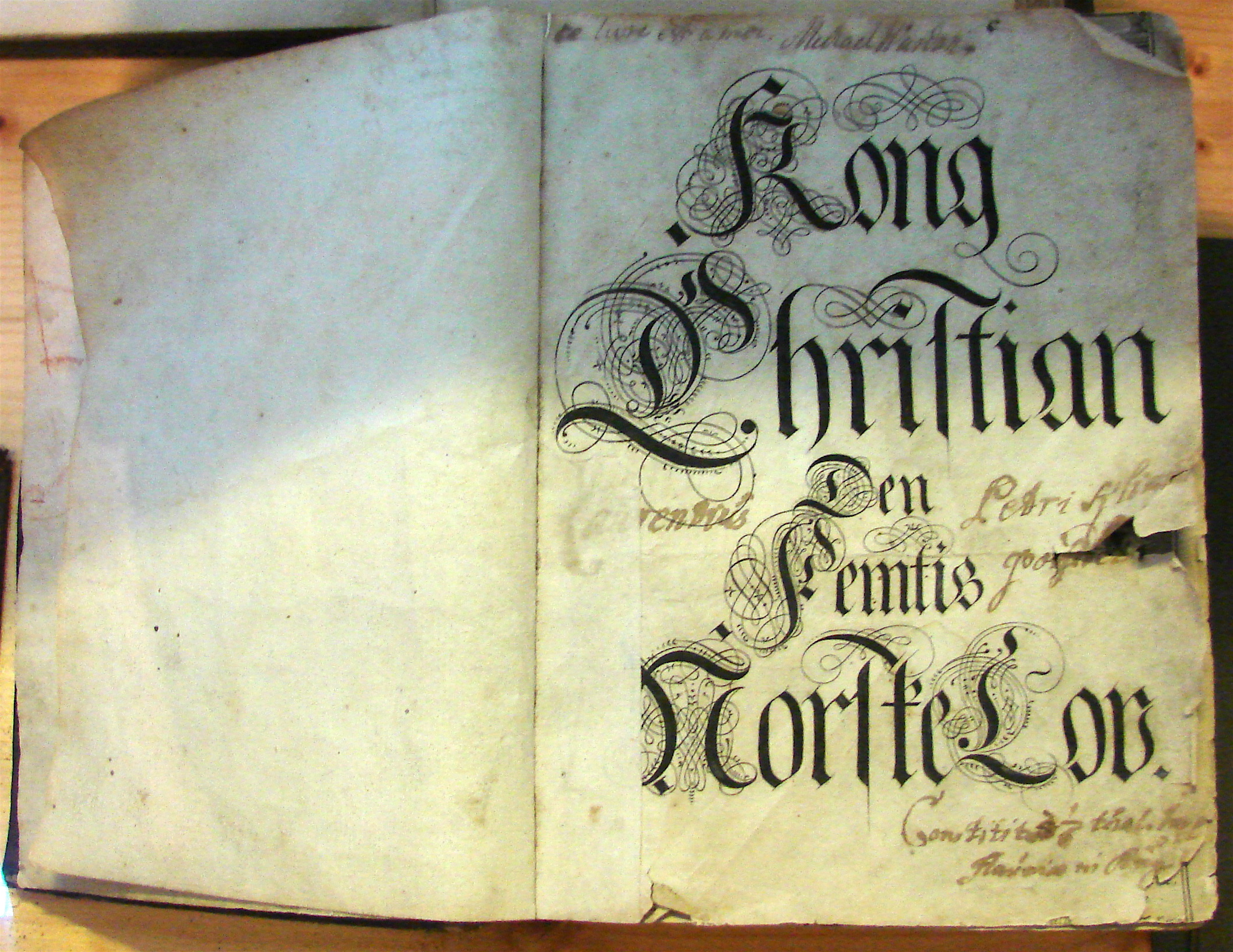
Cristian V's Norwegian Code

- 15 April – Christian V's Norwegian Code was introduced.
  - The "Jew clause" of 1687 was introduced. It banned Jews from entering or staying in Norway without a special royal safe-conduct (leidebrev), carrying a heavy fine of 1,000 riksdaler for violators.

== Deaths ==
- 6 May – Daniel Danielsen Knoff, civil servant and politician (born 1614).
