= Laurids =

Laurids is a Danish name. It can refer to:

- Laurids Lindenov (1640s–1690), Danish nobleman
- Laurids Smith (1754–1794), Danish clergyman
- Jørgen Peder Laurids Jørgensen (1888–1974), Danish politician
- Hans Laurids Sørensen (1901–1974), Danish gymnast

== See also ==
- The Notebooks of Malte Laurids Brigge, 1910 novel by Rainer Maria Rilke
