= 1688 in Norway =

- Centuries: 16th; 17th; 18th; 19th
- Decades: 1660s; 1670s; 1680s; 1690s; 1700s
- See also: 1688 in Denmark; List of years in Norway

Events in the year 1688 in Norway.

== Incumbents ==
- Monarch: Christian V.

== Events ==
- 29 September - The Norwegian Code enters into force.

== Deaths ==
- 6 December – Gert Miltzow, priest and historical writer (born 1629).
