= 1690 in Norway =

- Centuries: 16th; 17th; 18th; 19th
- Decades: 1670s; 1680s; 1690s; 1700s; 1710s
- See also: 1690 in Denmark; List of years in Norway

Events in the year 1690 in Norway.

== Incumbents ==
- Monarch: Christian V.

== Events ==
- 10 October – Shipwreck off Jæren. Among the deaths were Danish nobleman Laurids Lindenov and his wife.

== Births ==
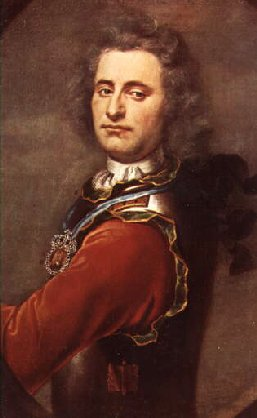
Peter Tordenskjold

- 28 October – Peter Tordenskjold, nobleman and naval flag officer (d.1720).

== Deaths ==
- 10 October – Laurids Lindenov, amtmann of Bergenhus amt (born in the 1640s).
