= Godfred Christensen =

Danish landscape painter (1845–1928)

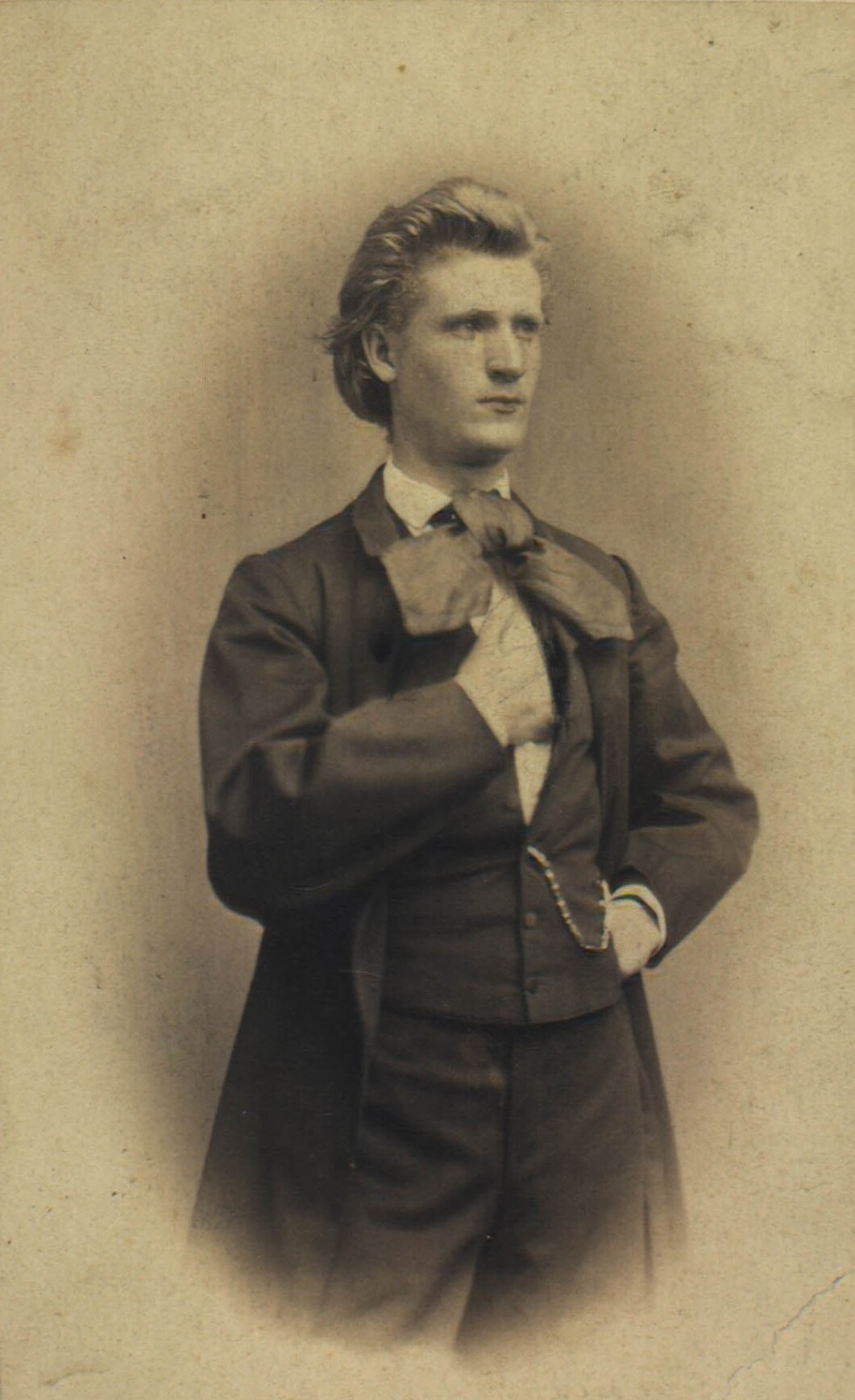
Godfred Christensen

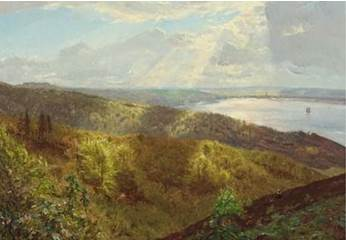
Landscape with View of the Inlet at Vejle (1896)

Polycarpus Godfred Berry Wildenradt Christensen (23 July 1845, Copenhagen - 15 November 1928, Copenhagen) was a Danish landscape painter.

== Biography ==
Christensen was born Copenhagen, the son of Mads Christensen and Anna Kirstine Wissing. After a short time at the Copenhagen Technical College, he enrolled at the Royal Danish Academy of Fine Arts and studied there until 1867. He also took lessons from the landscape painter F.C. Kiærskou and, in 1865, was awarded the Neuhausen Prize (De Neuhausenske Præmier) for his painting A Freestanding Beechwood.

A trip to Paris in 1869 exposed him to the influence of the Barbizon school. Later, he would be regular guest at the Academy of Vilhelm Kyhn.

In 1870, the Academy awarded him the Sødring Prize (Den Sødringske Opmuntringspræmie), established in 1862 by the bequest of Frederik Sødring, (1809–1862) which he used to pursue his studies in North Zealand. The following year, he received the Neuhausen Prize again for one of the paintings he produced there: Landscape with Lush Foreground. This honor resulted in a travel stipend from the Academy that enabled him to visit Germany and Italy, beginning in 1873.

Upon his return in 1875, he held an exhibition of works he had created in Capri and Rome. This was followed by trips to Switzerland and the Pyrenees, where he tried his hand at rendering mountainous landscapes. Later, in Denmark, he would create landscapes and seascapes.

After 1880, he remained in Denmark. In 1881, he became a member of the Academy and, in 1882, married Johanne Louise Sødring (1854-1933), daughter of Christopher Hansen Sødring and Julie Weber Rosenkilde. He became a Titular Professor in 1888 and appointed Knight of the Order of the Dannebrog in 1892.
