= Gimmestad Church =

Church in Vestland, Norway

- Gimmestad kyrkje
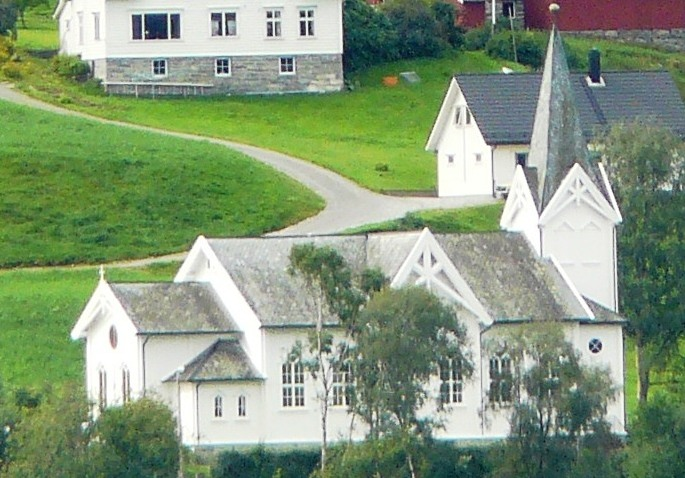
- View of the church
- Gimmestad Church
- 61°46′19″N 6°09′24″E
- Location: Gloppen Municipality, Vestland
- Country: Norway
- Denomination: Church of Norway
- Churchmanship: Evangelical Lutheran

History
- Status: Parish church
- Founded: 1910
- Consecrated: 16 Dec 1910

Architecture
- Functional status: Active
- Architect: Niels Eckhoff
- Architectural type: Long church
- Style: Swiss chalet style
- Completed: 1910 (116 years ago)

Specifications
- Capacity: 315
- Materials: Wood

Administration
- Diocese: Bjørgvin bispedømme
- Deanery: Nordfjord prosti
- Parish: Gloppen
- Norwegian Cultural Heritage Site
- Type: Church
- Status: Not protected
- ID: 223516

Gimmestad Church (Norwegian: Gimmestad kyrkje) is a parish church of the Church of Norway in Gloppen Municipality in Vestland county, Norway. It is located in the village of Sørstranda, right along the shore of the Gloppefjorden. It is one of the four churches for the Gloppen parish which is part of the Nordfjord prosti (deanery) in the Diocese of Bjørgvin. The white, wooden church was built in a long church style in 1910 by the architect Niels Stockfleth Darre Eckhoff. The church seats about 315 people.

== History ==
For centuries, the people of this part of Gloppen attended the Gimmestad Church. By 1880, the old church was deemed to be in poor condition and too small for the parish, seating only about 80 people. After years of discussions, the Church Ministry was in favor of demolition and replacement, but many of the local residents fought for preserving the old church as a museum. The local people prevailed in January 1909 when plans for building a new church were approved. Plans were made for a new church nearby and the old church was to be preserved as a historic site. Niels Stockfleth Darre Eckhoff was hired to draw plans for the new church which would be located on a site about 0.6 kilometres (0.37 mi) west of the old church site. Anders Karlsen from Nordfjordeid was the lead builder for the church. The new building was a wooden long church in a Swiss chalet style. The church has two short extensions on either side of the nave which make the church look more cruciform, but they are just for decoration and the interior is a long church design. There is a church porch with a tower on the west end and the chancel and sacristy are on the east end of the nave. The church was consecrated on 16 December 1910 by Bishop Johan Willoch Erichsen.

== Media gallery ==
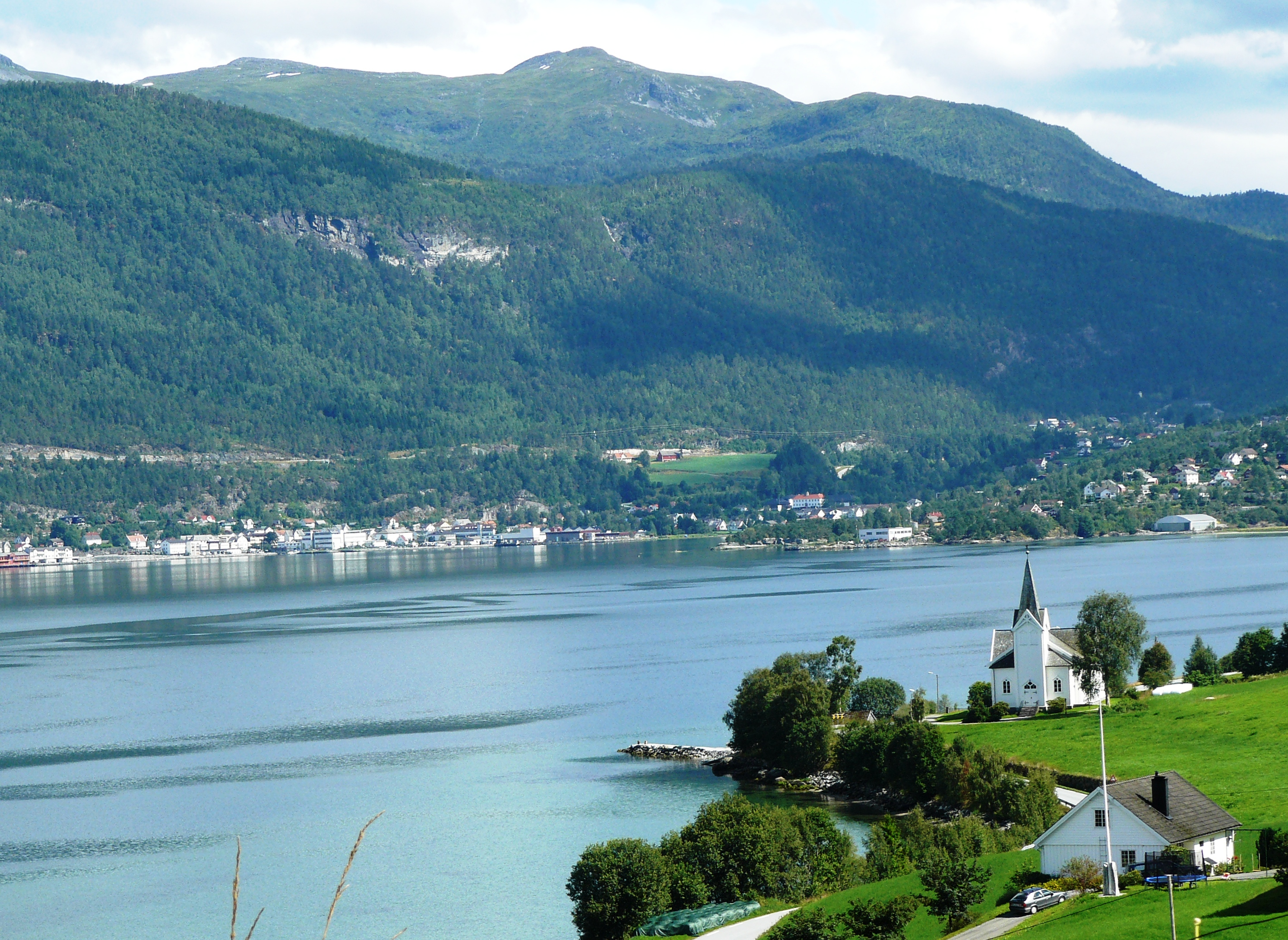

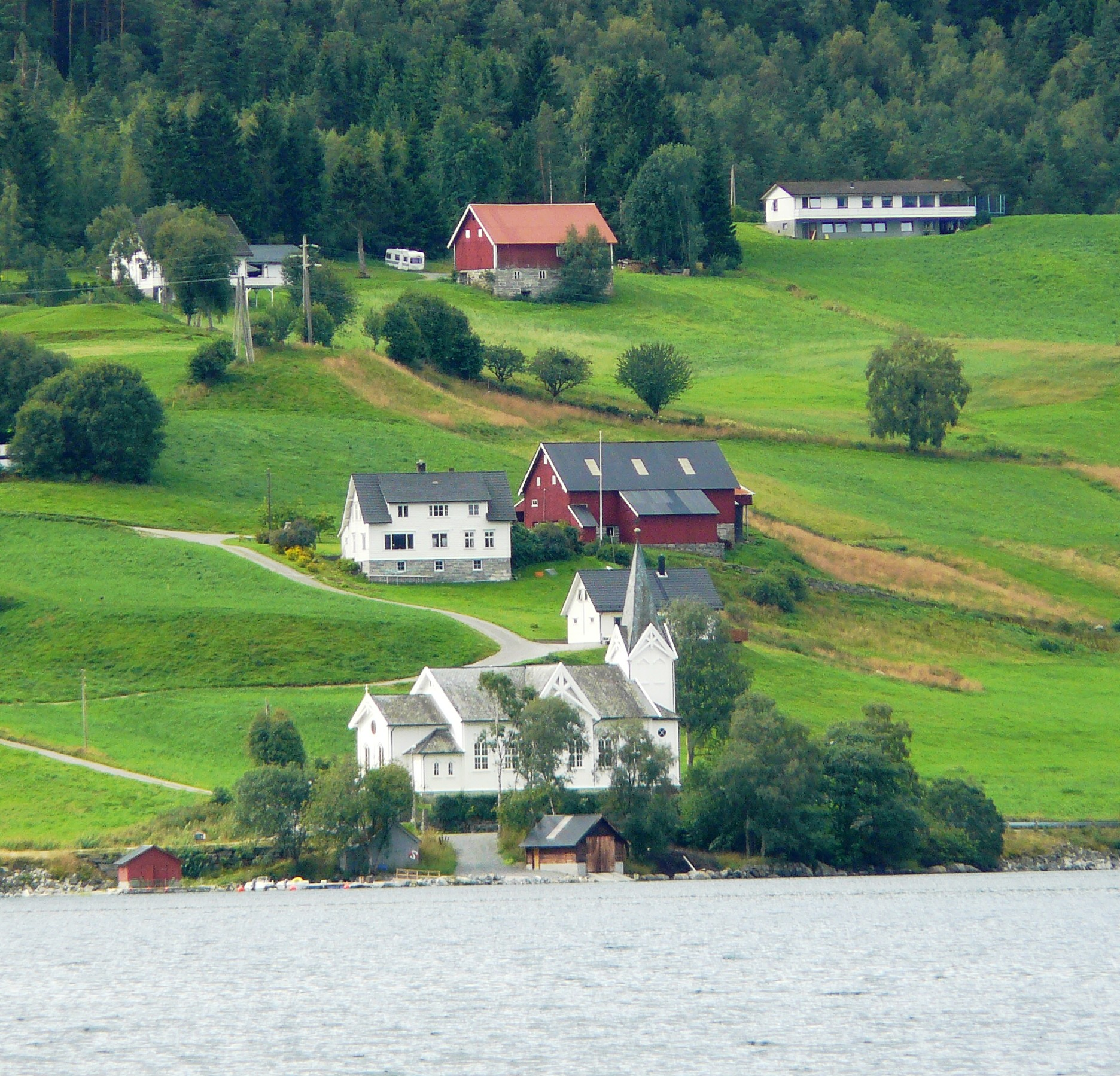

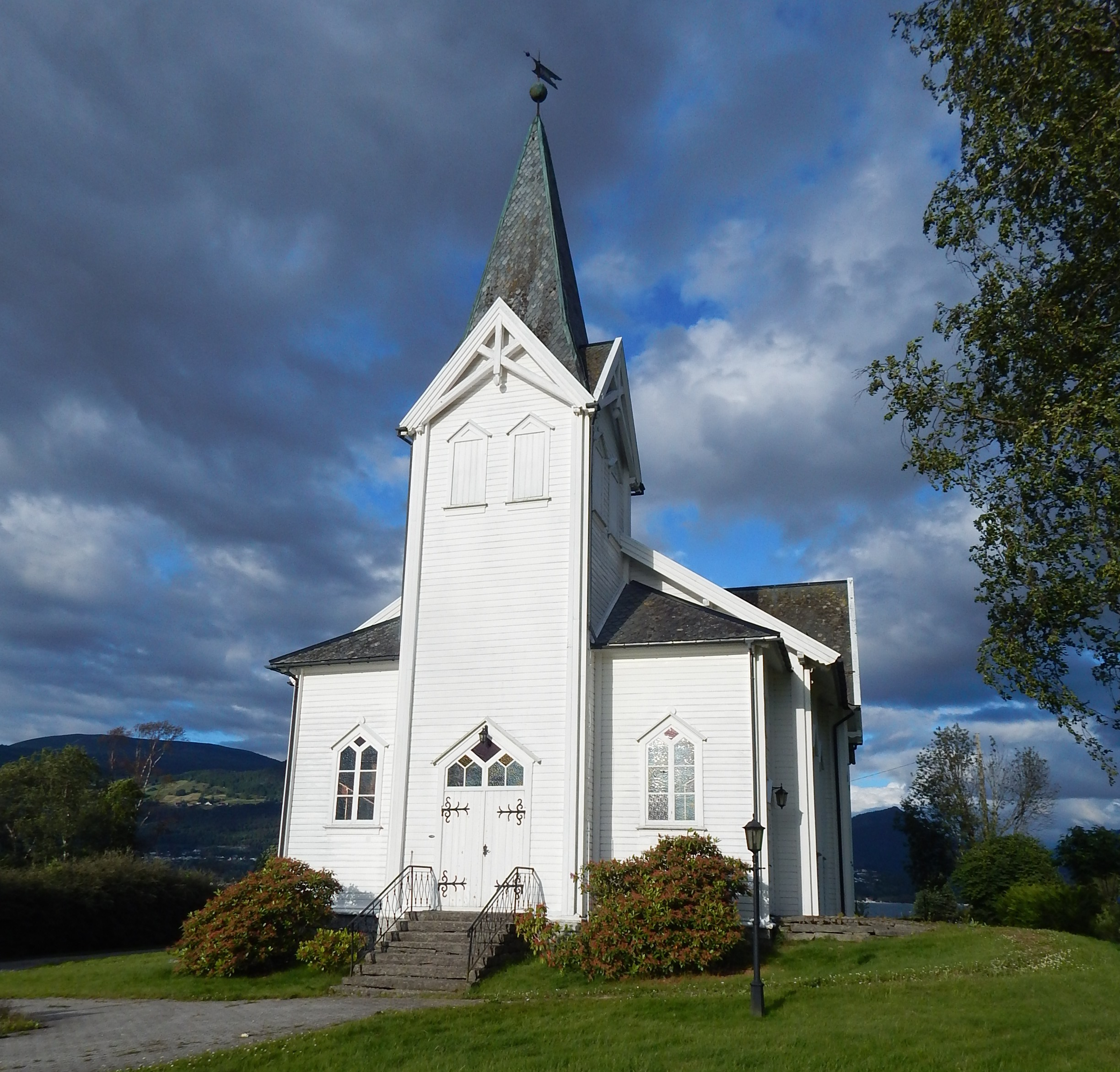

== See also ==
- List of churches in Bjørgvin
