= 1685 in Norway =

- Centuries: 16th; 17th; 18th; 19th
- Decades: 1660s; 1670s; 1680s; 1690s; 1700s
- See also: 1685 in Denmark; List of years in Norway

Events in the year 1685 in Norway.

== Incumbents ==
- Monarch: Christian V.

== Events ==
- The construction of Kristiansten Fortress was finished.
- The construction of the Old Town Bridge in Trondheim was finished.

== Arts and literature ==
- Dorothe Engelbretsdatter hymn and poetry book, Taare-Offer is published for the first time.

== Births ==
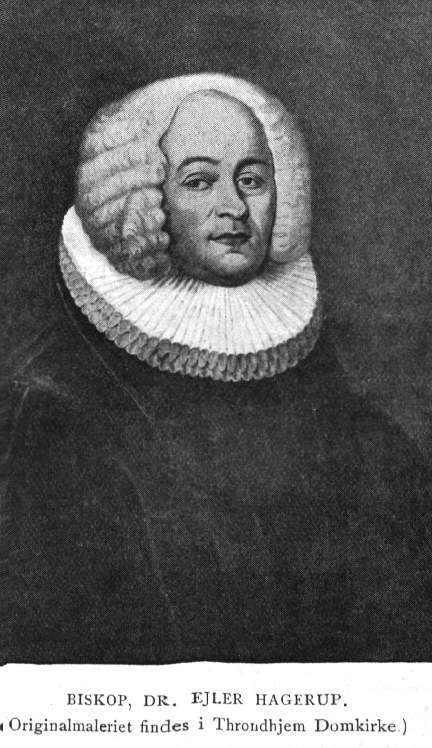
Eiler Hagerup

- 25 November – Eiler Hagerup d.e., bishop (died 1743).

== Deaths ==
- 23 August – Ludvig Rosenkrantz, nobleman and civil servant, the first baron in Norway (born 1628).
