= Frederik Harboe =

Danish naval officer

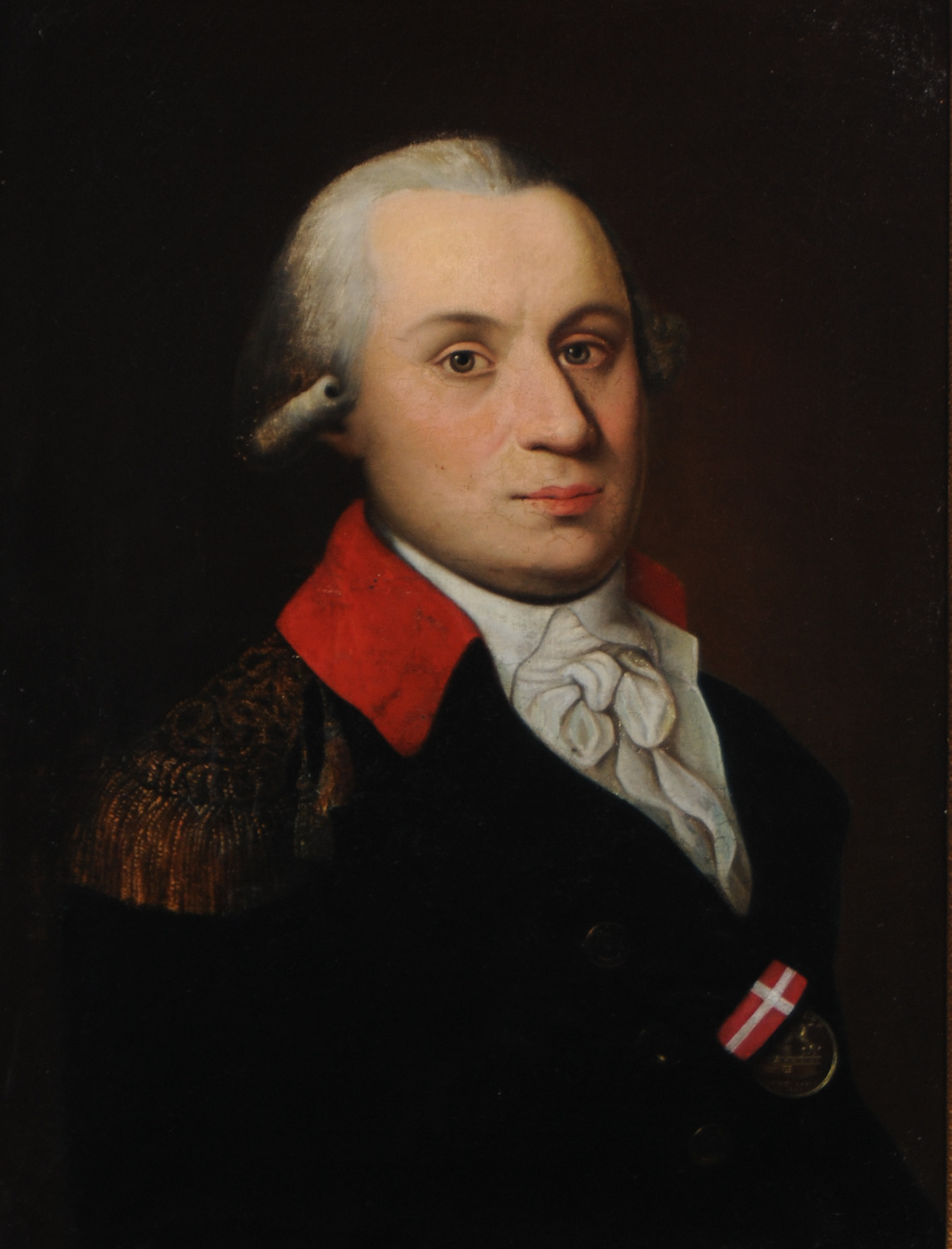
Frederik Harboe painted by Hens Juel.

Frederik Carl Ludvig Harboe (21 January 1758 – 29 September 1811) was a Danish naval officer who reached the rank of commodore in the Royal Dano-Norwegian Navy. He was the father of painter Eleonore Christine Harboe.

== Early life and background ==
Harboe was born on 21 January 1648 in Gamburg, the son of Frederik Carl Harboe (1716–1768) and Christiane Magdalene Jacobi (1732–1804). His father headed the city's Danish post office. His paternal uncle was bishop Ludvig Harboe.

== Career ==
Harboe became a cadet in 1771, a junior lieutenant in 1777, senior lieutenant 1785, captain lieutenant in 1789 and kaptajn 1797. He destinguished himself in the Battle of Copenhagen on 2 April 1801. In 1798, he was promoted to commander captain.
