= 1691 in Norway =

- Centuries: 16th; 17th; 18th; 19th
- Decades: 1670s; 1680s; 1690s; 1700s; 1710s
- See also: 1691 in Denmark; List of years in Norway

Events in the year 1691 in Norway.

== Incumbents ==
- Monarch: Christian V.

== Events ==
- The Åmdal copperwork is established.

== Births ==
- 17 July – Peder von Todderud, Army general and landowner (d. 1772).
