= 1686 in Norway =

- Centuries: 17th; 18th; 19th
- Decades: 1660s; 1670s; 1680s; 1690s; 1700s
- See also: 1686 in Denmark; List of years in Norway

Events in the year 1686 in Norway.

== Incumbents ==
- Monarch: Christian V.

== Events ==
- The Cathedral Hellig Trefoldigheds Kirke in Christiania burned down (completed in 1639).
- The first Chief of police is hired in Trondheim.
- The Royal Norwegian Mint is founded in Kongsberg.

== Births ==
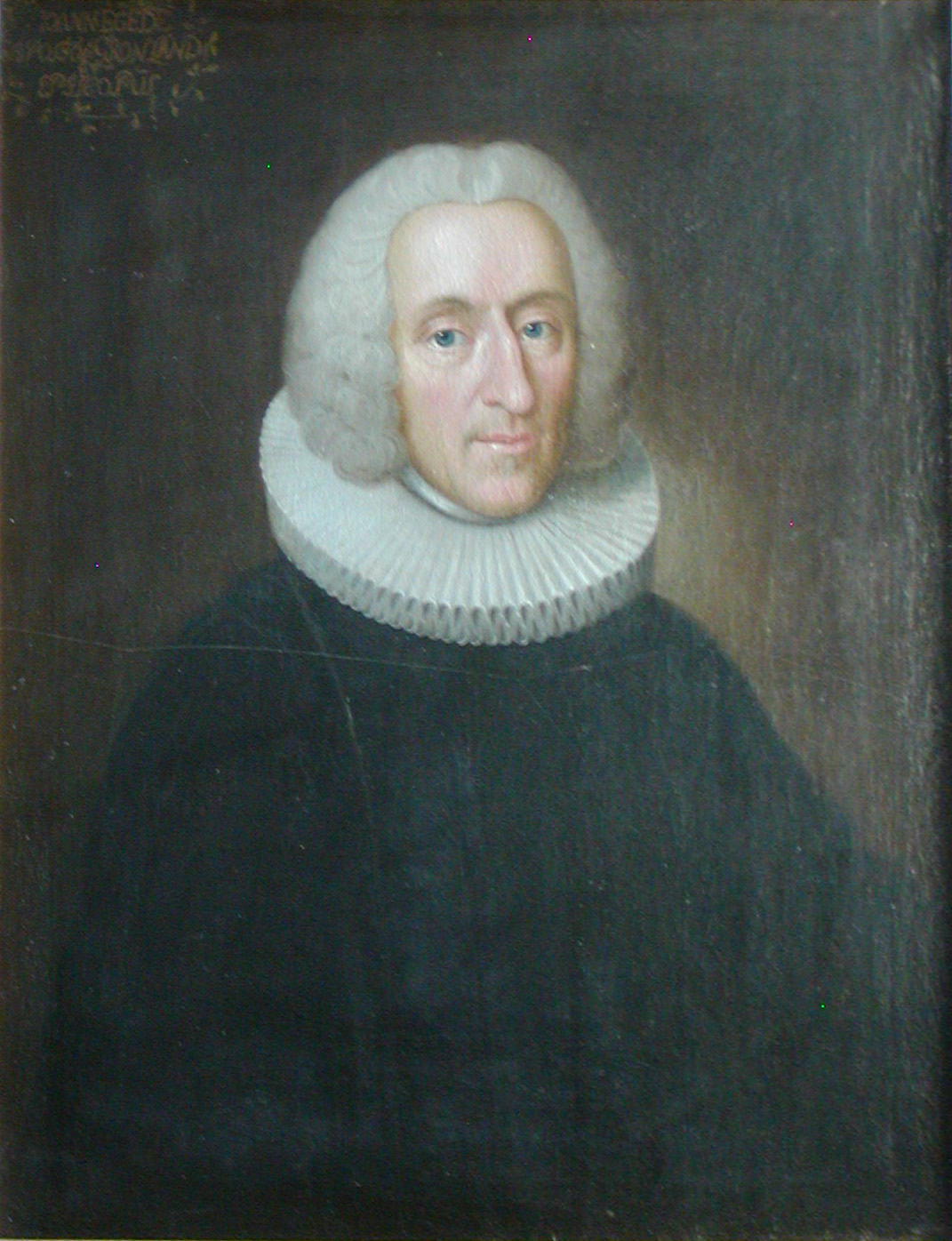
Hans Egede

- 31 January - Hans Egede, Lutheran missionary (d.1758)

== Deaths ==
=== Exact date missing ===
- Christen Nielsen Holberg, army officer (born c. 1625)
