= 1684 in Norway =

- Centuries: 16th; 17th; 18th; 19th
- Decades: 1660s; 1670s; 1680s; 1690s; 1700s
- See also: 1684 in Denmark; List of years in Norway

Events in the year 1684 in Norway.

== Incumbents ==
- Monarch: Christian V.

== Events ==
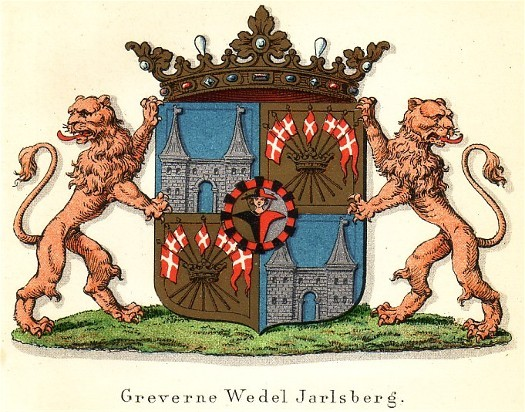
Coat of Arms of the Counts of Wedel-Jarlsberg

- HDMS Lossen is launched.
- Gustav Wilhelm von Wedel received the title of Count of Wedel-Jarlsberg.

== Births ==
- 3 January – Jürgen Christoph von Koppelow, nobleman and officer (d. 1770)
- 3 December (Julian calendar) – Ludvig Holberg, philosopher, historian, essayist and playwright (d. 1754).
