= 1689 in Norway =

- Centuries: 16th; 17th; 18th; 19th
- Decades: 1660s; 1670s; 1680s; 1690s; 1700s
- See also: 1689 in Denmark; List of years in Norway

Events in the year 1689 in Norway.

== Incumbents ==
- Monarch: Christian V.

== Events ==
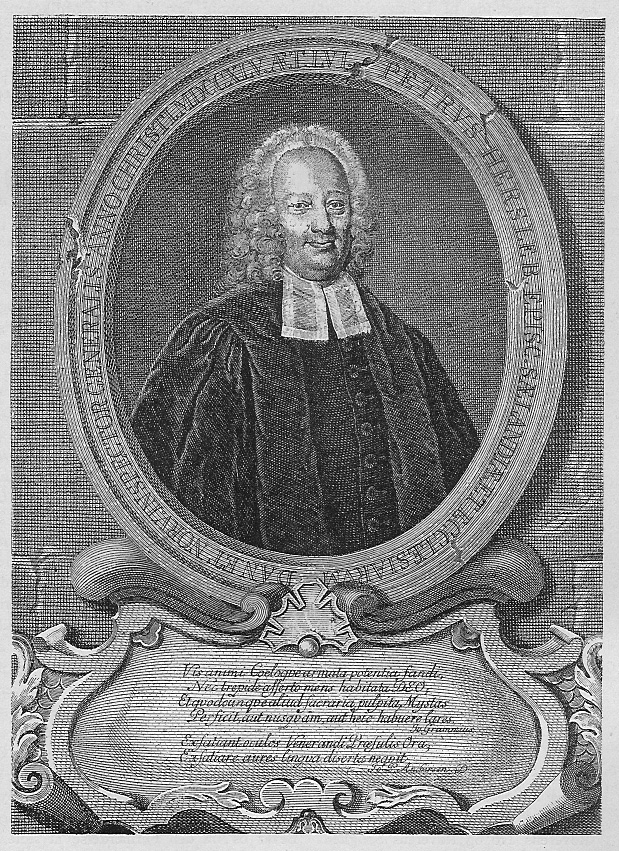
Peder Hersleb, Bishop of the Diocese of Oslo from 1731 to 1737.

== Births ==
- 25 March – Peder Hersleb, bishop (d.1757).
