= Old Gimmestad Church =

Church in Vestland, Norway

- Gimmestad gamle kyrkje
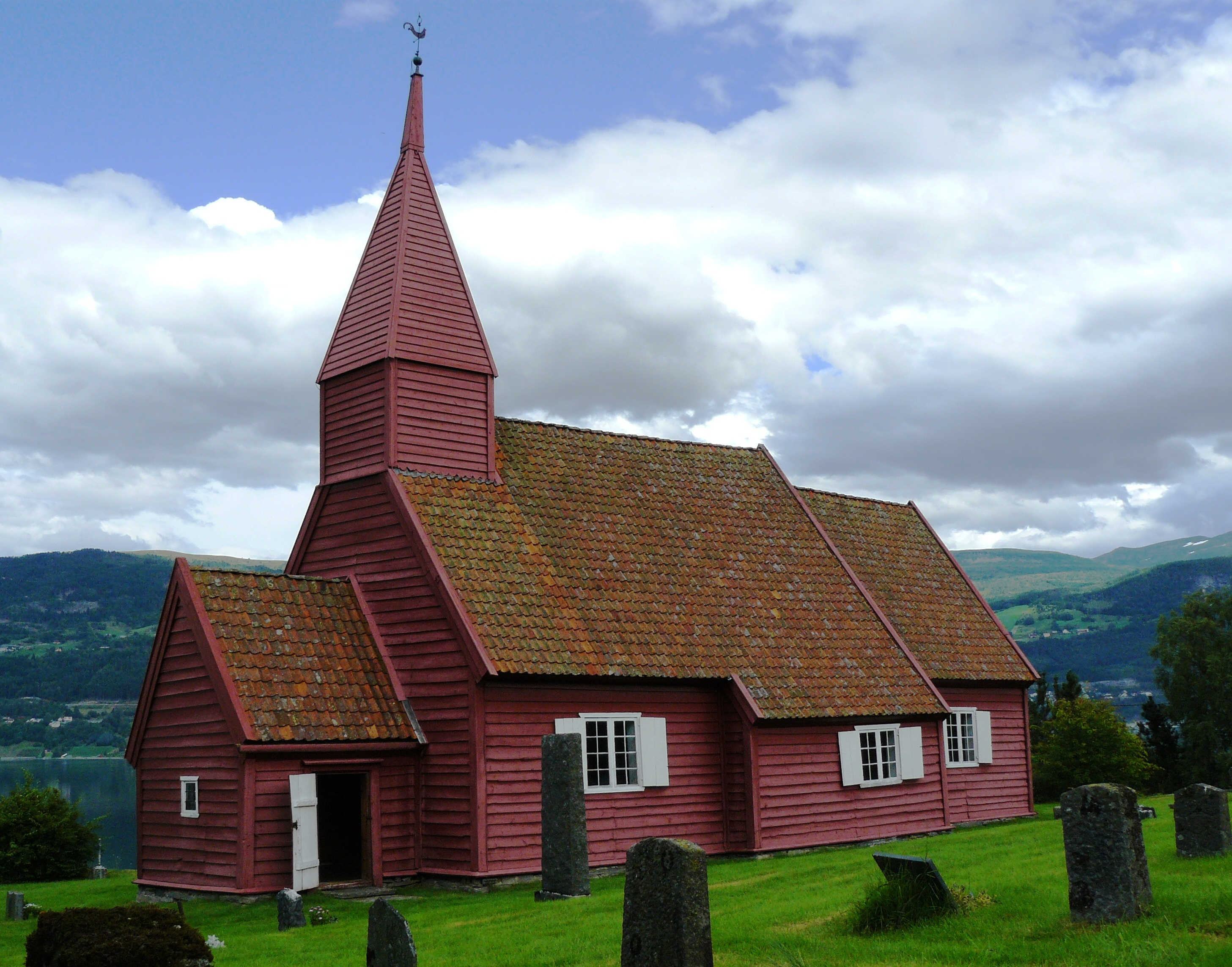
- View of the church
- Old Gimmestad Church
- 61°46′20″N 6°08′38″E
- Location: Gloppen Municipality, Vestland
- Country: Norway
- Denomination: Church of Norway
- Previous denomination: Catholic Church
- Churchmanship: Evangelical Lutheran

History
- Status: Parish church
- Founded: 13th century
- Consecrated: 1692

Architecture
- Functional status: Active
- Architectural type: Long church
- Completed: 1692 (334 years ago)

Specifications
- Capacity: 80
- Materials: Wood

Administration
- Diocese: Bjørgvin bispedømme
- Deanery: Nordfjord prosti
- Parish: Gloppen
- Norwegian Cultural Heritage Site
- Type: Church
- Status: Automatically protected
- ID: 84240

Old Gimmestad Church (Norwegian: Gimmestad gamle kyrkje) is a former parish church of the Church of Norway in Gloppen Municipality in Vestland county, Norway. It is located in the village of Sørstranda. Previously, it served as the church for the Gimmestad parish, which is part of the Nordfjord prosti (deanery) in the Diocese of Bjørgvin, but now it primarily functions as a museum. The red, wooden church was built in a long church style in 1692, with the architect remaining unknown. The church has a seating capacity of approximately 80 people.

The church was in regular use until 1910 when the new Gimmestad Church was completed. Since 1910, the church has been preserved as a historic site and is occasionally used for religious services or weddings.

== History ==
The earliest existing historical records of the church date back to 1308, but it was not a new church at that time. The first church in Gimmestad was a wooden stave church. In 1650, the old church was in such poor condition that it was decided to demolish the old building and construct a new church on the same site. So, in 1652, the old church was torn down and a new timber-framed building was erected. Unfortunately, the new building was not of high quality building, and in December 1690, the church suffered significant damage during a winter storm, with strong winds severely damaging the building. In 1692, the church was demolished and replaced with a new building on the same site.

The 1692 building still stands today, representative of typical Norwegian church architecture from the period after the Reformation. Although changes were made to its walls, the church has retained most of its original features. The most significant change occurred around 1720, when the church was painted red and embellished with flower motifs. During that same renovation project, the ceiling was painted blue, and stars were drawn on it. At the back of the church building is a christening house or front house, where babies were christened in the old days. It was customary to carry the baby from this room to the altar.

By the early 1900s, the church was too small for the congregation, and many in the parish chose to attend the larger Vereide Church on the other side of the fjord. In 1902, the Church Ministry decided that the church should be torn down and replaced, but due to local opposition, the church was preserved as a museum and a new church was to be built nearby. In 1910, the new Gimmestad Church was built about 0.6 kilometres (0.37 mi) to the east, closer to the fjord. After the new church was completed in 1910, it became the main church for the parish and the old church was taken out of regular use. It is now used mostly as a museum, but on special occasions it is still used as a church. In 1914–1915, the old church was restored according to plans by Kristen Rivertz. In the 1960s, the church was restored again according to plans by Egill Reimers, and Bjørn Kaland restored the interior painting and decorations on the walls and ceiling.

== Media gallery ==
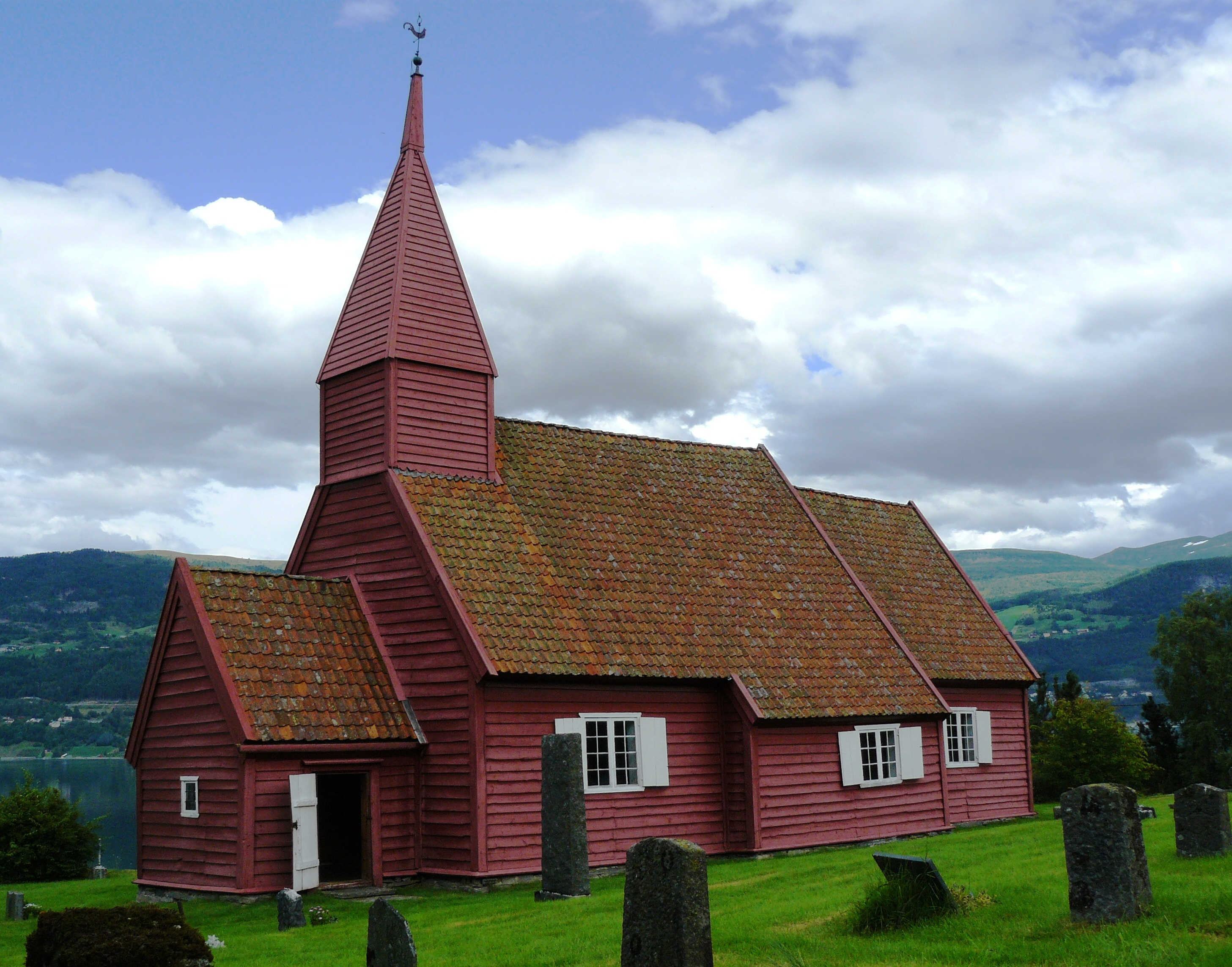

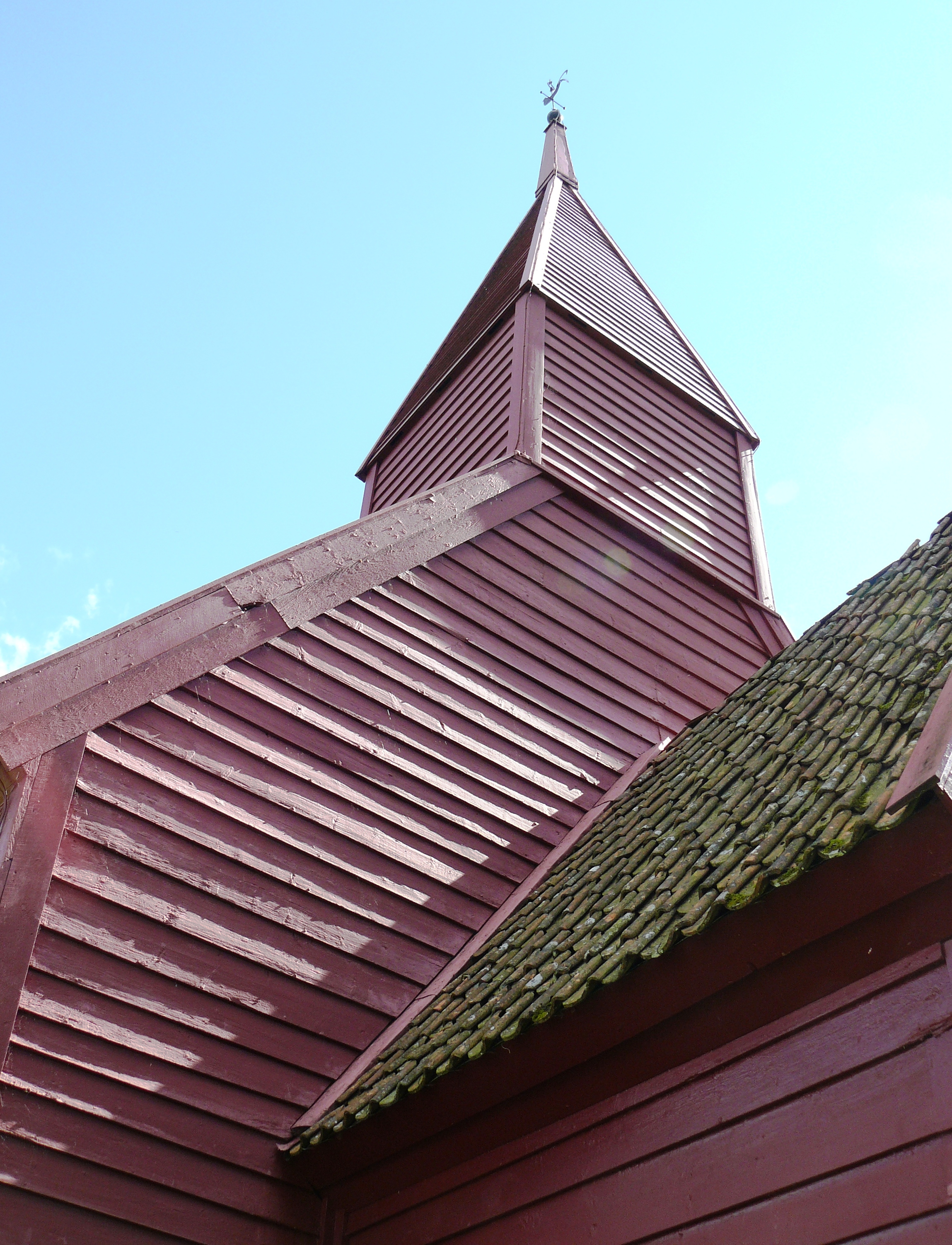

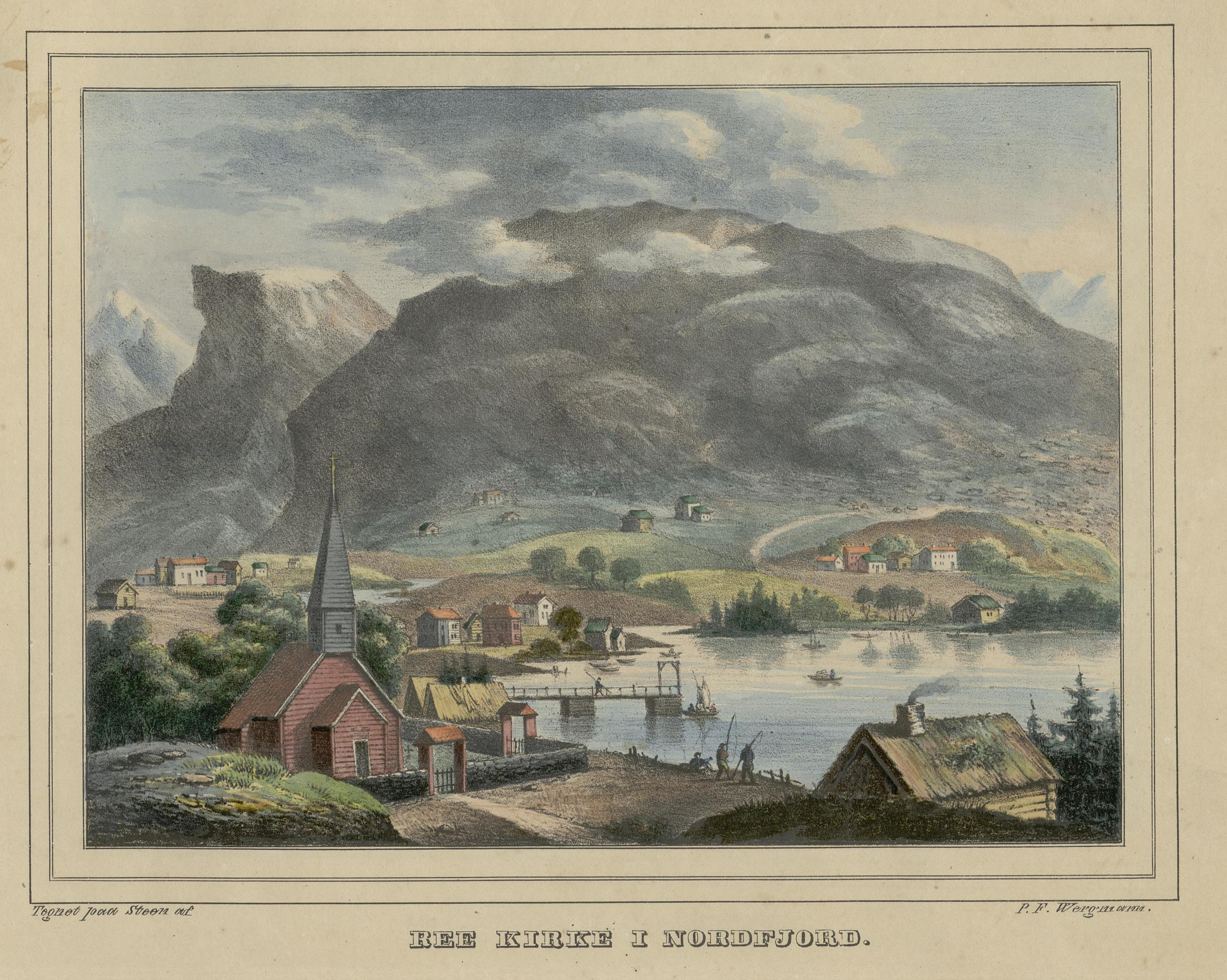

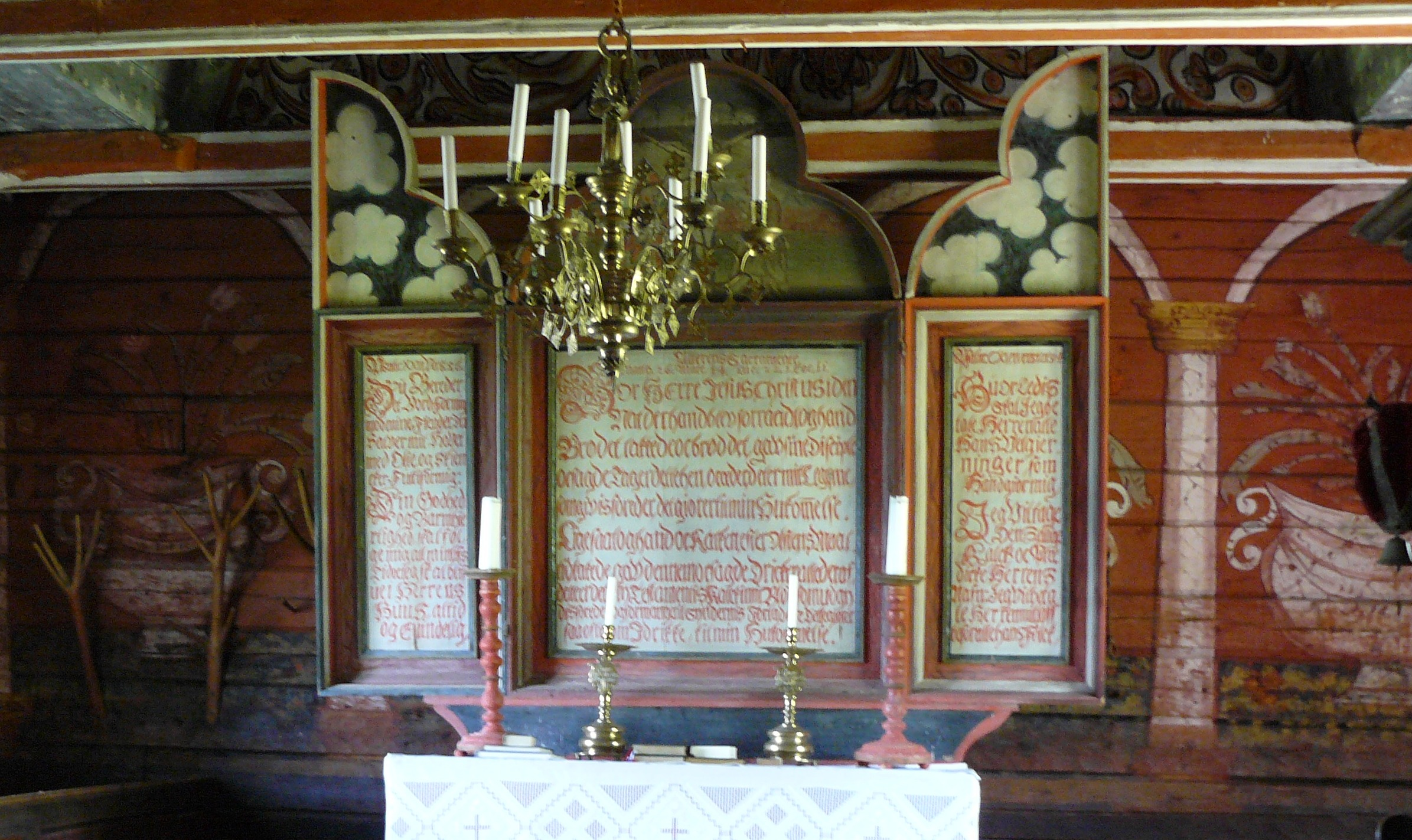
The altarpiece of the Old Gimmestad Church

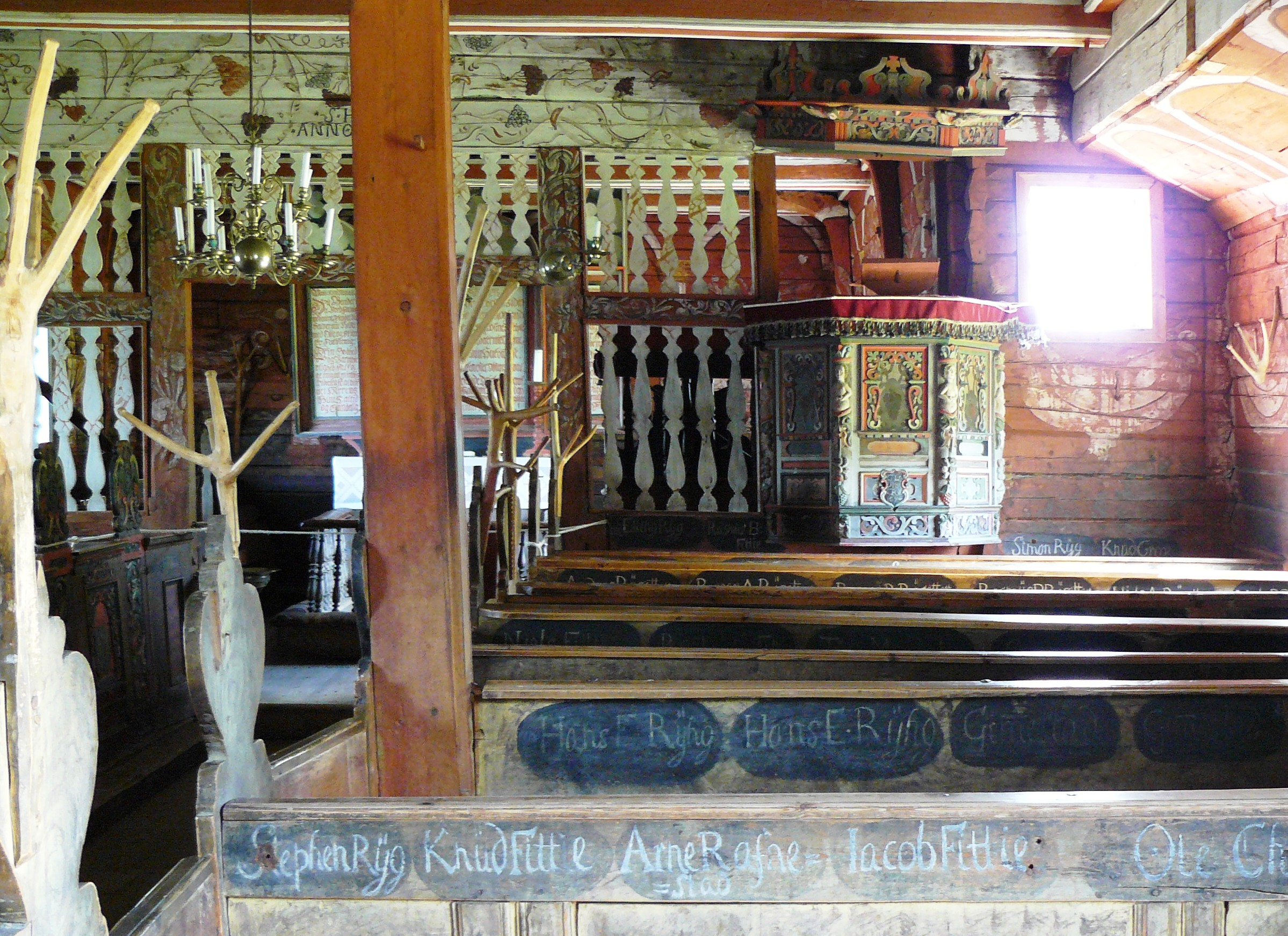
The unique personalized benches in the Old Gimmestad Church

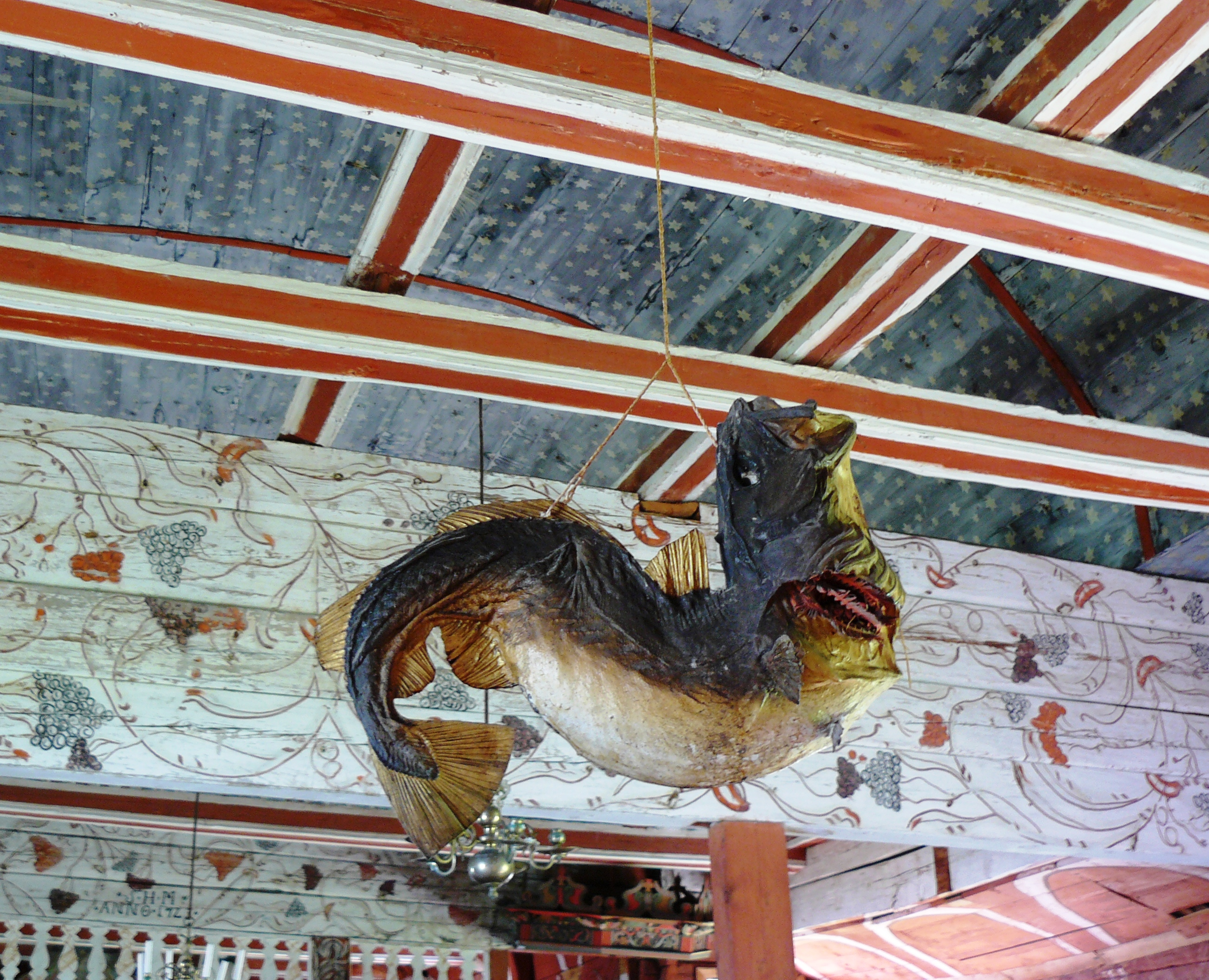
A cod in the church, symbolizing Jonah and the whale

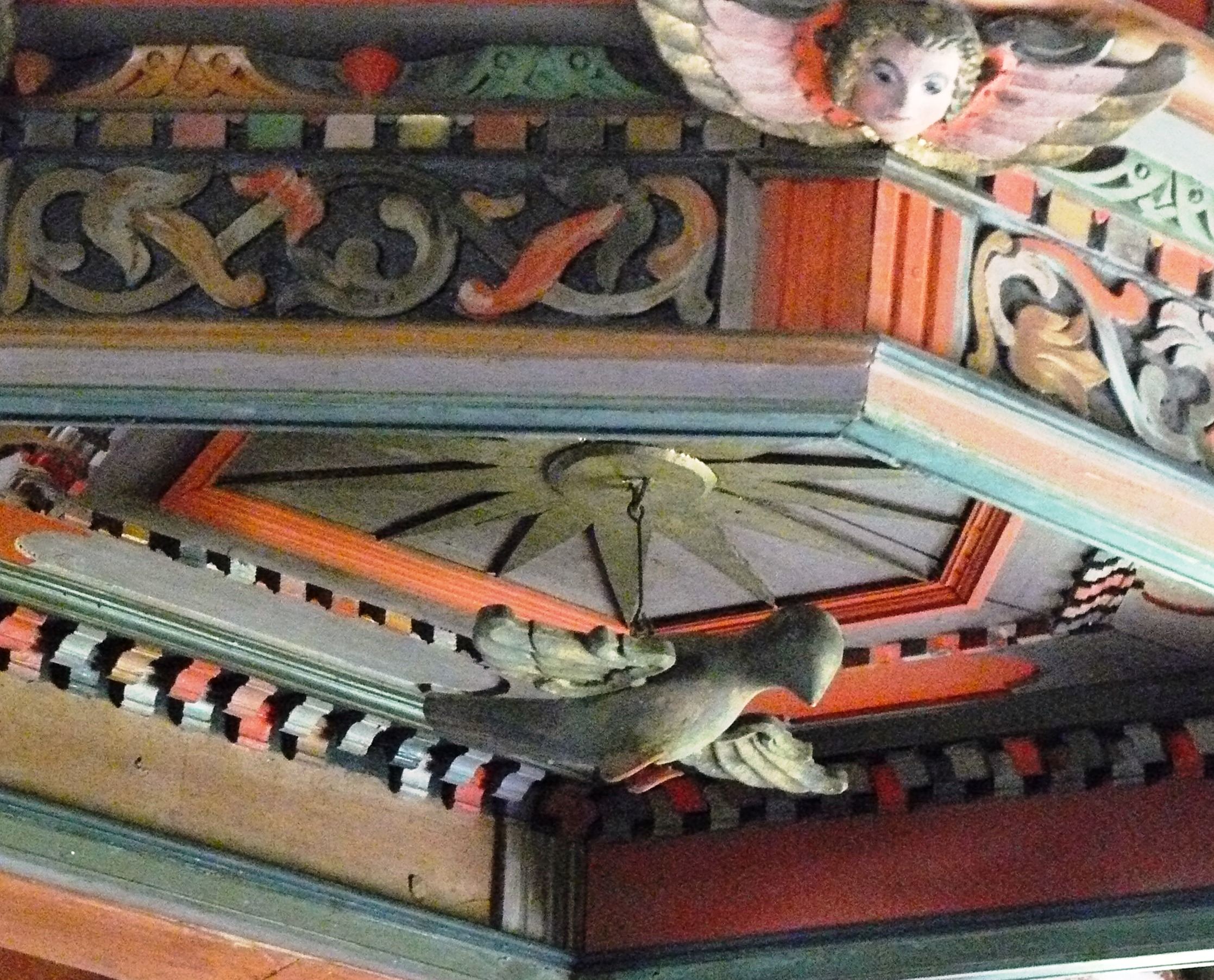

== See also ==
- List of churches in Bjørgvin
