= Laurids Lindenov =

Laurids Lindenov (1640s – 10 October 1690) was a Danish nobleman and civil servant in Norway.

He was probably born at Funen, Denmark. He was the a son of landowner Henrik Ottesen Lindenov (1602-1673) and Beate Christoffersdatter Ulfeldt (1610-1676). The traditional education of a young nobleman included a lengthy study at universities throughout Europe. After he returned to Denmark, he served at the Court of Christian V, with the title of hoffjunker, and as chamberlain for Duchess Frederica Amalia of Holstein-Gottorp. During the Scanian War against Sweden in 1676, Lindenov war commissioner in Skåne.

Lindenov came to Norway in 1681 where served as acting governor (amtmann) of Bergenhus amt in Norway. During a travel in 1690 his ship wrecked near Sola in Jæren off the coast of Rogaland, where both Lindenov and his wife perished.

Government offices
New office	County Governor of Bergenhus amt 1681–1690	Succeeded by Hans Nielsen
