= Norwegian Code =

Section of Norwegian law from the 17th century

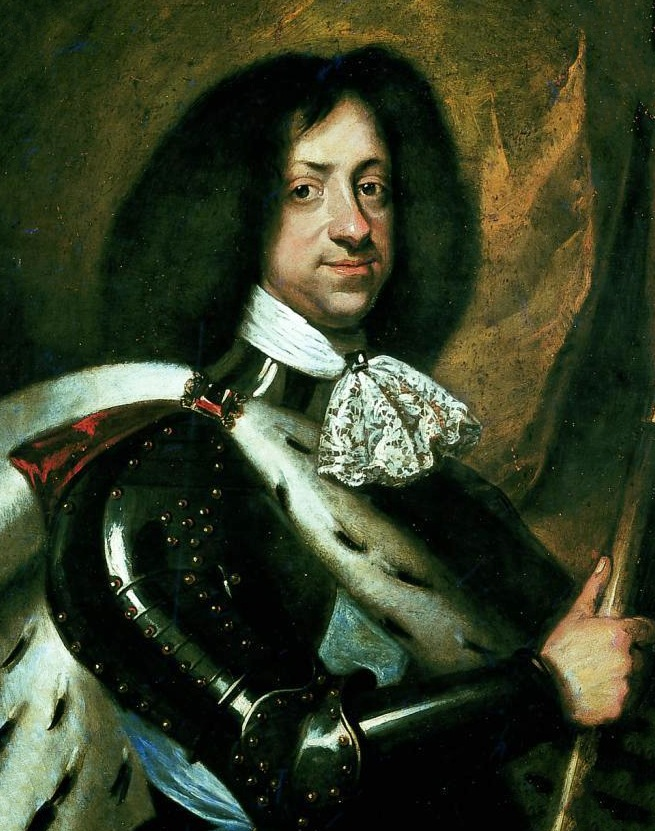
Christian V of Denmark and Norway, during whose reign, the compilation of the Norwegian code was finalized.

The Norwegian Code (Norwegian: Norske Lov, abbreviated NL) is the oldest part of the Norwegian law still in force, partially in force in Norway, Iceland, and the Faroe Islands.

It was compiled and completed during the reign of Christian V of (Denmark and) Norway on 15 April 1687 and entered into force on 29 September 1688, as the legal code for the Kingdom of Norway including its dependencies (the Faroe Islands, Iceland, and Greenland). Norway was a nominally sovereign kingdom, but politically (although not economically) the weaker part in a personal union with Denmark at the time.

The Norwegian Code was largely based on the Danish Code (Danske Lov, DL), promulgated in 1683 and itself mostly based on older Danish laws, but the Norwegian Code had some differences from the Danish Code in some areas, such as inheritance law, agricultural law, law relating to hunting, fisheries and trade, and military issues.

In the 19th and 20th centuries, most of the provisions were gradually repealed as they were replaced by modern laws. The code as such remains in force, and it was last amended on 1 January 1993. As late as the postwar era, the Supreme Courts of Denmark and Norway interpreted identical provisions from the Danish and Norwegian Code respectively; they came to the opposite conclusions regarding the meaning of identical provisions NL 6-10-2 (in force in Norway until 1985) and DL 6-10-2 (still in force in Denmark). The provision is ambiguously worded and regulates compensation for damage caused by livestock and dogs. The Supreme Court of Norway ruled on the meaning of this provision in 1954.

Norway's new Criminal Code entered into force in 1842, but crimes committed before that year were punished under the Norwegian Code. The Norwegian Code was last applied in a criminal case in August 1862, when 80 year-old Lorentse Thomasdatter Vaagen admitted to having robbed and killed her friend Gunnil Heggelund in Trondhjem in 1827. She was sentenced to death, but the sentence was commuted to life imprisonment, and she died in the same year.

Parts of the Norwegian Code also remain in force in the former Norwegian dependencies Iceland and the Faroe Islands, which became part of Denmark with the dissolution of the Dano-Norwegian union in 1814. Iceland is today a sovereign state, while the Faroe Islands is a self-governing Danish dependency.

== Background ==
It is also referred to as Christian V's Norwegian Code, to distinguish it from its predecessor, Christian IV's Norwegian Code, in force from 1604 to 1688. Christian IV's Norwegian Code was largely a translation into Danish of Magnus VI's Norwegian Code, promulgated in 1274 as a unified code of laws to apply for the whole country, including the Faroe Islands and Shetland, and replacing earlier regional laws.
