= 1732 in Denmark =

- Decades: 1710s; 1720s; 1730s; 1740s; 1750s
- See also: Other events of 1732; List of years in Denmark

Events from the year 1732 in Denmark.

== Incumbents ==
- Monarch – Christian VI
- Prime minister – Iver Rosenkrantz

== Events ==
January

- 27 June – Cron Printz Christian arrives back in Copenhagen from the first Danish expedition to Canton with a valuable cargo of tea, silk and other Chinese products.

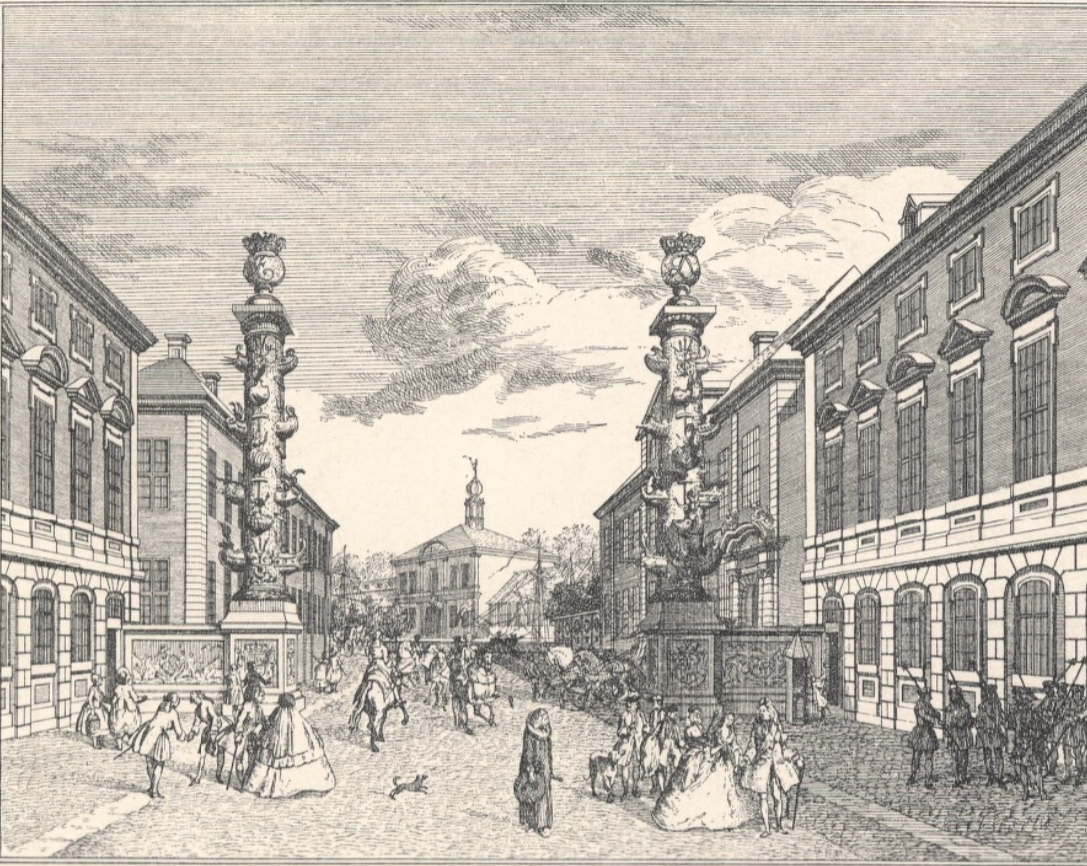
Honorary columns installed by Admiralitetet in Størregade in Copenhagen in connection with the celebration of the wedding of Crown Prince Frederik and Princess Louise

December

- 11 December – Crown Prince Frederik and Princess Louise are received in Copenhagen and the wedding ceremony is repeated.

=== Undated ===
- The County of Løvenholm is established by Frederik Christian Danneskiold-Samsøe from the manors of af Løvenholm, Demstrup and Sødringholm.

== Births ==
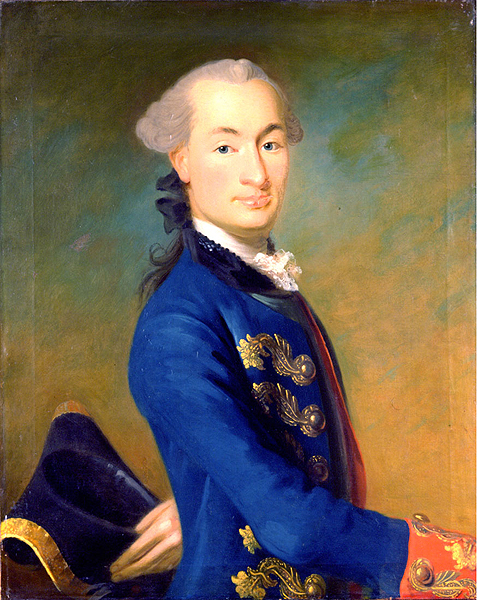
Peter Schiønning.

- 17 January – Daniel Adzer, medallist (died 1808)
- 15 August – Peter Schiønning, naval officer (died 1813)
- 1 October – Jørgen Balthazar Winterfeldt, naval officer and philanthropist (died 1821)

=== Full date missing ===
- Johanne Seizberg, illustrator and teacher (died 1772)

== Deaths ==
- 26 August – Hans Nobel, landowner and civil servant (born 1657)
