= HDMS Justitia =

HDMS Justitia is the name of the following ships of the Royal Danish Navy:

- HDMS Justitia (1707), a ship of the line decommissioned in 1751
- HDMS Justitia (1777), a 72-gun ship of the line captured by the Royal Navy in 1807 at the Battle of Copenhagen, became HMS Justitia

== See also ==
- HMS Justitia
- Justitia (disambiguation)
