= Gustmeyer =

Gustmeyer is a surname. Notable people with the surname include:

- Carl Hieronimus Gustmeyer (1701–1756), Danish merchant
- Catarina Gustmeyer (1710–1773), Danish businessperson, wife of Carl
