= 1813 in Denmark =

- Decades: 1790s; 1800s; 1810s; 1820s; 1830s
- See also: Other events of 1813; List of years in Denmark

Events from the year 1813 in Denmark.

== Incumbents ==
- Monarch – Frederick VI
- Prime minister – Frederik Moltke

== Events ==
- 5 January - The heavy financial and economic burden of the Gunboat War with England takes its monetary toll: Denmark-Norway defaults on its foreign debt (Danish state bankruptcy of 1813).
- 7 December – Battle of Bornhöved, part of the War of the Sixth Coalition, is fought Danish troops and Swedish cavalry at the small village of Bornhöft in the Duchy of Schleswig and results in Swedish victory.
- 10 December – The Battle of Sehested is fought between Danish and Swedish (with Prussian-Russian battalions) troops at Sehested in Holstein and results in Danish victory.

== Births ==
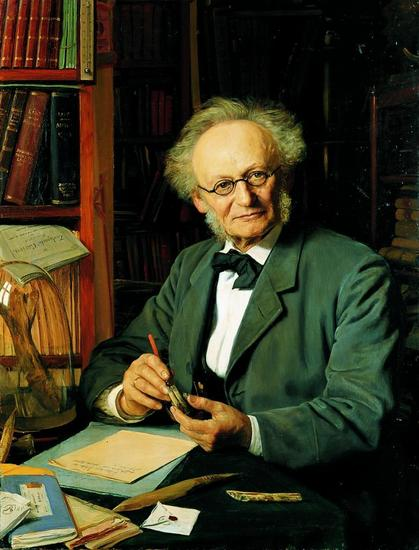
Johannes Steenstrup.

=== January–March ===
- 11 January – Frederik Marcus Knuth, landowner, civil servant and politician (born 1856)
- 3 February – Andreas Flinch, goldsmith, wood-engraver and lithographer (d. 1872)
- 8 March – Johannes Steenstrup, natural scientist (d. 1897)

=== April–June ===
- 4 April – Marie Toft, landowner (d. 1854)
- 5 May – Søren Kierkegaard, theologian, philosopher, poet, social critic, and religious author (d. 1855)
- 20 June – Frederik Wilhelm Dannemand, military officer and landowner (died 1888)
- 28 June – Johan Carl Christian Petersen, seaman, expedition member, interpretor (died 1880)

=== July–September ===
- 13 July – Theophil Hansen, architect who later became an Austrian citizen (d. 1891 in Austria)

=== October–December ===
- 22 October – Mozart Waagepetersen, businessman (born 1885)
- 10 October – Frederik Liebmann, botanist (died1856)
- 29 October – Carl Ploug, writer (died 1894)

== Deaths ==
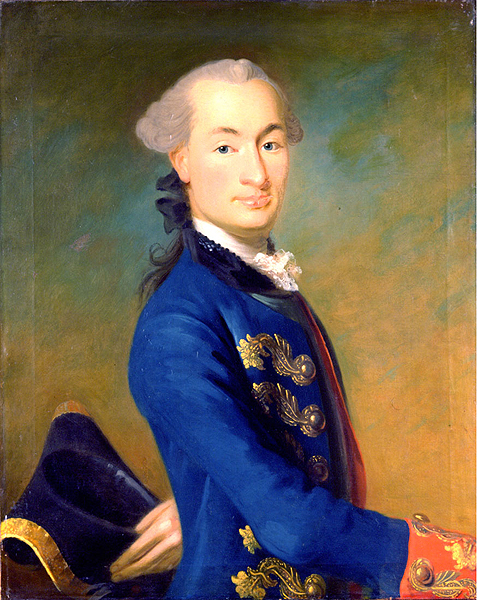
Peter Schiønning.

- 9 March – Carl Frederik Stanley, sculptor (b. c. 1738)
- 29 July – Jens Jensen Berg, sea captain and businessman (born 1760)
- 7 August – Peter Schiønning, naval officer (born 1732)
- 30 August – David Amsel Meyer, businessman and financial advisor (born 1755)
