= HDMS Hvide Ørn (1753) =

Frigate of the Royal Dano-Norwegian Navy

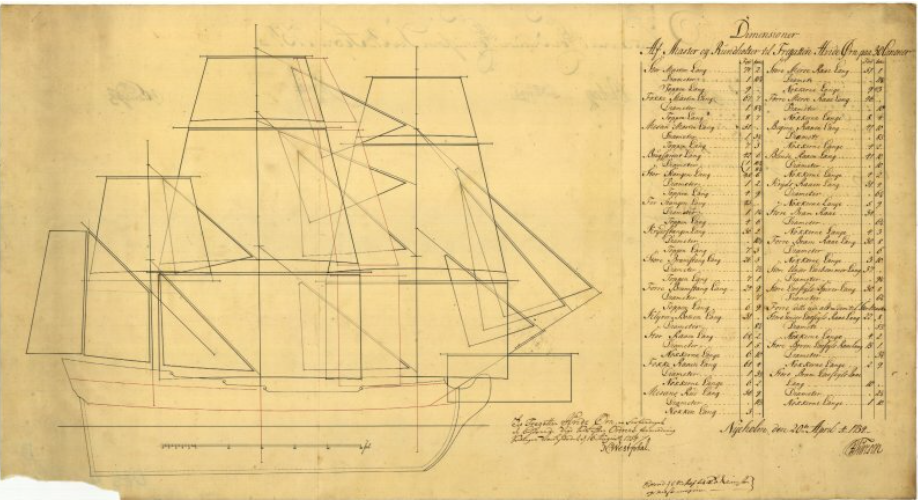
Tendering for the ship.

HDMS Hvide Ørn was a frigate of the Royal Dano-Norwegian Navy, which she served from 1754 to 1776. She was launched on 24 November 1753.

== Construction and design ==
HDMS Hvide Ørn was constructed at Nyholm Dockyard under the directions of master ship builder Andreas Thuresen. She was laid down on 23 March 1753 and launched on 24 November 1753. She was named for Peter Tordenskjold's famous frigate by the same name.

Her complement was approximately 224 men. Her armament was 30 × 12-pounder guns.

== Career ==
In 1758, she was sent to Morocco. A young Johan Peter Wleugel, then with rank of first lieutenant, was among the officers.

In 1762, she was under the command of Andreas Georg Hermann Schultz as part of a squadron.

In 1764–65, she was used as a naval training ship under the command of Ulrik Christian Kaas.

She was laer stationed at Helsingør as a guard ship to ensure that passing vessels paid Sound Dues. In 1769, she was under the command of Christopher Carl Hendrik Hohlenberg. In 1770–71, she was under the command of Peter Schiønning. Still under the command of Schiønning, she was subsequently sent to Bornholm and Christiansø with a commission tasked with solving a dispute with the local residents over the payment of extra taxes. Schiønning has provided a detailed account of the voyage in his diary.

== Fate ==
The ship was decommissioned in 1776. A new frigate Hvide Ørn was launched in 1784.

== See also ==
- HDMS Hvide Ørn
