= 1733 in Denmark =

- Decades: 1710s; 1720s; 1730s; 1740s; 1750s
- See also: Other events of 1733; List of years in Denmark

Events from the year 1733 in Denmark.

== Incumbents ==
- Monarch – Christian VI
- Prime minister – Iver Rosenkrantz

== Events ==
=== Undated ===
- The introduction of the Stavnsbånd, a serfdom-like institution later abolished on 20 June 1798.

== Births ==
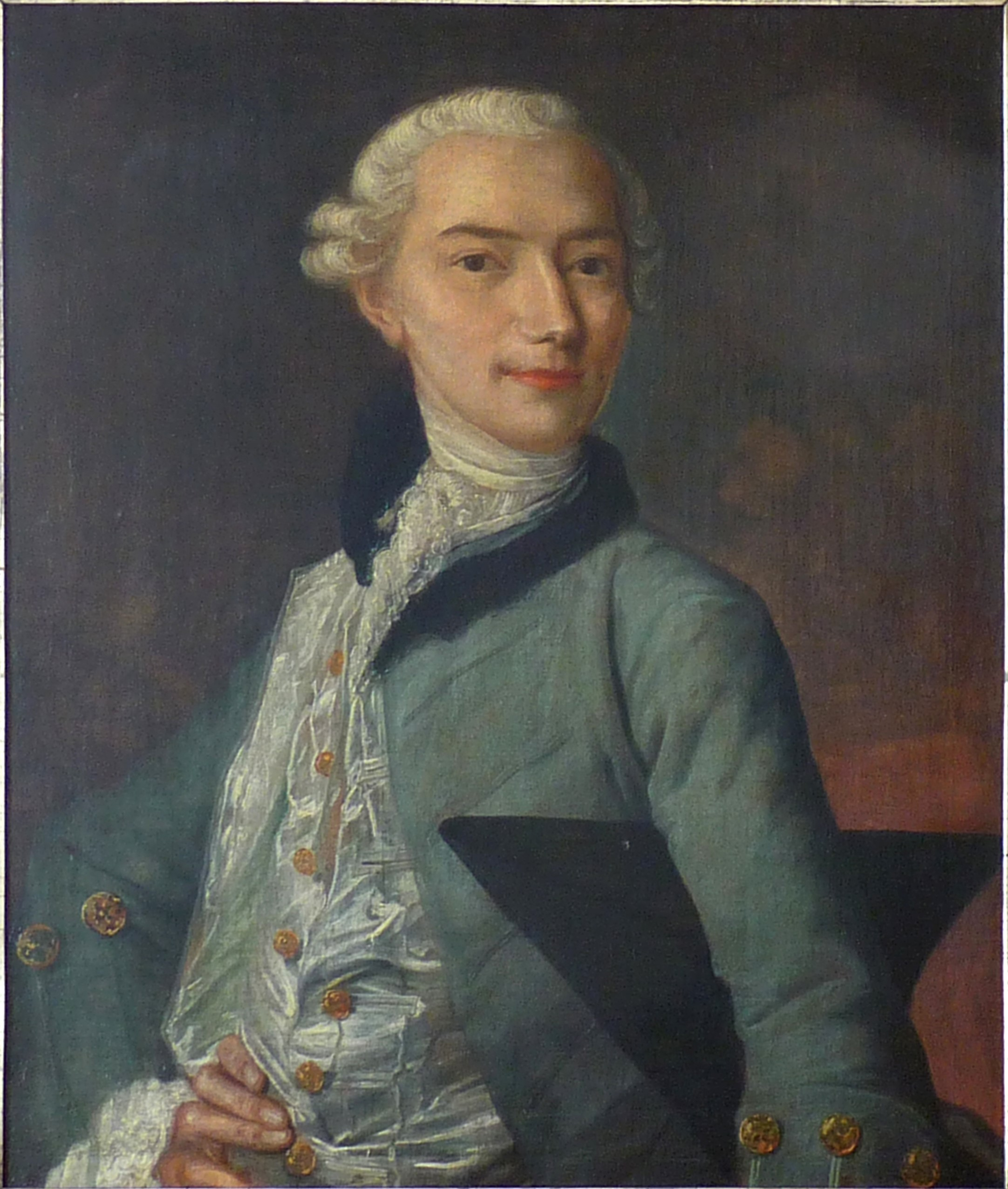
Frederik Bargum.

- 1 September – Gustav Frederik Holck-Winterfeldt, landowner and government official (died 1776)
- 8 October - Peter Holm, government official and topographical writer (d.1817)
- 9 October – * Frederik Bargum, businessman (died 1813)

== Deaths ==
- 4 July – Wilhelm Edinger, merchant and ship-owner (born 1659)
