= 1772 in Denmark =

- Decades: 1750s; 1760s; 1770s; 1780s; 1790s
- See also: Other events of 1772; List of years in Denmark

Events from the year 1772 in Denmark.

== Incumbents ==
- Monarch – Christian VII
- Prime minister – Johann Friedrich Struensee (until 17 January), Ove Høegh-Guldberg

== Events ==
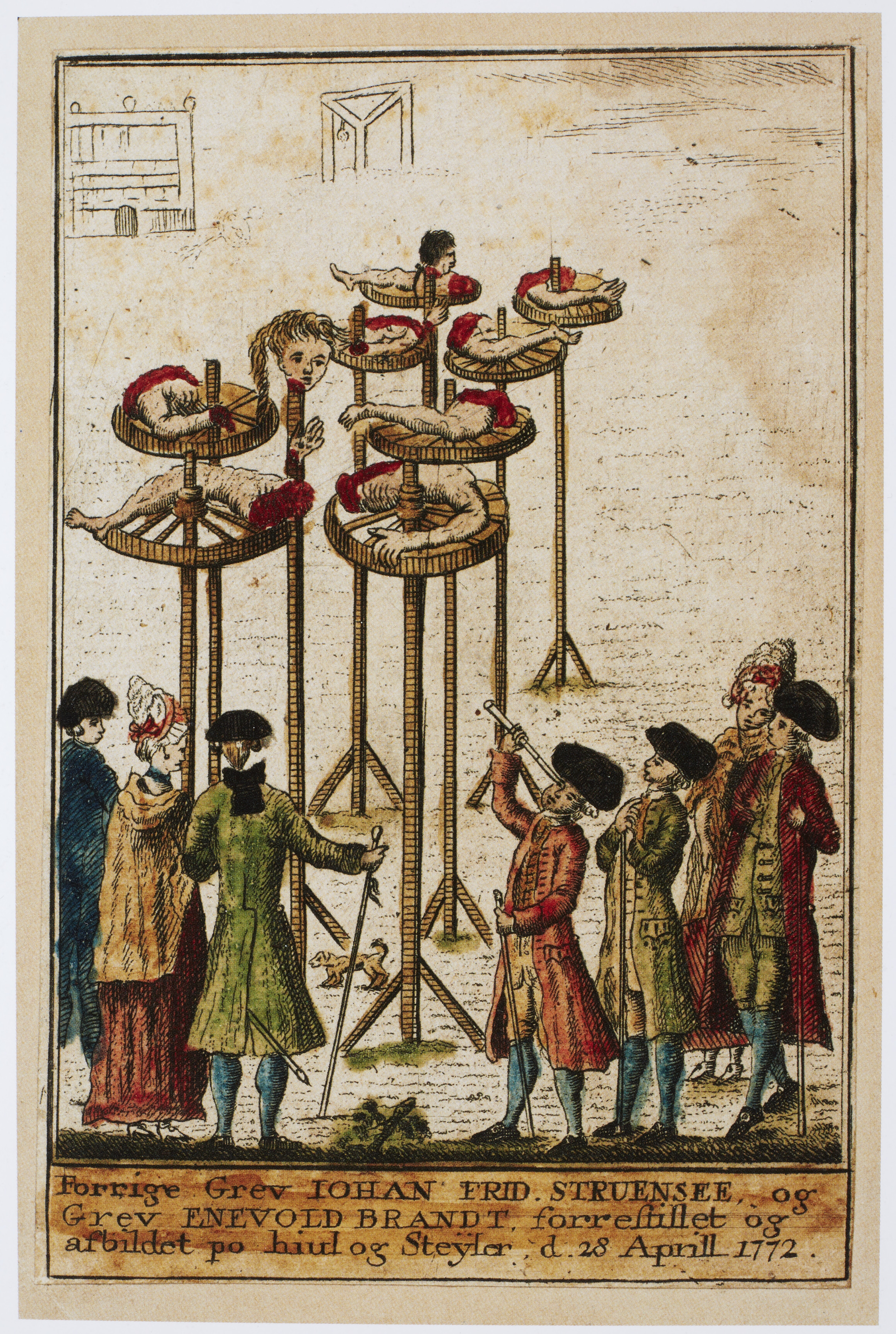
Struense and Brandt on the wheels

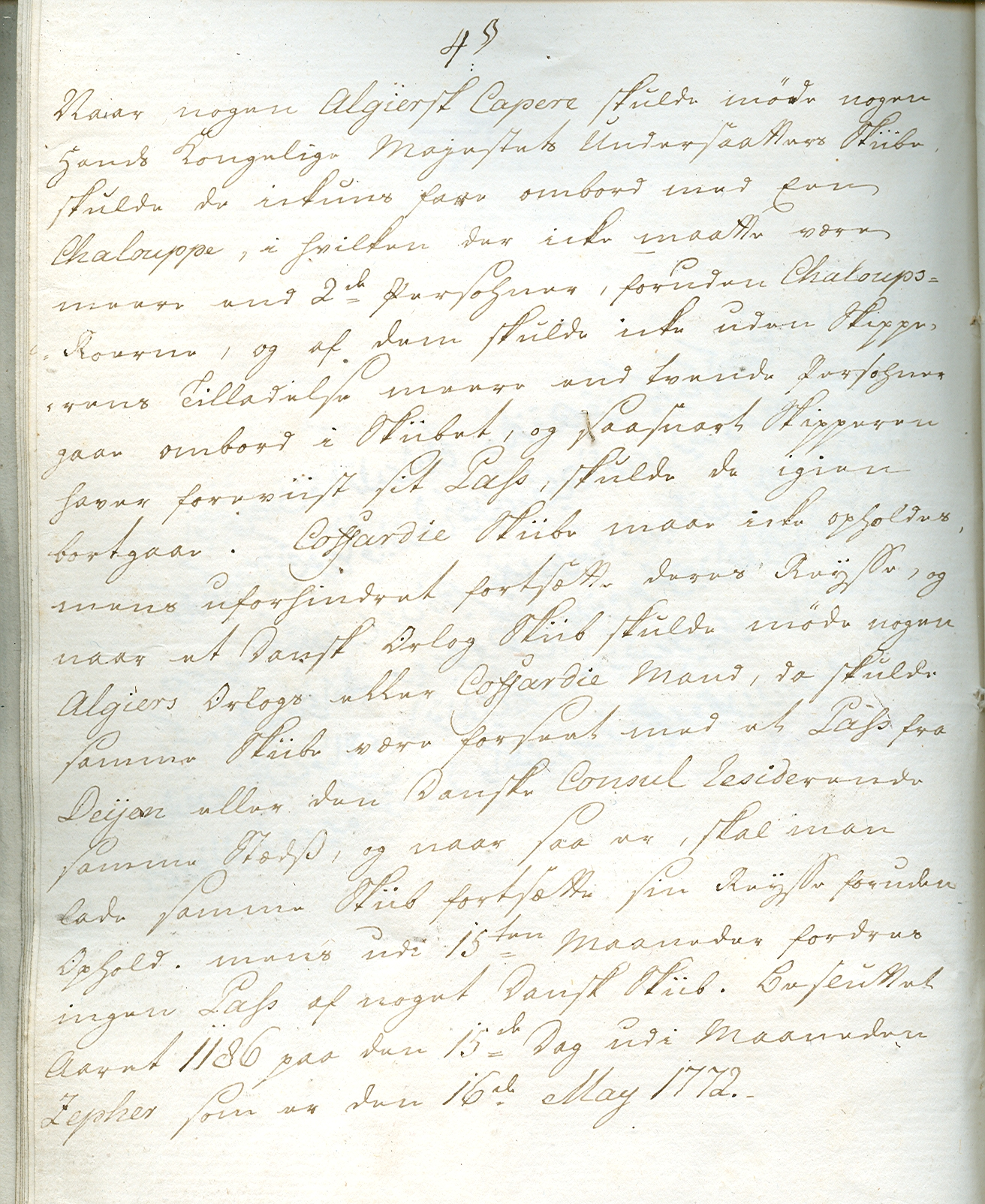
15 May: A page from the treaty between Denmark and Algiers.

- 18 January – Queen Caroline Matilda, Johann Friedrich Struensee and Enevold Brandt were arrested and their rule ended in a palace coup.
- 28 April – Struensee and Brandt are executed by beheading at the Eastern Commons outside Copenhagen. Afterwards their bodies are drawn and quartered.
- 30 April – The Norwegian Society is founded in Copenhagen as a national venue for Norwegian students.
- 16 May – A treaty between Christian VII and the Bey of Algiers brings an end to the Danish-Algerian War.
- 14 October – Royal Danish Medical Society is founded.

=== Undated ===
- Frederick, Hereditary Prince of Denmark is designated as regent of Denmark.
- Masquerades, horse races and foreign line dancers are prohibited.
- The military language for use in writing and commands is changed from German to Danish.

== Births ==
- 17 June – Hans Peter Holm, naval officer (died 1812)
- 19 August – Johan Frederik Bardenfleth, naval officer, court official and governor-general of the Danish West Indies (died 1833)

== Deaths ==
- April 28
- 7 January – Lars Dalager, businessman /born 1722)
  - Enevold Brandt, courtier (born 1738)
  - Johann Friedrich Struensee, physician, statesman, de facto regent of Denmark (born 1737)
- 8 June – Ulrik Fredrik de Cicignon, military officer (born 1698)
- 17 August – Christen Lindencrone, merchant and landowner (born 1703)

=== Full date missing ===
- Johanne Seizberg, illustrator and teacher (born 1732)

== See also ==
- A Royal Affair, 2012 film inspired by the events leading up to Struensee's death.
