= Frederik Christian Willerup =

Danish sculptor

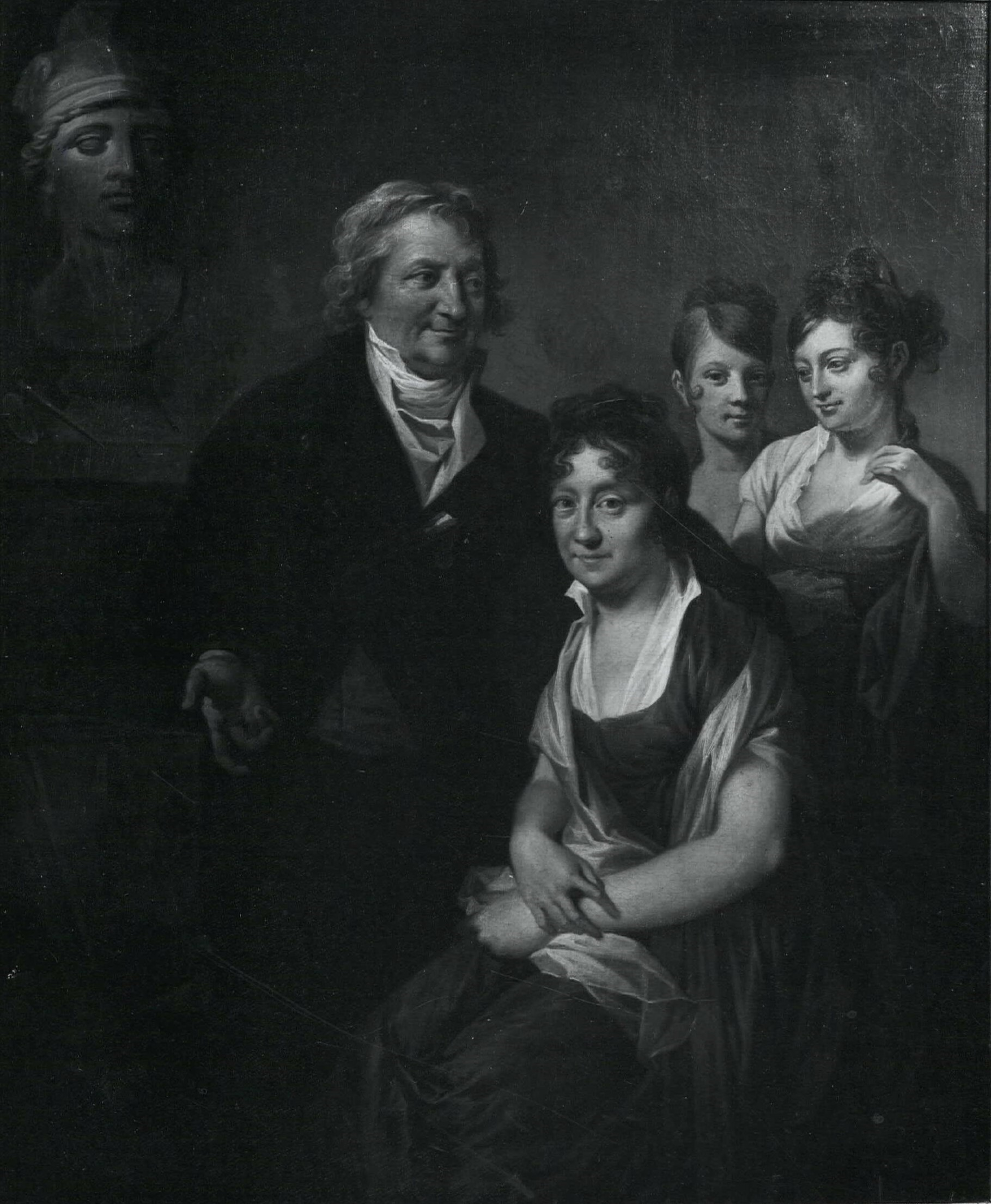
C. A. Lorentzen: Frederik Christian Willerup and Anne D. Kisby with their daughters Ane Cathrine and Magdalene.

Frederik Christian Willerup (5 February 1742 - 7 May 1819) was a Danish sculptor who worked at the Royal Danish Dockyard on Holmen in Copenhagen. He lived most of his life in Denmark-Norway.

== Biography ==
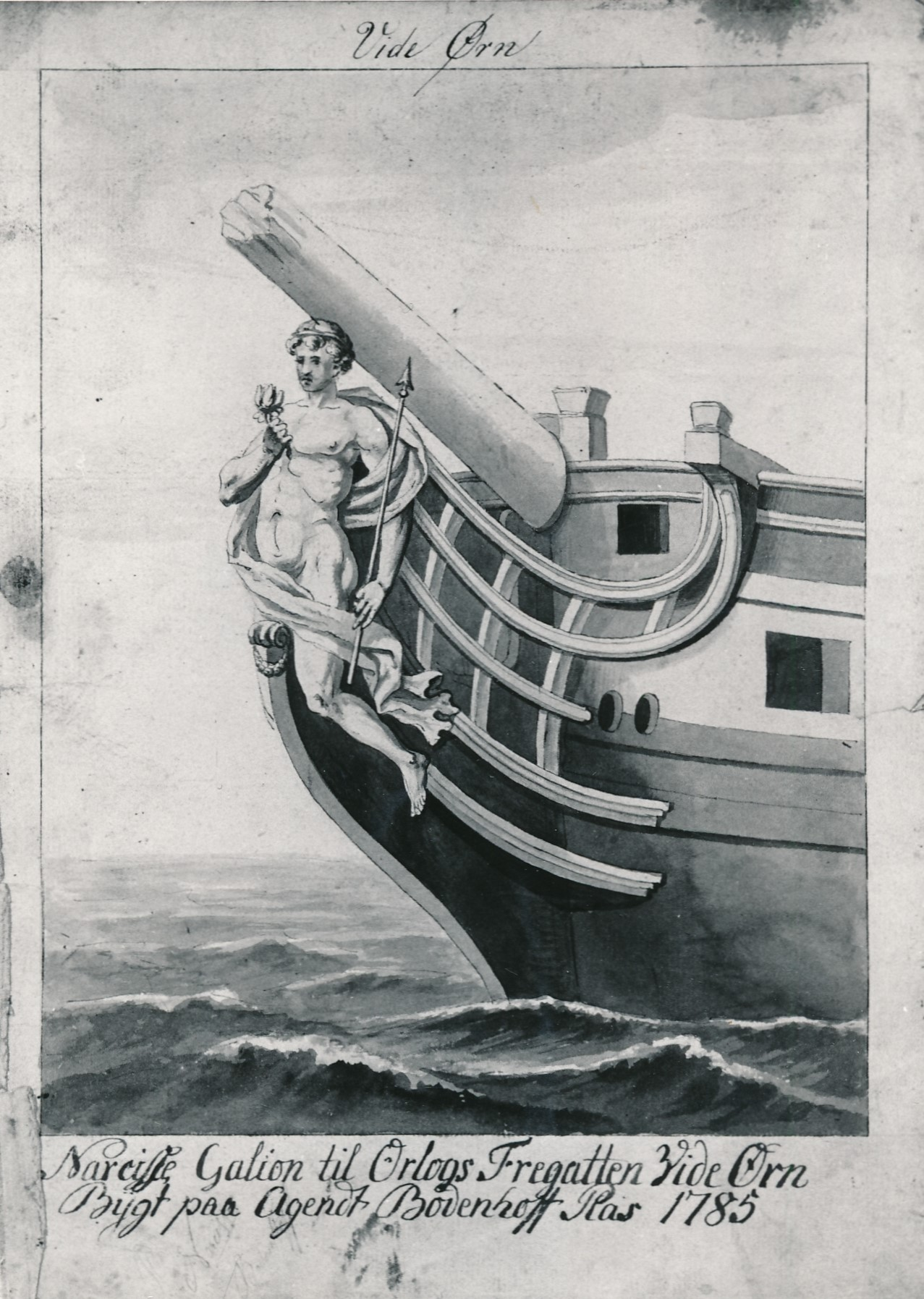
F. C. Willerup's sketchbook of HDMS Hvide Ørn's's figurehead.

Willerup was born on 5 February 1742 in Copenhagen, the son of Andreas Willerup and Anna Cathrine Holm, He was married to Anne Dorthea Kisbye )1759-1836).

Willerup worked as the navy's sculptor at the Royal Danish Shipyard from 1776. He was responsible for creating figureheads, gallery ornamentation and other ornamental features for the ships constructed at the shipyard.

He also made figureheads and ornaments for private shipowners, for instance at Larsens Plads, where a young Bertel Thorvaldsen and his father Gotskalk Thorvaldsen also worked. Thorvaldsen carved a wooden relief for a gate of a rider on horseback (now in Thorvaldsens Museum), after Willerup's drawing. Without the model's knowledge, Thorvaldsen also executed a portrait of Willerup in 1796. According to Just Mathias Thiele's Thorvaldsen biography (Vol. III, p. 50), Willerup had requested "a small work in remembrance" from his young colleague, before Thorvaldsen's departure for Rome. Thorvaldsen did not immediately seem to have complied with the request, but after his departure the bust was found in a box with the inscription: "for Willerup". The portrait is not known today.

Other works by Willerup include four allegorical sculptures of "The Four Winds" for the new Knippel Bridge in Copenhagen. They are now in the collection of the Museum of Copenhagen.

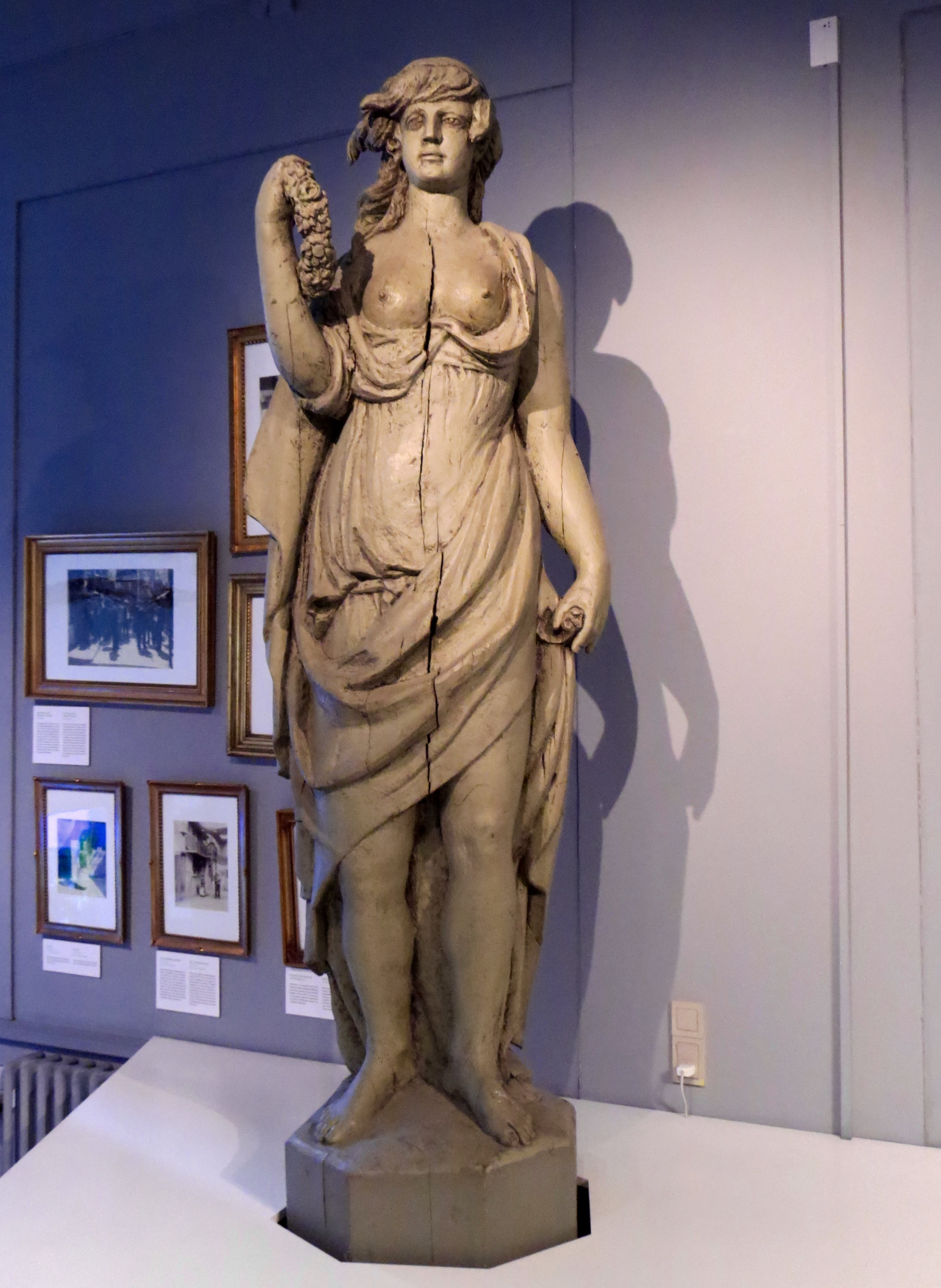
The East Wind

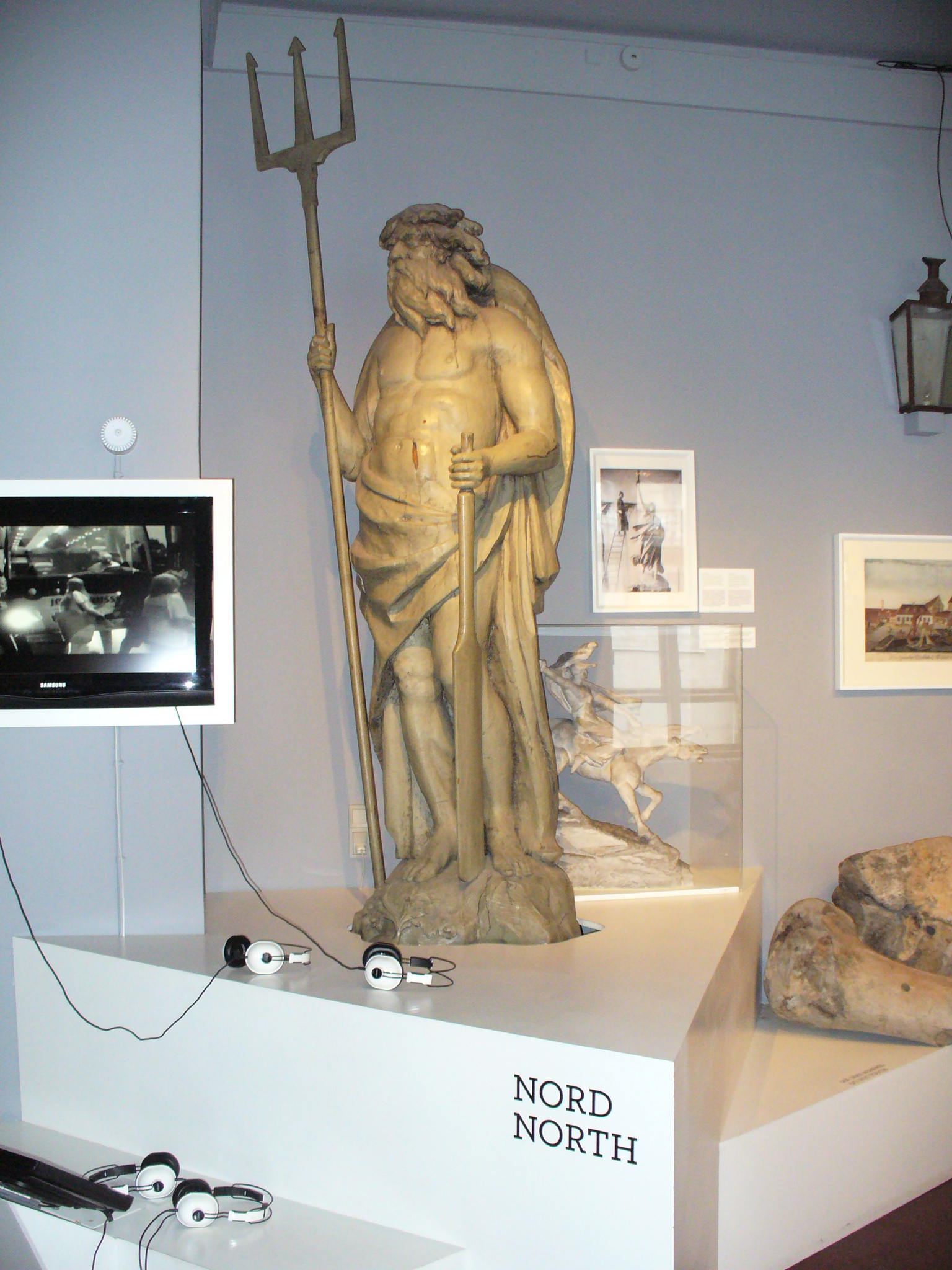
The North Wind

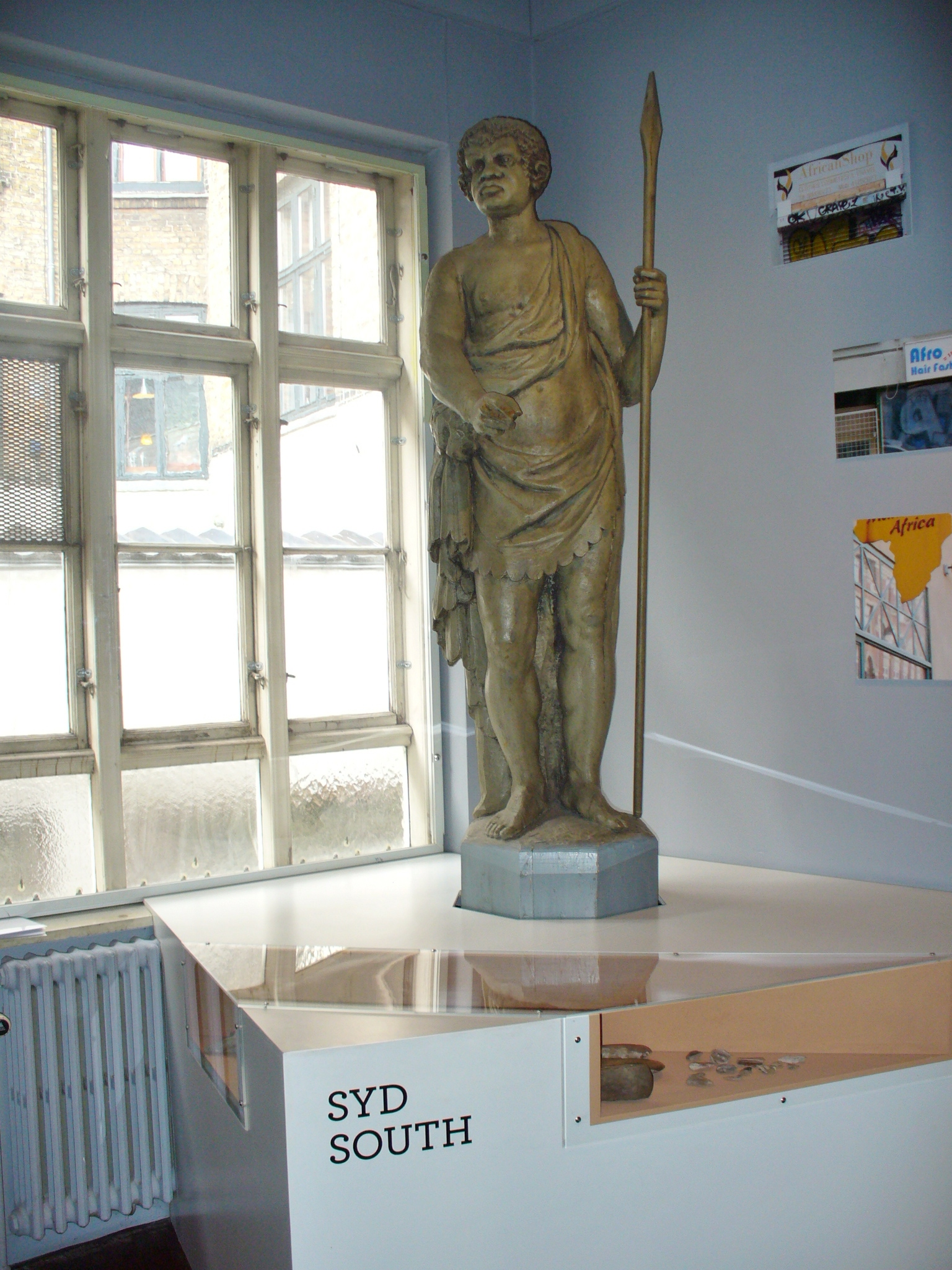
The South Wind.

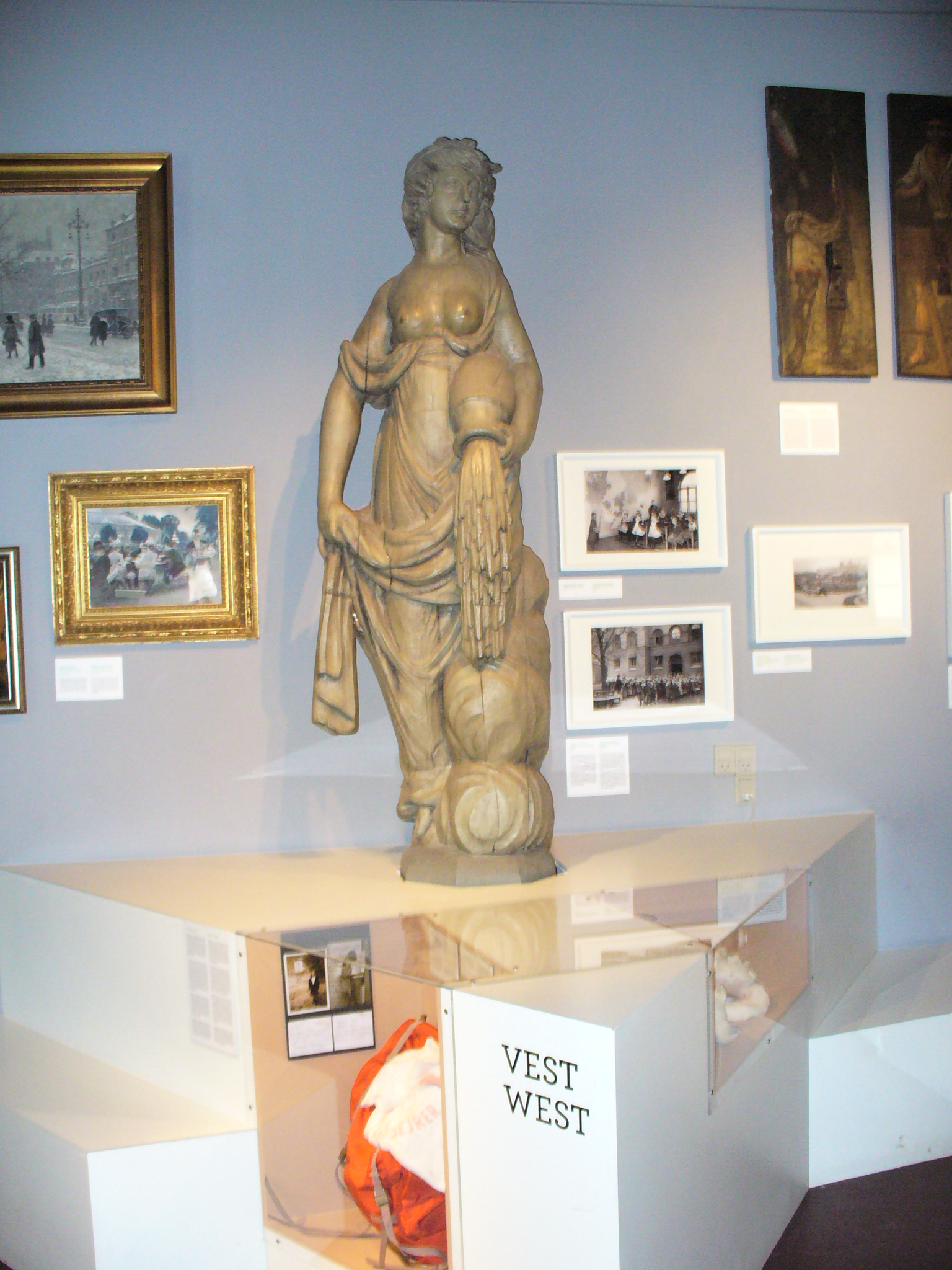
The West Wind
