= HMS Justitia =

Four ships of the Royal Navy have been named HMS Justitia, after the goddess Justitia, of Roman mythology:

- HMS Justitia (1777) was a prison ship, formerly a merchant vessel, purchased in 1777 and in service until at least 1795.
- HMS Justitia (1807) was a 74-gun third rate captured from the Danish at the Battle of Copenhagen in 1807 and broken up in 1814.
- HMS Justitia was a 64-gun third rate, formerly a Dutch ship. She was seized in 1796 and named HMS Zealand, renamed HMS Justitia in 1812 and was sold in 1830.
- HMS Justitia (1830) was a convict ship, launched in 1799 as the British East India Company East Indiaman Admiral Rainier. The Royal Navy acquired her 1804 and commissioned her as the 50-gun fourth rate HMS Hindostan. She was reduced to 20 guns and renamed HMS Dolphin in 1819, and then HMS Justitia in 1830. She retained that name until her sale in 1855.

== Ships of other nations ==
- HDMS Justitia (1707) was a Danish ship-of-the-line heavily involved in the Great Northern War
- HDMS Justitia (1777) is the same ship as HMS Justitia (1807) above
- The brig Justitia was captured by HMS Medusa and prize money paid in 1810

== See also ==
- Justitia (disambiguation)
