= HDMS Hvide Ørn =

HDMS Hvide Ørn may refer to the following ships:

- HDMS Hvide Ørn (1715), a frigate of the Royal Dano-Norwegian Navy
- HDMS Hvide Ørn (1753), a frigate of the Royal Dano-Norwegian Navy
- HDMS Hvide Ørn (1784), a frigate of the Royal Dano-Norwegian Navy
- HDMS Hvide Ørn (1798), a frigate of the Royal Dano-Norwegian Navy
