= Yellow Palace, Copenhagen =

Building in Copenhagen Municipality, Denmark

Coordinates: 55.6829°N 12.5926°E

The Yellow Palace
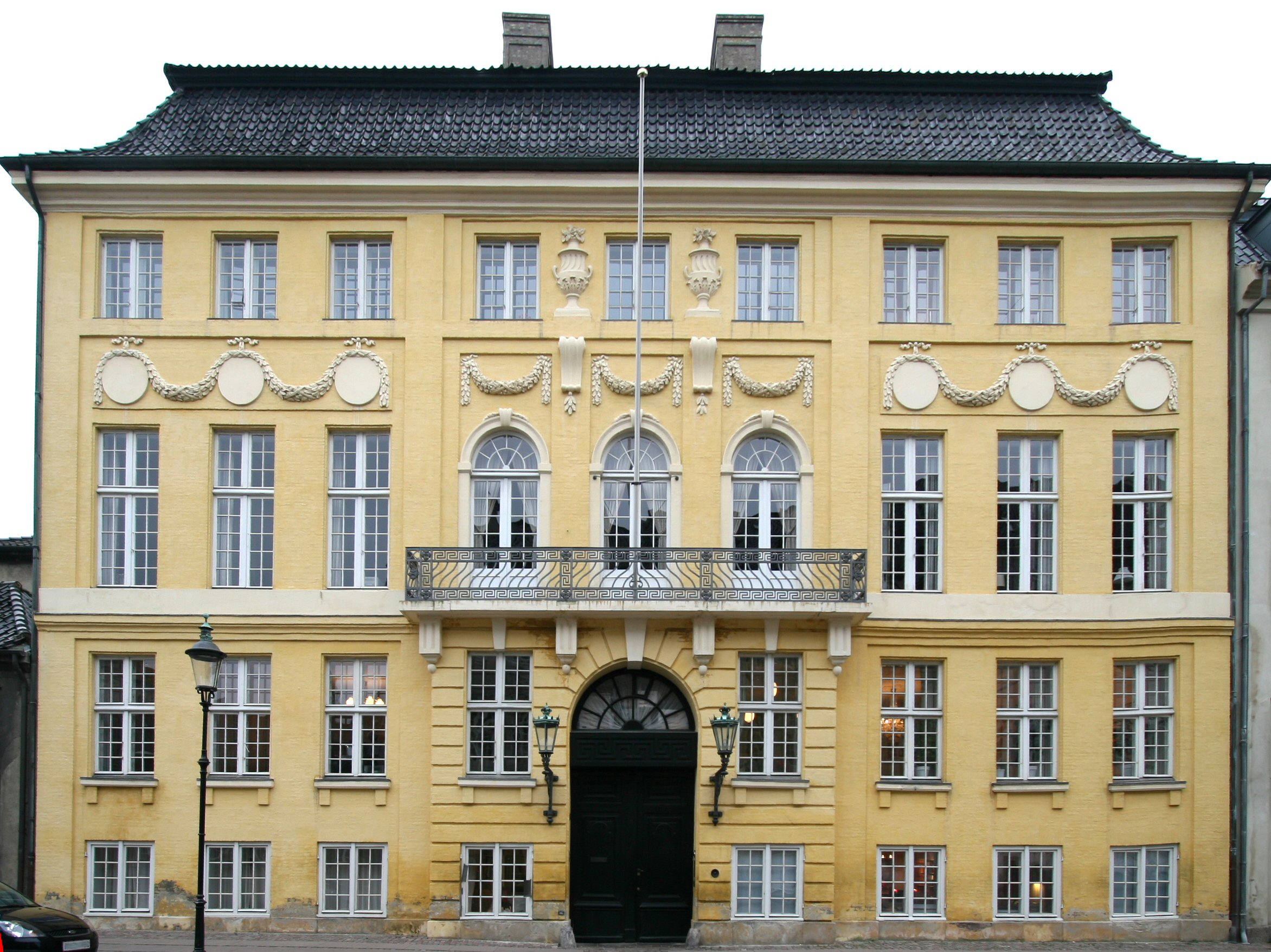
- Interactive map of the The Yellow Palace area

General information
- Architectural style: Neoclassical
- Location: Copenhagen, Denmark
- Construction started: 1758
- Completed: 1764
- Client: H. F. Bargum

Design and construction
- Architect: Nicolas-Henri Jardin

The Yellow Palace (Danish: Det Gule Palæ), or Bergum's Mansion, is an 18th-century town mansion situated at Amaliegade 18, next to Amalienborg Palace, in the Frederiksstaden district of Copenhagen, Denmark. It is considered the first example of Neoclassical architecture in Copenhagen.

Originally built as a burgher's home, the mansion was acquired by the Danish royal family in 1810. Prince Christian of Glücksborg, later to become Christian IX of Denmark, took up residence there, and it became the birthplace of his children Frederik VIII of Denmark, Alexandra, Queen of the United Kingdom, George I of Greece and Maria Feodorovna, Empress of Russia.

Today the building is owned by the Danish Palaces and Properties Agency and houses the Lord Chamberlain's Office.

== History ==
=== Early history ===
When Frederiksstaden was laid around 1748, it was envisioned as a uniform Rococo district. All new buildings had to comply with certain guidelines stipulated by Nicolai Eigtved, the district's master planner. After Eigtved's death in 1754 they were in principle upheld, but as fashions changed they were somewhat relaxed.

In the new cadastre of 1756, the property was listed as No. 71 I. It was by then owned by Johan Jegind. On Christian Gedde's map of St. Ann's Quarter from 1757, it was marked as No. 316.

The Yellow Mansion was built from 1759 to 1764 for the merchant and slave trader Frederik Bargum. The architect was Nicolas-Henri Jardin and he designed it in the Neoclassical style.

=== Carl Friedrich Busky, 1775–1808 ===
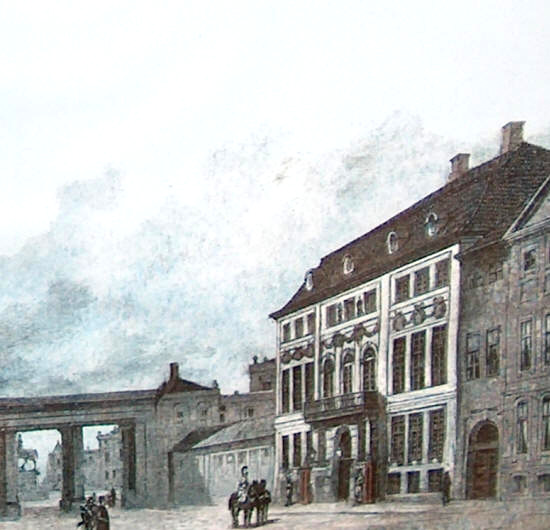
The Yellow Palace, early 19th century

Carl Friedrich Busky (1743–1808), a wealthy merchant and Prussian consul, acquired the mansion in 1775.

Busky was married to Ana Sophia Gad, a daughter of shipbuilder at Fabritius & Wever's shipyard Ole Gad and his wife Maren Gad. They resided in the building with their five-year-old daughter Ana Maria Elisabet, a coachman, a male servant and two maids at the time of the 1787 census.

Another daughter, Caroline Frederikke Louise Busky (1789–1872), was born in 1789. She was later married to Peter Sigvard Neergaard (1784–1858).

In the new cadastre of 1806, the property was listed as No. 123. Busky owned it until his death in 1808.

=== Royal ownership ===
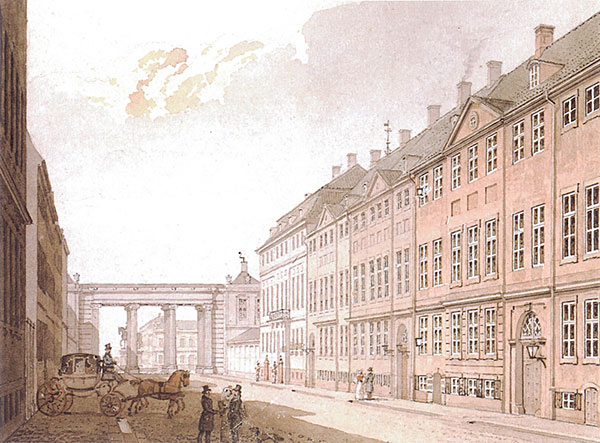
Amaliegade and the Yellow Palace in 1830

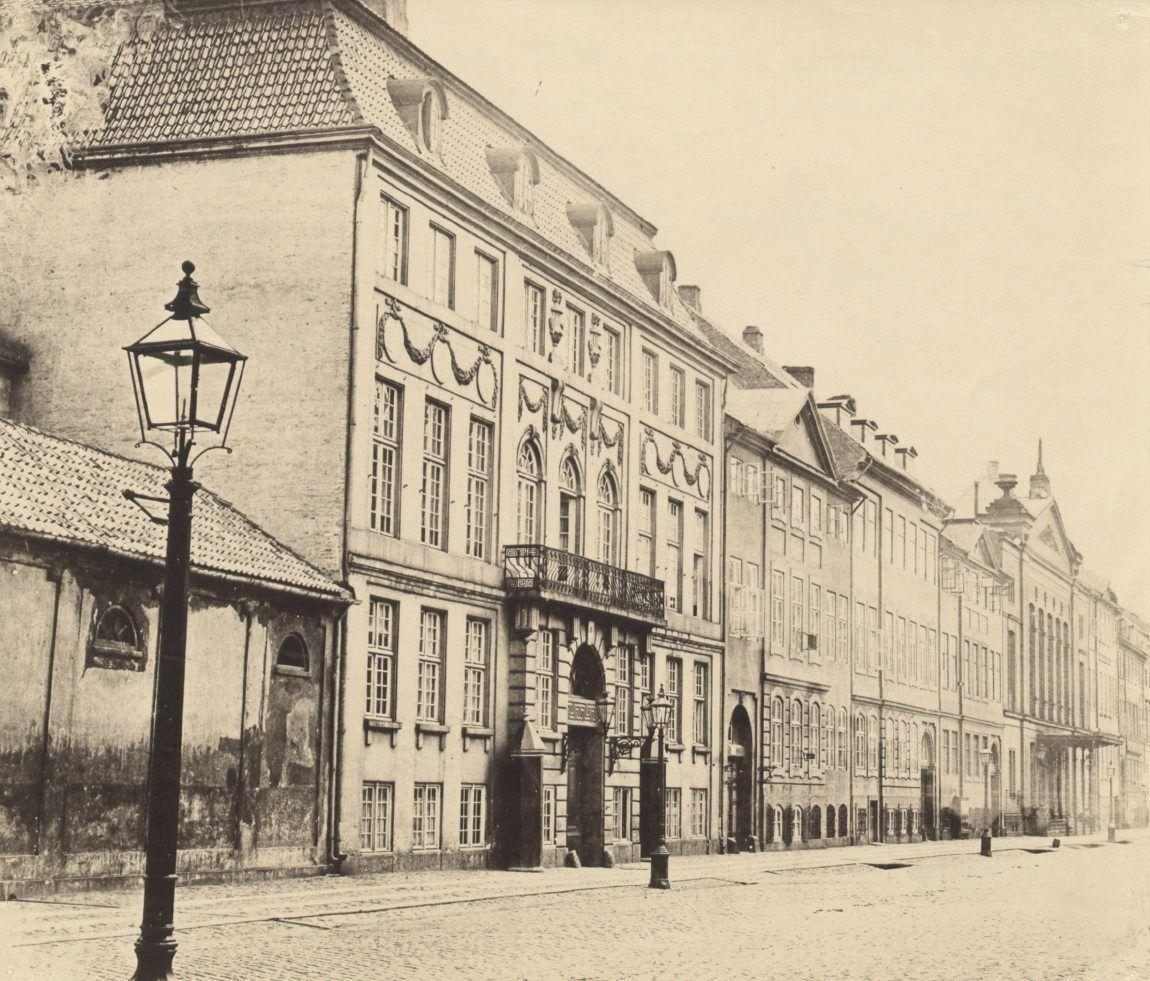
The building in the 1870s

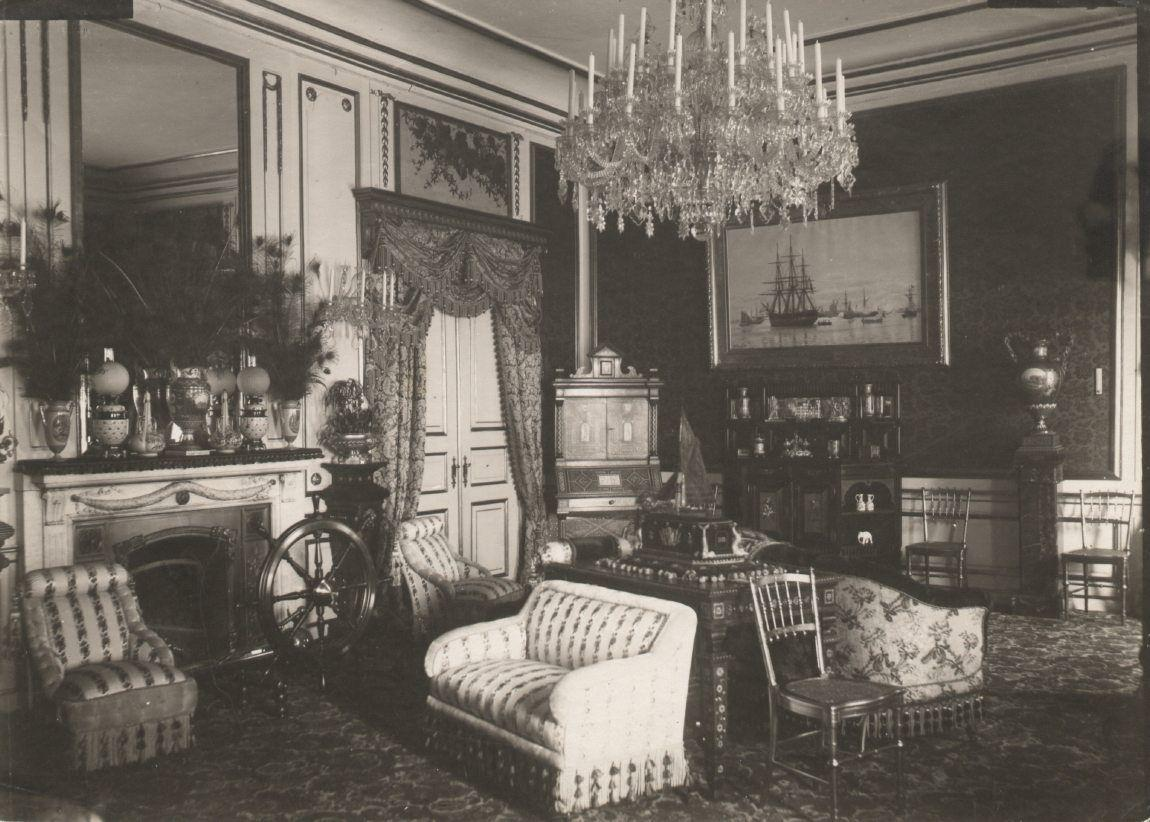
Prince Valdemar's living room, 1890

King Frederick VI purchased the mansion in 1810 to use it as a guest residence for relatives visiting the royal family. In 1837, King Frederick VI handed the property over to his wife's nephew Prince Christian of Schleswig-Holstein-Sonderburg-Glücksburg, who had just arrived in Copenhagen from Germany. At this stage no one knew that he was later to become King Christian IX as the first Glücksburg king of Denmark. Prince Christian took up residence in the mansion and lived there with his family until 1865, when he became king and moved into Amalienborg Palace.

Later, his youngest son Prince Valdemar lived in the Yellow Palace with his family until his death in 1939 as its last royal resident.

== Architecture ==
The building has been described as the first neoclassic building in Copenhagen.

The site also includes Garderstalden (English: Guard's Stable), which was built in 1842 to designs by Jørgen Hansen Koch. It was used for Christian of Glücksborgs's horses and for the horses of the Royal Guards who were on duty at the mansion. In 1923 the roof was converted into a mansard roof with accommodation on the upper floor. The building was renovated and adapted by Bertelsen & Schewing in 2013. It contains administration on the ground floor and apartments on the upper floor.

== See also ==
- Architecture of Denmark
