= Justitia (disambiguation) =

Justitia is Lady Justice, an allegorical personification of the moral force in judicial systems.

Justitia may also refer to:

- Justitia (crustacean), a crustacean genus
- 269 Justitia, an asteroid
- HDMS Justitia, the name of ships of the Royal Danish Navy
- HMS Justitia, the name of four ships of the Royal Navy
- Polish Judges Association "Iustitia"

== See also ==
- Justicia (disambiguation)
