= Knippelsbro =

Bridge in Denmark

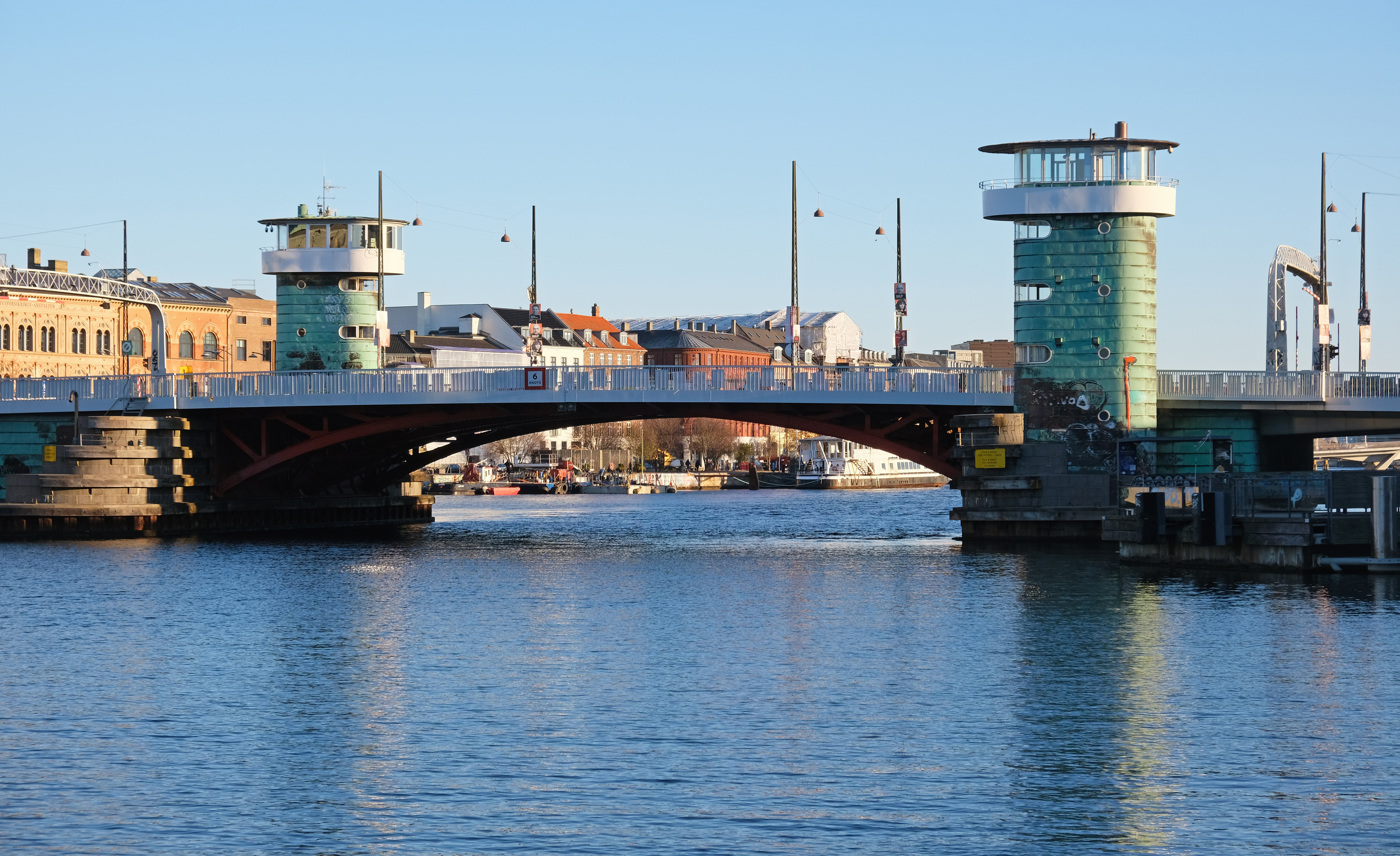
- Coordinates: 55°40′29″N 12°35′14″E
- Carries: Motor vehicles, pedestrian and bicycle traffic
- Crosses: Copenhagen Inner Harbour
- Locale: Slotsholmen; Christianshavn

Characteristics
- Design: Bascule bridge
- Total length: 115 m
- Width: 27 m
- Clearance below: 52 ft (16 m)

History
- Designer: Kaj Gottlob
- Opened: December 17, 1937

Location
- Interactive map of Knippelsbro

Knippelsbro (English: Knippel Bridge) is a bascule bridge across the Inner Harbour of Copenhagen, Denmark, connecting Børsgade (English: Stock Exchange Street) on Zealand-side Slotsholmen to Torvegade (English: Market Street) on Christianshavn. It is one of only two bridges to carry motor vehicles across the harbour in central Copenhagen, the other being Langebro.

The bridge, the fifth on the site, is 115 metres long and was inaugurated in 1937.

== History ==
=== 1620: The first bridge ===
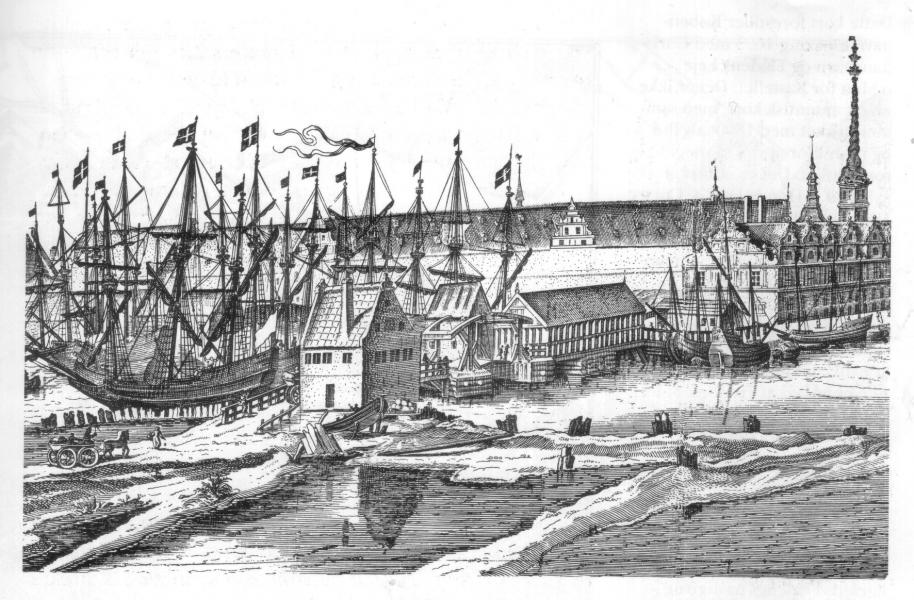
Knippelsbro in c. 1650Co

The first bridge between Copenhagen and Christianshavn was constructed in 1618–20 by Christian IV in connection with the foundation of Christianshavn. The bridge was called the "Great Amager Bridge" or "the long bridge".

=== 1712: The second bridge ===
A new wooden bridge was built in the same location in 1712. It was decorated with four Hercules sculptures by the artist Johan Christopher Sturmberg. Neither the sculptures or images of them exist today.

=== 1816: The third bridge ===
The bridge was replaced by a new, wooden bridge in 1816. The bridge had two gates which were decorated with four wooden sculptures of "The Four Winds". They were created by the sculptor Frederik Christian Willerup. They are now owned by the Museum of Copenhagen.

=== 1869: The Burmeister & Wain bridge ===
In 1868–69, Burmeister & Wain constructed a railway bridge based on renderings from the grocers J. Adolphs and Christian August Broberg. It ran from Slotsholmsgade to Torvegade and it was therefore possible to use the old bridge while it was built. It opened on 1 August 1869.

=== 1908: The Axel Berg bridge ===
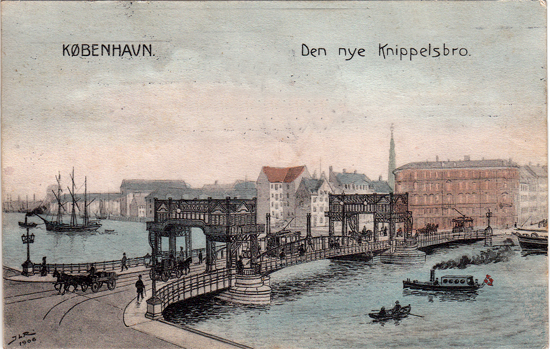
The 1906 bridge

A new railway bridge was built in 1908. It was designed by the architect Axel Berg and had two characteristic pavilions. It was built by the Port Authority's building master H. C. V. Møller and opened on 30 December 1908. It ran from Børsgade to Torvegade.

=== 1937: The current bridge ===
In the first half of the 1930s, it was once again decided to build a new bridge. It was decided to build it at the same site as the old one and it was therefore necessary to build a temporary bridge. It was in use from 1934 to 1937.

The current Knippelsbro was inaugurated on 17 December 1947. It was designed by Kaj Gottlob and built by Wright, Thomsen & Kier in collaboration with Burmeister & Wain.

== Name ==
The bridge was originally known as Store Amager Bro (English: Great Amager Bridge) or Langebro (English: Long Bridge) and from around 1700 Christianshavns Bro (English: Christianshavn's Bridge) is seen. The current name stems from Hans Knip who became bridge caretaker in 1641, in charge of operating the bridge and collecting tolls from passing ships. His house became known as Knippenshus and during the 17th century the bridge became known as Knippensbro. The current form of the name (which misleadingly seems to be derived from the word knippel - "cudgel" or "truncheon") is seen from the second half of the 19th century but has never been officially approved.

== Cultural references ==
- The Olsen-banden steals the priceless Bedford Diamonds from a car on Knippel Bridge at 0:57:54 in The Last Exploits of the Olsen Gang.
- A view of Knippel Bridge from Hotel Europa (now DanHostel Copenhagen City) is also seen at 1:07:19 in The Olsen Gang on the Track.

== Gallery ==
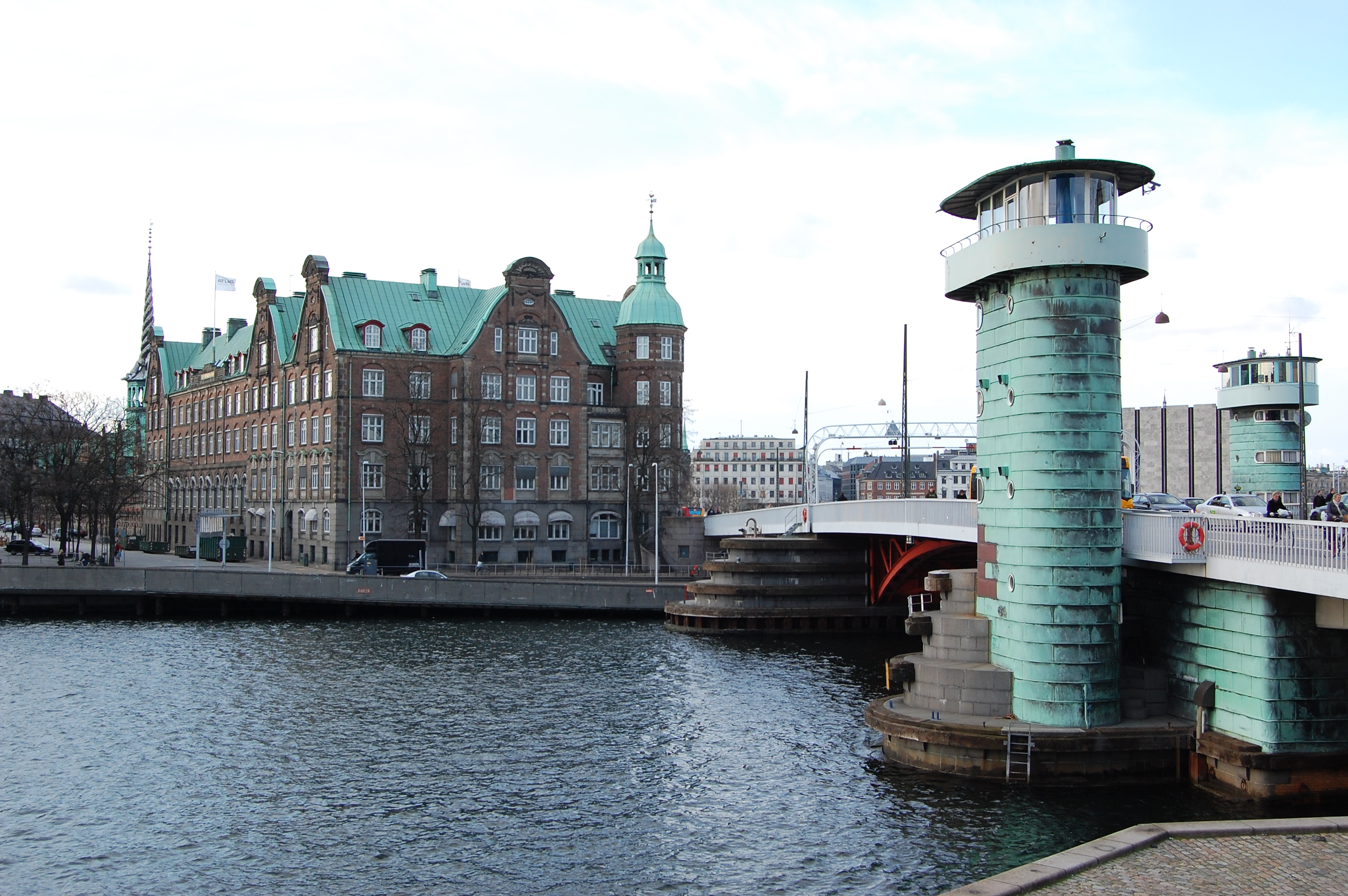
View along the bridge from Christianshavn

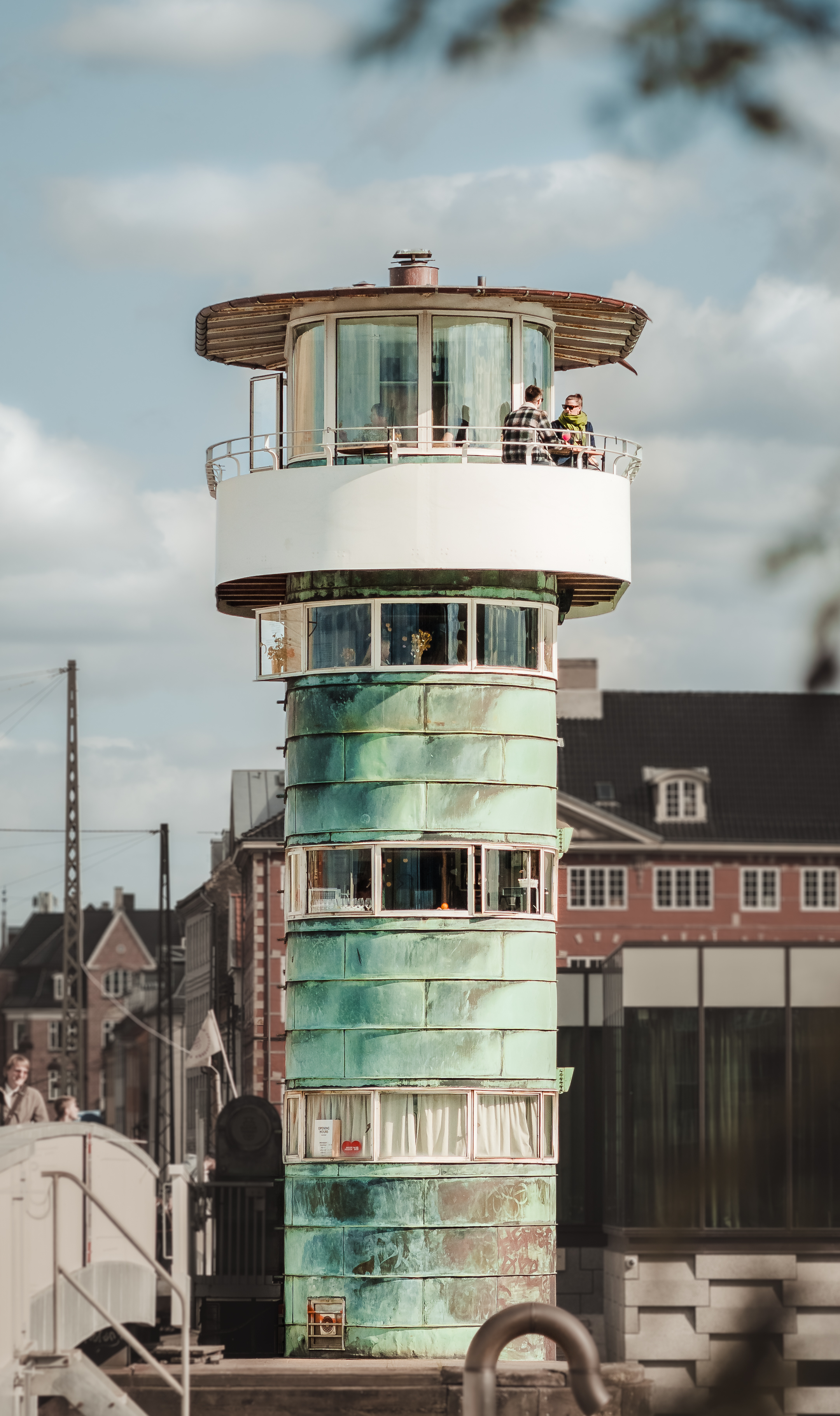
Knippelsbro control tower seen from North, now functioning as a cafe

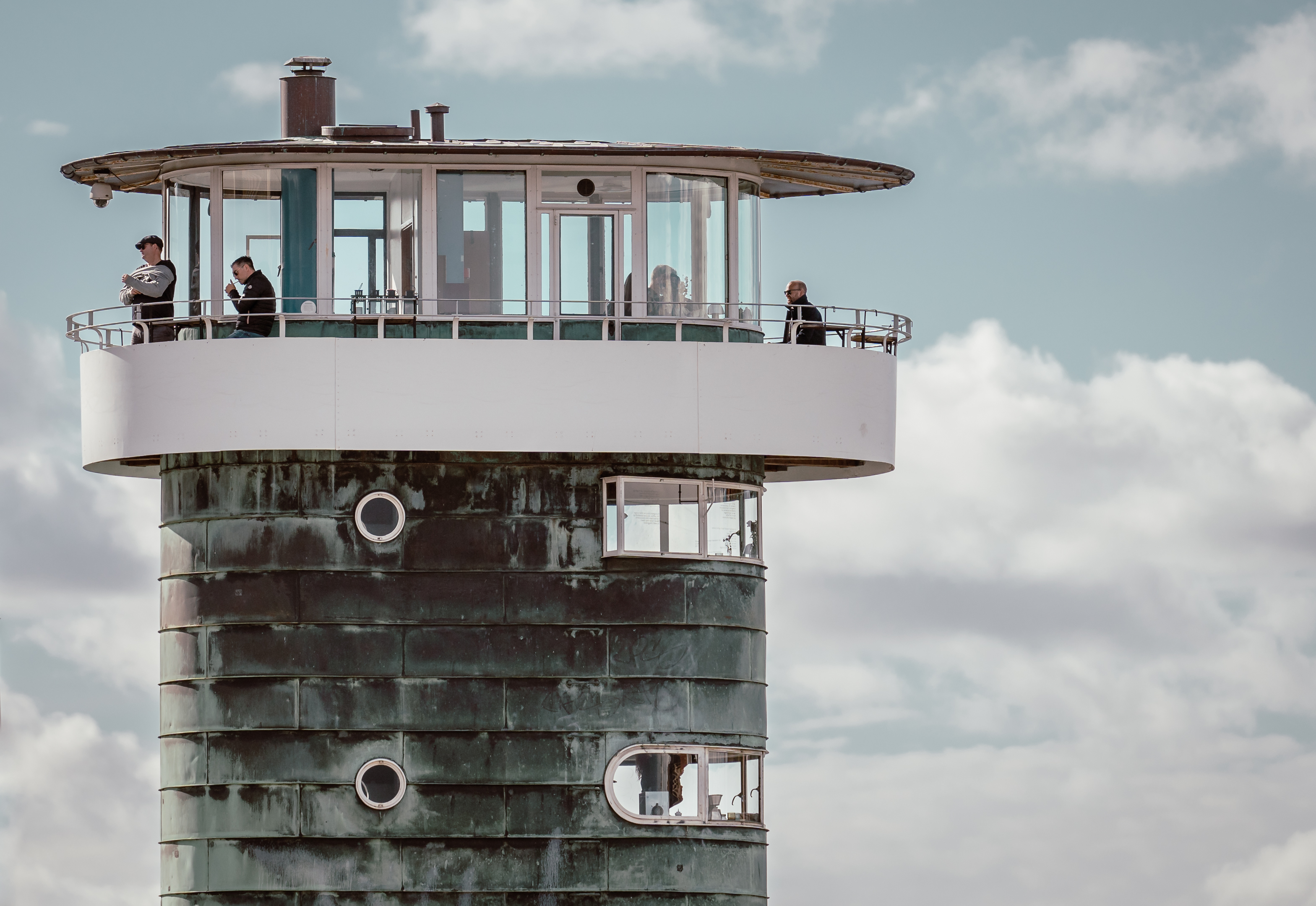
Knippelsbro control tower seen from East
