= Johan Peter Wleugel =

Norwegian naval officer

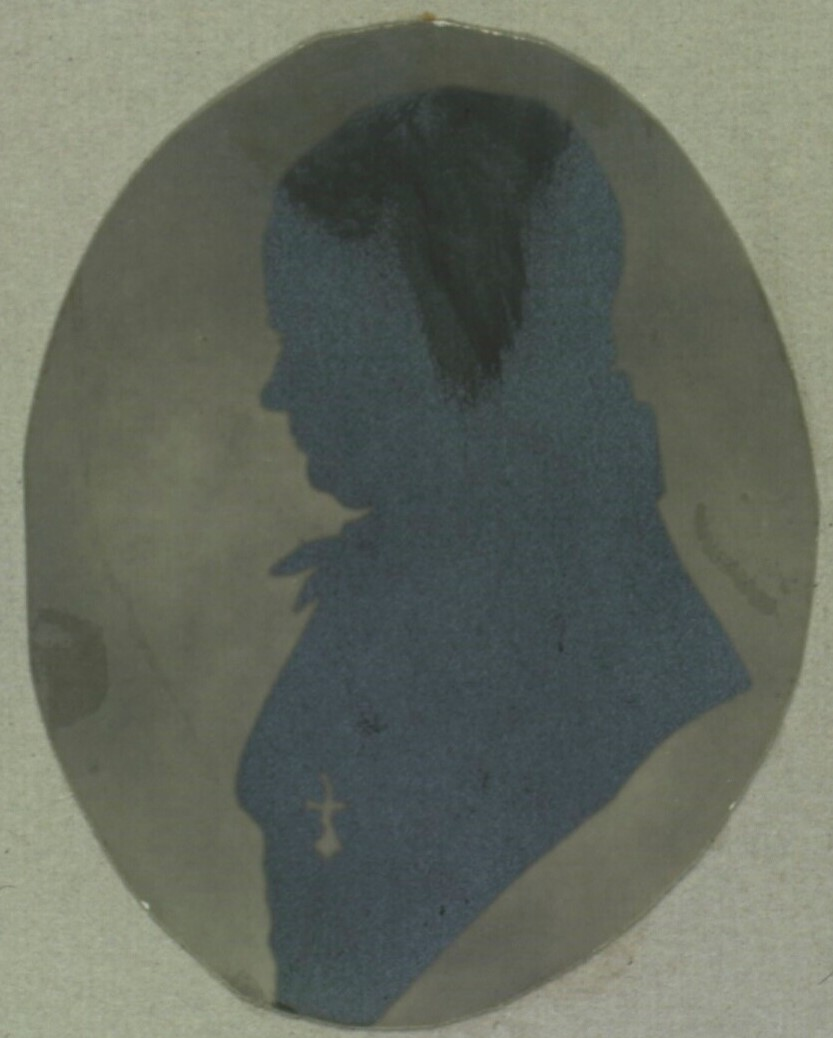
Silhouette portrait of Wleugel

Admiral Johan Peter Wleugel (14 February 1736 – 4 January 1825) was a Dano-Norwegian naval officer who spent the early part of his career in the service of the Royal Dano-Norwegian Navy. After the dissolution of the personal union between Denmark and Norway, in 1814, he continued his career in the Royal Danish Navy, with rank of admiral. He was a member of numerous commissions in the late 18th and early 19th century. He was also active as a cartographer.

== Early life ==
Wleugel was born on 14 February 1736 in Trondheim, the son of colonel lieutenant Peter Johan Wleugel (ca. 1692–1752) and Agnete Schumacher (died 1746). His father, who was born in Tranquebar to a Dutch father and a Danish mother, was commandant of Munkholm. His mother was from Trondheim. After the mother's death, his father married secondly to Joachime Catharine Benzon (1757-1836).

== Career ==
Wleugel became a cadet in 1749, a junior lieutenant in 1755, a senior lieutenant in 1758, captain lieutenant in 1763, captain in 1769, commander captain in 1781, commodore in 1789, counter admiral in 1796, vice admiral in 1800 and admiral in 1812.

In 1751–54, he was in India with the frigate Bornholm. In 1758, he was in Marocco with the frigate Hvide Ørn. In 1759, with the frigate Grønland, he escorted a convoy to St. Martin. In 1760, he was in the Mediterranean Sea with Fyen.

In 1764, he studied water infrastructure abroad. In 1765, he oversaw the construction of bridges and harbour facilities. In 1769, he was second-in-command of Island on a voyage to Algier. In 1770, he was second-in-command of Prinds Friderich on another voyage to Algier. When captain Ahlefeldt died in Gibraltar, he took over the command of the frigate Christiansø in the Mediterranean squadron. When Forskrækkelsen grounded at Varberg in 1772, Wleugel was responsible for salvage from the wreck, and when the ship could not be saved, upon orders, he sold it by public auction. In 1773, he was in England to buy two ships. He bought two American vessels which were commissioned as Crocodillen and Basilisken. In 1775, they were transferred to the Royal Greenland Trading Department without having been fitted out for their original purpose. In 1775, he was tasked with mapping the Roads of Copenhagen (Københavns Red). In 1776, he was captain of the frigate Kiel on an expedition to Iceland, tasked with surveying and mapping the east coast of the island. Wleugel created a series of very detailed maps of the major fjords. These were of great use to seafarers who often sailed into these inlets, either for shelter or resources. In addition, he also created a map of the whole coastline, though this was with fewer details and significantly and accurate.

In 1778–95, he was ekvipagemester of the navy's dry dock in Strandgade. In 1770, he captained the frigate Bornholm on a voyage to the Mediterranean Sea. In 1781, he was flag captain of the Mediterranean squadron. In 1782, he was flag captain of Justitia.

In 1789, he was captain of the ship of the line Fyen. In 1790, he was appointed as head of enrollment, and he also submitted a report concerning the completed renovation of the dock. In 1794, he captained the ship of the line Den Prægtige and in 1705 the Trekroner in the Danish-Swedish squadron in the North Sea under the Swedish baron Palmqvist. At his return to Copenhagen, he left the post as ekvipagemester at the dock to head the 4th Division. In 1796, he captained the ship of the line Skjiold and headed a squadron along the Norwegian coast. He was the same year promoted to counter admiral and was appointed as 2nd military member of the Admiralitets- og Kommissariatskollegiet.

In 1800, when Dixon demonstrated in the Øresund, Wleugel was sent out with an escad as a response. In 1804, he was promoted to 1st Member (1, deputeret) in the admiralty college. In 1807, prior to the blockade of Copenhagen, he escorted Prince Christian Holding.

In 1784, he was a co-founder of Søe-Lieutenant-Selskabet. In 1813, he became a member of the Royal Danish Society of Science and Letters.

During the later part of his career, he was a member of numerous commissions. In 1774, he was a member of the so-called Ejder Commission. In 1777, he was made a member of the Defence Commission. In 1778–96, he was a member of the Construction Commission. In 1785–1814, he was a member of a commission concerning the renovation of the dock. In 1779, he became a member of the Quarantine Commission as well as in the Fire and Water Commissions. In 1802, he was made a member of the Navigation Commission. In 1782–96, he was a member of the Eegleringskommissionen. In 1808, he was a member of a commission concerning provisions to Norway. He retired in 1822.

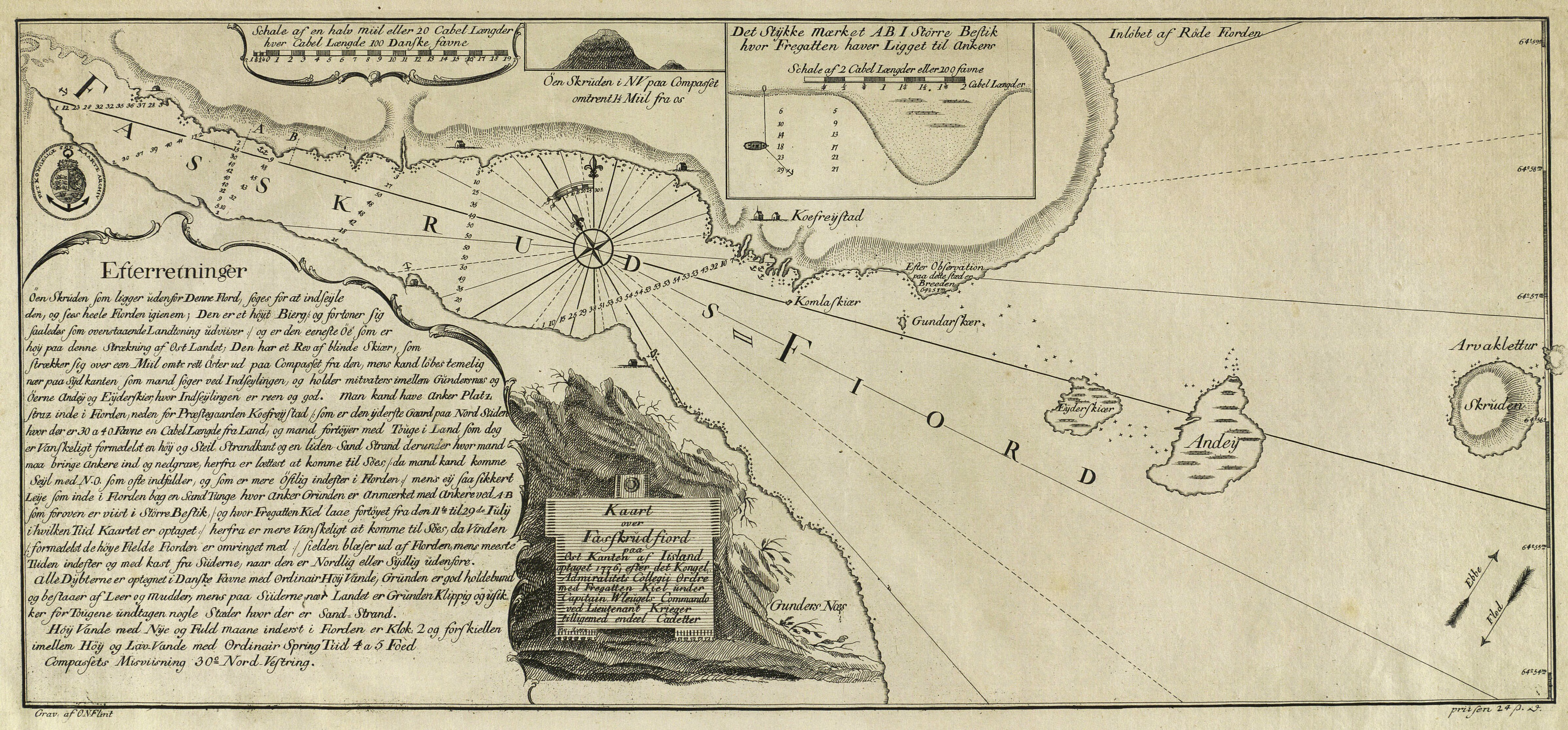
Wleugel's e navigational chart of Fáskrúðsfjörður, a small inlet along Iceland's eastern coast (1788, Copenhagen).

== Personal life ==
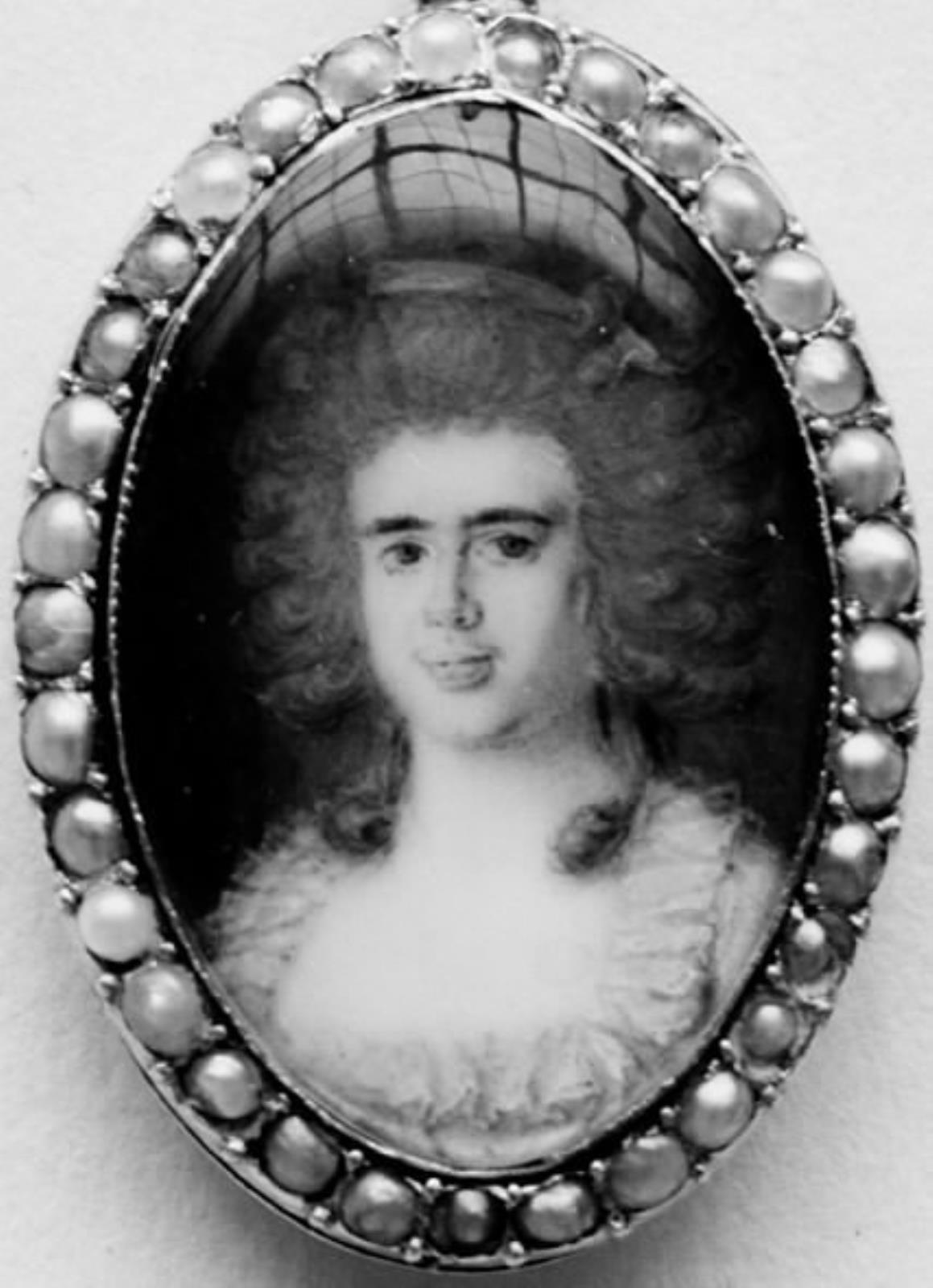
Johanne Sophie Wleugel.

Wleugel was married on 14 December 1763 in Holmen Church to Maria Sophia Schumacher (1744-1790). She was the daughter of Generaltoldkammeret member Cornelius Schumacher (c. 1702–77) and Elisabeth Reiersen (1718–55). They were the parents of five sons and seven daughters. Two of their sons were the naval officers Cornelius Wleugel and Peter Johan Wleugel. The daughter Johanne Sophie was married to Jean de Coninck Jr., a son of Jean de Coninck Sr-.

== Awards ==
Wleugel was ennobled in 1782. He was created a White Knight in 1802. In 1812, he was awarded the Order of the Dannebrog's Cross of Honour.
