= Justicia =

Justicia may refer to:

- Justicia (album), by Eddie Palmieri, 1969
- Justicia (Madrid), a ward in the Madrid city center
- Justicia (plant), a genus of flowering plants in the family Acanthaceae
- Justicia mayor, a 19th century Spanish Empire law enforcement and judicial officer
- SS Justicia, a British ship
- "Justicia", a 2018 song by Silvestre Dangond and Natti Natasha
- Justicia, the main sculpture at the Glorieta de las mujeres que luchan, in Mexico City
- "Justicia" (Agents of S.H.I.E.L.D.: Slingshot)

== People ==
- Justicia Acuña (1893–1980), Chilean engineer
- Pepe Justicia (born 1960), Spanish flamenco guitarist
- Jorge Rojas Justicia (born 1983), Spanish footballer

== See also ==
- Justitia (disambiguation)
- Justiciar
