= Carl Hieronimus Gustmeyer =

Danish merchant

Carl Hieronimus Gustmeyer (9 June 1701 – 28 December 1756) was a Danish merchant.

== Early life and career ==
Gustmeyer was born in Stralsund, the son of Georg Gustmeyer. It is not known when he came to Denmark but he was granted citizenship in Copenhagen in 1740. His timber business grew to become one of the largest in the city and he was also active as a broker. He was highly respected by his peers and he was elected as auditor at Kurantbanken and as first director of the Royal Iceland Company.

== Personal life and legacy ==
Gustmeyer married Catharina Sprich (c. 1710–1773) on 3 October 1742 in St. Peter's Church in Copenhagen. She continued the trading house after his death in 1756. Frederik Bargum became a partner in the company after marrying their daughter. Bargum founded Det guineiske Kompagni in 1765 but had to flee the country in 1774.

The trading house was then taken over by Gustmeyer's son, Frederik Ludolf Gustmeyer (1752–1804), who became a member of Grosserer-Societetet, a wholesaler organization. He owned the Gustmeyer House at Ved Stranden 14 where he kept a large household.
