= Jens Jensen Berg =

Danish ship captain and businessman (1760–1813)

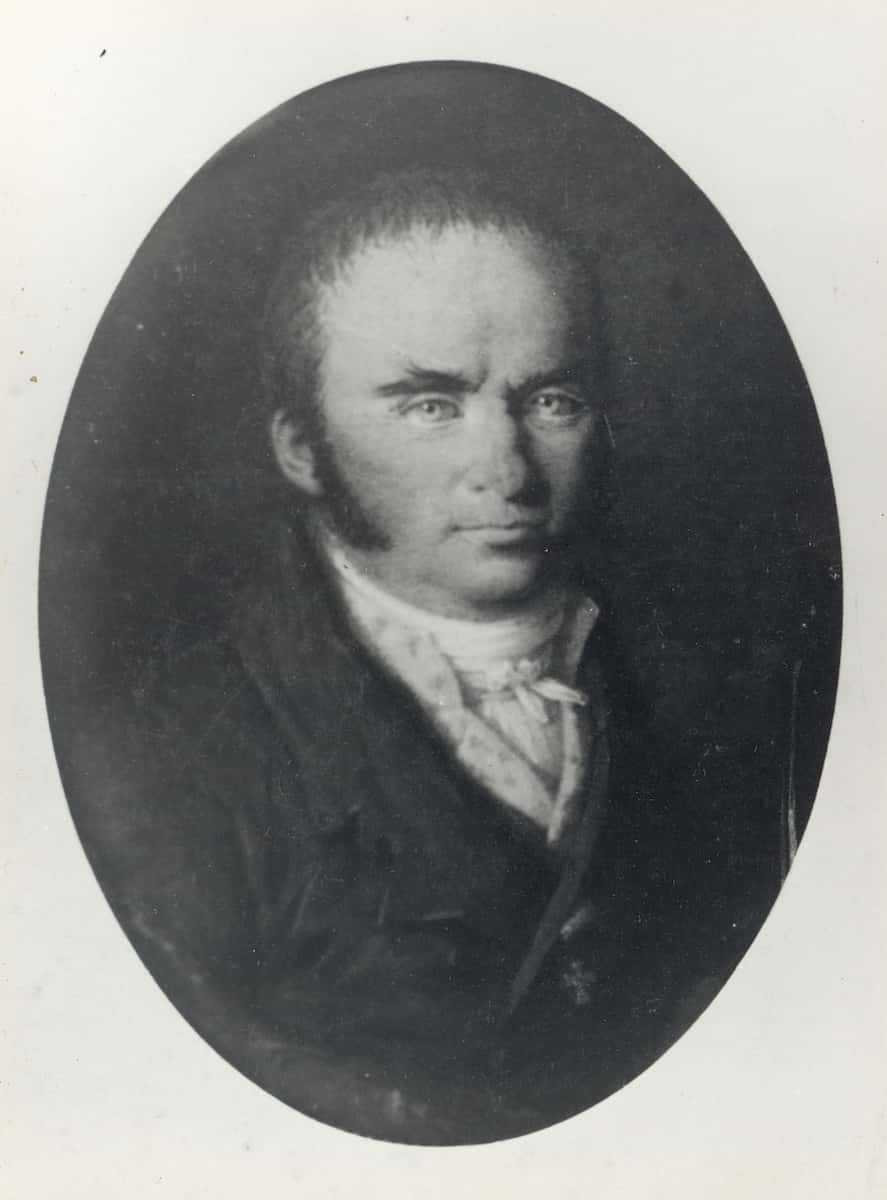
Jens Jensen Berg.

Jens Jensen Berg (29 September 1760 – 29 July 1813) was a Danish ship captain and businessman. He participated in the Triangle Trade. In the 1790s, he created an unrealized plan for improved cultivation and trade on the Danish Gold Coast.

== Early life and education ==
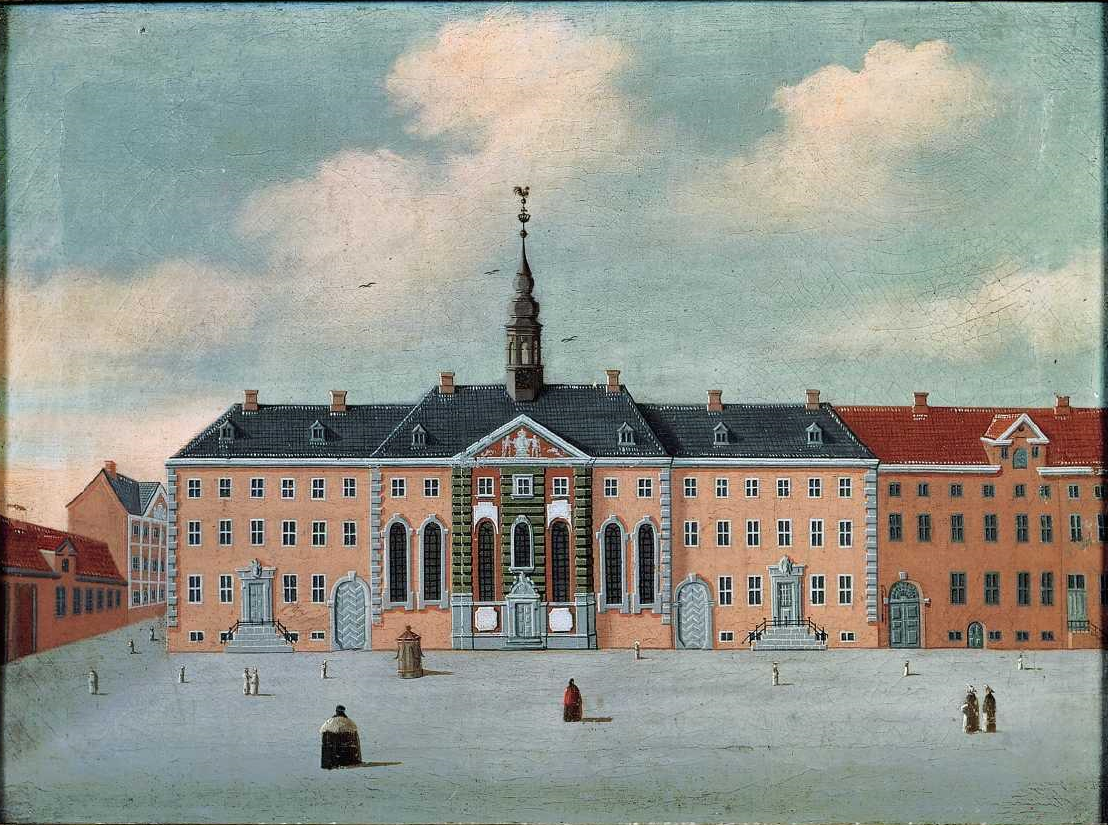
The Royal Wajsen House on Nytorv in Copenhagen where Berg lived as a child..

Berg was born on 29 September 1760 in Saltum as the son of artisan smith (kunstsmed) Jens Hansen and Maren Westrup. He lost both his parents as an infant. His confirmation took place on 23 February 1772 in Saltum. After that, he was admitted to the Royal Wsjsen House (orphan age) in Copenhagen, where he won the attention of the inspectors, Christian Frederik Ursin and Poul Egede. He was subsequently afforded free admission to the Navigational School, passing his navigational exams in 1776.

== Career at sea ==
In 1776, he completed his first voyage to the Danish West Indies (under Capt. Morum). After another voyage to the Danish West Indies, he joined one of the Danish Asiatic Company's ships on a voyage to Canton by way of Tranquebar. The expedition lasted 20 months. He then spent around a year in the internal European trade, visiting ports in France, Spain and the netherlands. It was followed by another voyage to the Danish West Indies which saw him promoted to Sailing Master (overstyrmand).

In 1782, Berg joined the Danish Guinea–West Indies Company. He made the journey to the Danish Gold Coast in the company's frigate Christiansborg. He spent the next year as captain of a schooner, sailing up and down the coast, purchasing around 1,400 enslaved Africans. In 1774, he captained a slave ship to Saint Domingue.

In 1785, he became captain of Christiansborg. He sailed from the Danish Gold Coast on 7 October 1786 with a cargo of 452 enslaved Africans. Two days later, in the early morning hours, a slave rebellion broke out on board the ship. After three hours, Berg and his men managed to regain control of the ship. 34 of the enslaved Africans were killed. No crew members were killed but the Sailing Master (overstyrmand) and ship's doctor were seriously injured. The ship's doctor Paul Isert would later describe the events in a book published in 1788. The book contained fierce criticism of the trans-Atlantic slave voyages as well as slavery in general.

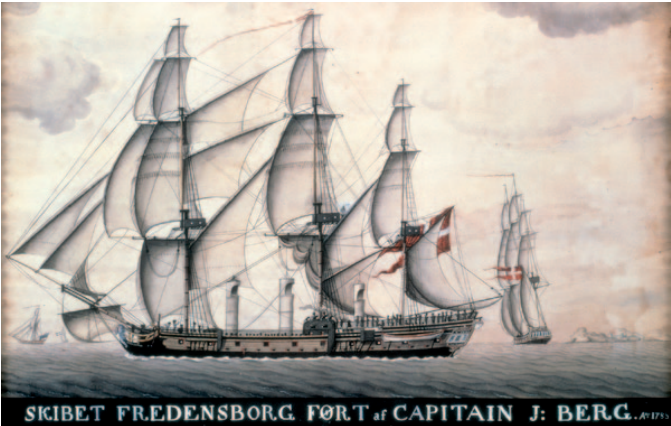
The Fredensborg in 1788.

In 1788, Berg was appointed as captain of Fredensborg. The Fredensborg continued after around a year at the Danish Gold Coast to Saint Croix in the Danish West Indies witgh a cargo of 301 enslaved Africans. From there, it returned to Copenhagen with a cargo of raw sugar.

Berg's next employment was on land. In his capacity of ekvipagemester for a local shipping company in Copenhagen, he was responsible for the maintenance and fitting-out of the company's ships as well as overseeing its shipyard, warehouses and ropewalk.

In 1791, Berg was appointed as captain of Duntzfelt& Co.'s frigate Grev Schimmelmann on a voyage to the East Indies. The ship called at Madras and Calcutta and the Nicobar Islands before returning to Copenhagen three years later. In 1795–1796, he returned to India in the same ship.

In 1795, together with Duntzfelt & Co., Berg acquired the decommissioned naval frigate HDMS Hvide Ørn (1784). In 1796, he captained her on a voyage to Tranquebar and other ports in the area. The expedition was an economic success, allegedly foctupling the invested capital.

== Later years in Copenhagen ==
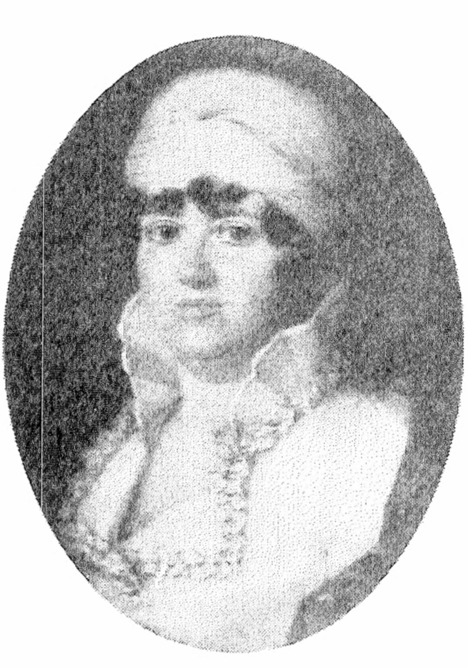
:Vigoline Berg, née Machold.

After this voyage, Berg decided to stay in Copenhagen. He was licensed as a wholesaler (grosserer) and was also active as a commission agent. He was also able to buy a sugar refinery in Helsingør and made investments in more ships.

In 1794, Berg had married Vigoline Christine Machholt (1768–1768) She was a daughter of Frederik Macholt (1735–1797) and Sophie Hedvig Muusberg (died c. 1772). Her father was employed as Provisions Inspector at Queen Sophia Magdalena's court. The couple had a daughter, Vigoline, and a son, Christian Macholt (1769-). Berg bought a house at the corner of Bredgade and Dronningens Tværgade (now Dronningens Rværgade 3). During the first bombardment of Copenhagen in 1801, he was hit by great losses. During the Gunboat War, he made a number of unsuccessful investments in privateering vessels. He was created a Knight in the Order of the Dannebrog. He died in 1813 and is buried at Assistens Cemetery.
