= Frederik Bargum =

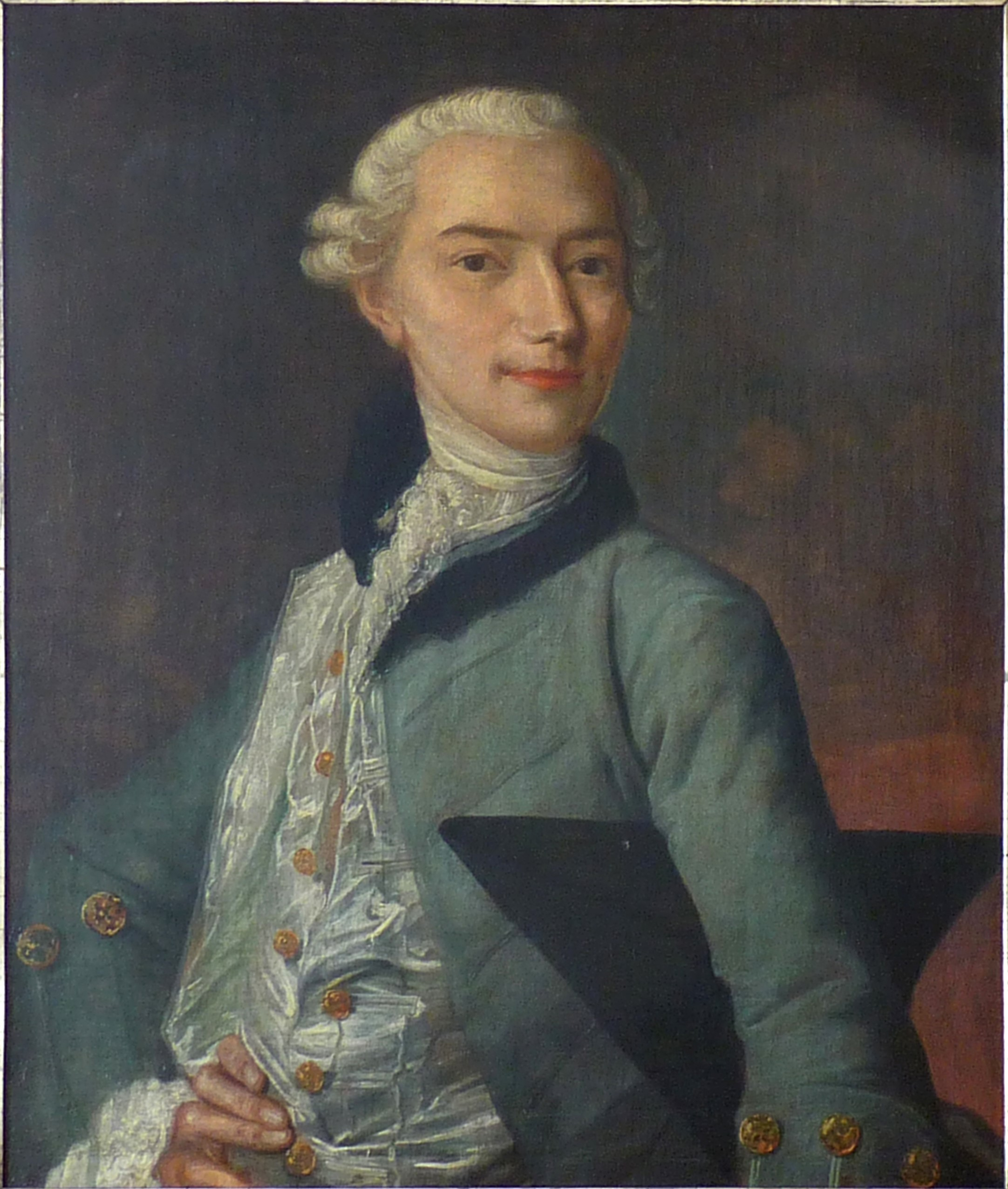
- Portrait of Bargum by unknown artist
- Born: 1737; Copenhagen, Denmark
- Died: 1813 (aged 75–76); Paris, France
- Occupations: Merchant, slave trader

Henning Frederik Bargum (9 October 1733 – 1813) was a Danish merchant and slave trader. The Yellow Mansion, his former home at Amaliegade 18 in Copenhagen, is now home to the Lord Chamberlain's Office.

== Early life ==
Bargum was born in Copenhagen, the son of textile merchant Thomas Carstensen Bargum (c. 1696–1754) and Marie Rebekka Sprich (c. 1703–81). His father was originally from Tønder County. His maternal aunt was married to timber merchant and broker Carl Hieronymus Gustmeier.

== Career ==
Bargum joined Gustmeier's company at an early age. It was responsible for major deliveries of timber for the Royal Danish Navy. In 1755, Bargum was sent abroad to purchase timber for the navy. Two years later he was granted a monopoly of the Danish tobacco trade from the crown for the price of one barrel of gold a year. As of 31 December 1760, he was granted the title Tobacco Director General (generaltobaksdirektør). The new monopoly was poorly received both by the magistrate and the general population. A protest against Bargum was published on the door of the Church of Holmen, and the head of police had to guarantee that commoners would still have access to the same quality of tobacco for one skilling as had been the case before. Bargum was also involved in a controversy with the General Customs Authority (generaltoldkammeret) and the tobacco monopoly was ceded to Peter Borre in March 1761.

Bargum then acquired a hat factory in Copenhagen from a Frenchman named Douilhac. He was at this point also a manufacturer of fish meal.

Bargum was also a driving force behind the establishment of Det danske Guineiske Kompagni. From his travels in England, France, and the Netherlands, he had become familiar with the huge profitability of the slave trade. On 18 March 1765, he was granted a 20-year monopoly on slave trade from the Danish Gold Coast and on 1 November that same year a royal concession on the fortresses of Christiansborg and Fredensborg. The business plan was to purchase gold, ivory, and slaves on the Danish Gold Coast, then sell the slaves in the Danish West Indies and return with raw sugar to Denmark. Three ships were initially acquired. Two of them were named Christiansborg and Fredensborg after the Danish fortresses on the Guinea Coast. A combined sugar refinery and warehouse was also established at the Børs Dock in Copenhagen. Gustmeier was initially a partner in the enterprise but left it soon thereafter. The company went bankrupt in 1775.

Bergum had fled the country the previous year. He lived in Vienna in 1782 and Alsace in 1784. He later moved to Paris.

== Personal life ==
Bargum married Barbara Eleonora Gustmeier on 15 December 1762 in St. Peter's Church in Copenhagen. She was a daughter of merchant Carl Hieronimus Gustmeyer (died 1756) and Catarina Gustmeyer née Sprich (died 1773).

Bargum constructed the Yellow Mansion at Amaliegade 18 in Copenhagen in 1759–1764. The house was designed by Nicolas-Henri Jardin. He also purchased a piece of land in Frederiksberg in 1765 and subsequently constructed the country house Forhåbningsholm.
