= Catarina Gustmeyer =

Catarina Gustmeyer (1710–1773) was a Danish businessperson and slave trader.

After the death of her husband Carl Hieronimus Gustmeyer in 1756, she inherited his company, which had the privilege of delivering wood fuel to the royal court. She belonged to the elite of the Danish business world. In 1771, she was one of only three women to pay tax as merchants in Copenhagen, and in 1772 one of three women members of the Grosserer-Societetet (GS).

In 1772, she was rich enough to send her private merchant fleet to Danish West Indies with relief help after a hurricane. She founded the Det danske Guineiske Kompagni ("Danish Guinea Company") (dealing in among other things slaves) in companionship with her son-in-law Frederik Bargum.
