= HDMS Justitia (1777) =

Royal Dano-Norwegian Navy Ship

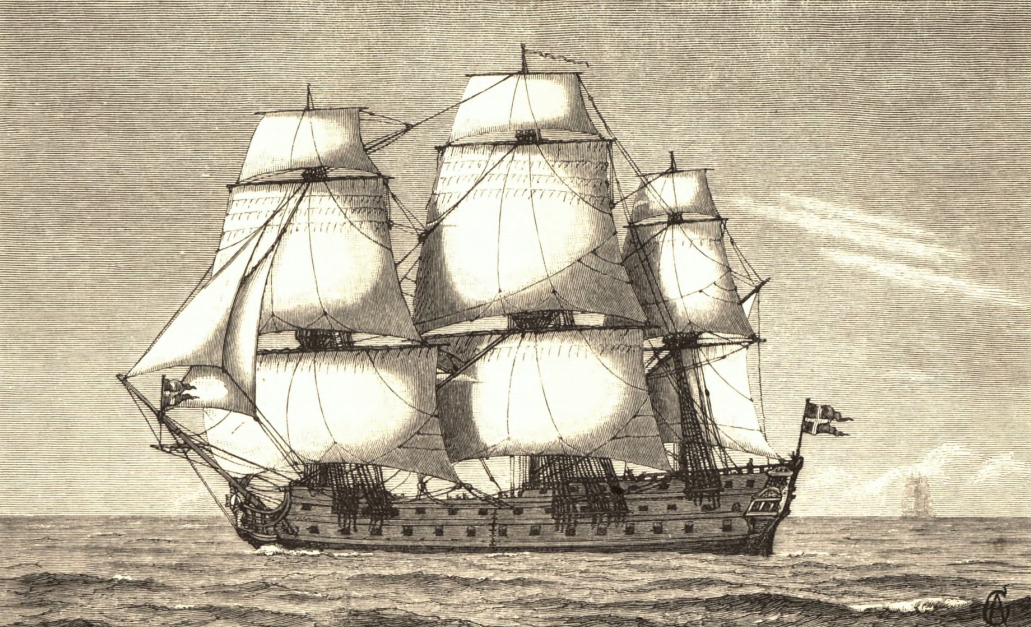
- Illustration of Justitia

History

Denmark & Norway
- Name: Justitia
- Namesake: Justitia
- Builder: Henrik Gerner, Nyholm, Copenhagen
- Laid down: 8 June 1776
- Launched: 2 September 1777
- Commissioned: 1780
- Out of service: 1807
- Fate: Captured by the Royal Navy at the Battle of Copenhagen

General characteristics
- Class & type: Prindsesse Sophia Frederica Class ship of the line
- Sail plan: Full-rigged ship

United Kingdom
- Name: Justitia
- Acquired: By capture by the British at second Battle of Copenhagen (1807)
- Fate: Broken up 1817

General characteristics (British service)
- Tons burthen: 175811/94 (bm)
- Length: Overall: 174 ft 3 in (53.1 m); Keel: 124 ft 2 1/2 in (37.9 m)
- Beam: 47 ft 10 1/2 in (14.6 m)
- Depth of hold: 19 ft 9 in (6.0 m)
- Complement: 590
- Armament: Lower deck: 28 × 32-pounder guns; Upper deck: 28 × 18-pounder guns; QD: 4 × 12-pounder guns + 2 × 32-pounder carronades; Fc: 2 × 12-pounder guns + 2 × 32-pounder carronades; Round house:6 × 18-pounder carronades

HDMS Justitia was a 72-gun ship of the line of the Royal Dano-Norwegian Navy built to a design by Henrik Gerner. Although launched in 1777, she was not fully commissioned until 1780. The Royal Navy captured her together with most of the Dano-Norwegian navy after the battle of Copenhagen in 1807. The British never commissioned Justitia. A renaming to Orford in 1809 was cancelled. She was broken up in 1817.

== HDMS Justitia (1777) ==
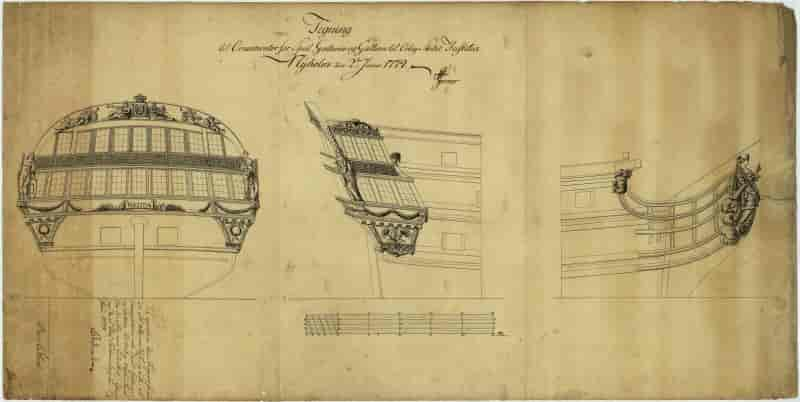
Illustration of Justitia by Henrik Gerner.

HDMS Justitia served in the home fleet based in Copenhagen for the whole of its active life in the Danish navy, when new acting as flagship to the admiral commanding the home squadron. (Note: A total of twenty-three Danish officers are recorded in the two volumes by Topsøe-Jensen and Marquand as serving at some time on the Justitia, always in the home squadron, covering the years 1780 to 1800.) Her captains and admirals include

- Admiral on the flagship Justitia - Vice Admiral Carl Friderich de Fontenay (1781 and 1782). (Note: Vice Admiral C.F. de Fontenay was the son of Admiral Gaspard Frédéric le Sage de Fontenay who had served on the earlier ship-of-the-line HDMS Justitia (1707) in 1723)
- Flag captains on Justitia - Hans Georg Krog (1780), Johan Peter Wleugel (1782),
- Captains when Justitia was not the flagship - Hans Schiønnebøl (1781), Anton Friderich Lützow (1789), and Svend Martin Ursin (1800).
- In 1786 Lorentz Henrik Fisker was second in command of Justitia in the home squadron
- In 1788 Commodore Just Bille put forward proposals for the testing of the new 36 pound cannon in HDMS Justitia. These trials took place in June and July 1788, with Poul de Løvenørn as the official observer.
- In 1788 Peder Janus Bording was Captain of HDMS Justitia in the home squadron which served alongside the Russian squadron involved with the Russo-Swedish War (1788–1790) commanded by the Russian vice admiral von Dessen. In August of that year Justitia accompanied ship-of-the-line Lovisa Augusta and the frigate Møen on a secret mission to the North Sea (for which details are lacking!), and later on artillery trials.

Justitia does not appear to have been involved in the 1801 battle of Copenhagen but was present at the 1807 battle when the majority of the Danish fleet was surrendered to the British. At that point the Royal Danish Navy struck her from the lists.

== HMS Justitia ==
Justitia was one of the many ships the Royal Navy captured after the battle. She arrived at Portsmouth on 5 December 1807 and then was laid up.

== Fate ==
The "Principal Officers and Commissioners of His Majesty's Navy" first offered Justitia, of 74 guns and 1758 tons, for sale and breaking up in July 1814. The successful purchaser had to give a bond to complete the breaking up within one year. However she did not sell.

In February 1817 the Navy used her for experiments with Robert Seppings diagonal braces. She was then broken up at Portsmouth in March 1817.
