= Peter Schiønning =

Danish naval officer and diarist

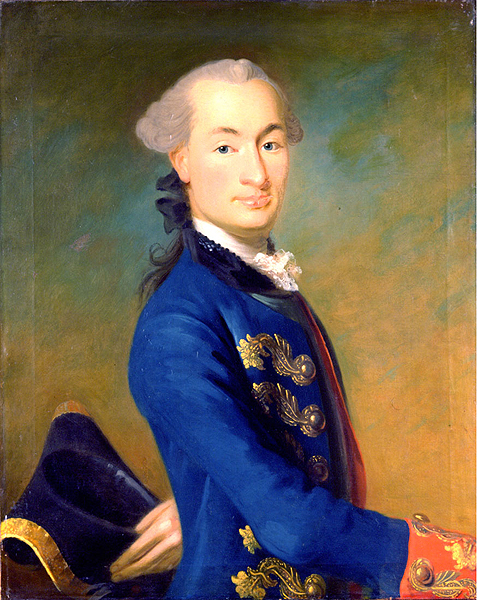
Peter Shciørring.

Peter Christian Schiønning (15 August 1732 - 7 August 1813) was a Danish naval officer. His diary provides a detailed first hand account of the life of a Danish naval officer in the second half of the 18th century.

== Early life and education ==
Schiønning was born on 15 August 1732 in Copenhagen, the son of renteskriver Peter Schiønning (1691 –1745) and Anna Leth (c. 1696–1766). Six of his 12 siblings survived to adulthood.

Schiønning enrolled at the Naval Cadet Academy in November 1746. In 1750, he received his first training at sea, on board the naval training ship Dockquen.

== Career ==
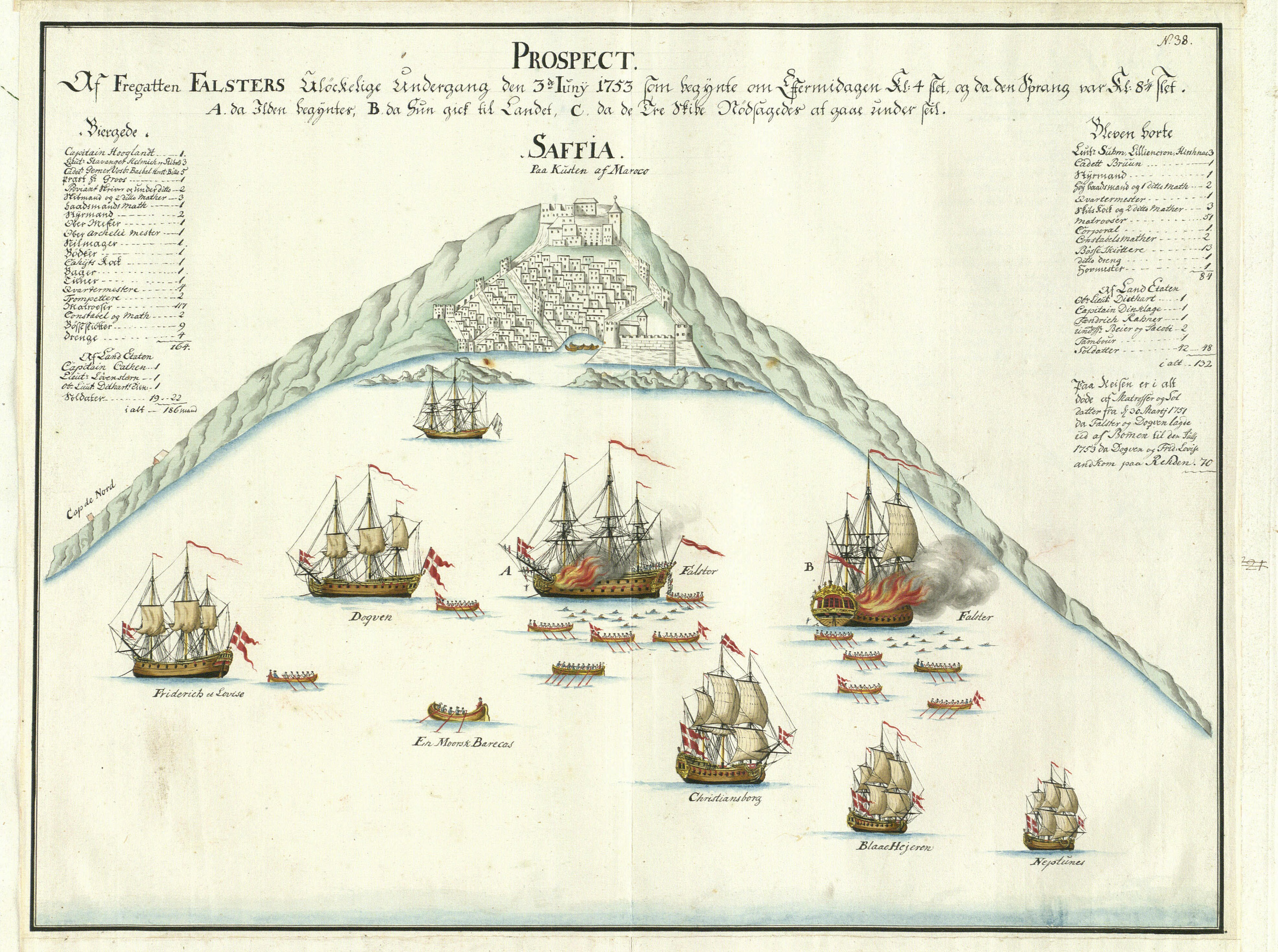
The fire of the Falster at Safi, 1753. The Christiansborg is seen the foreground.

In 1752–53, Schiønning was sent to the Mediterranean with the frigate Christiansborg. He was thus present when HDMS Falster exploded off Safi, Morocco. In 1755, he became a junior lieutenant. He was later promoted through the ranks from senior lieutenant (1758) to captain lieutenant (1763) and captain (1769).

In 1770–71, he captained the guard ship Hvide Ørn at Helsingør. In 1771, still as captain of the Hvide Øn, he was sent to Bornholm and Christiansø with a commission tasked with solving a dispute with the local residents over the payment of extra taxes.

In 1773, Shoønning became captain of the frigate Søeridderen. In 1779, he captained the frigate Christiansø Both ships were part of a squadron under the command of vice admiral Carl de Fontenay.

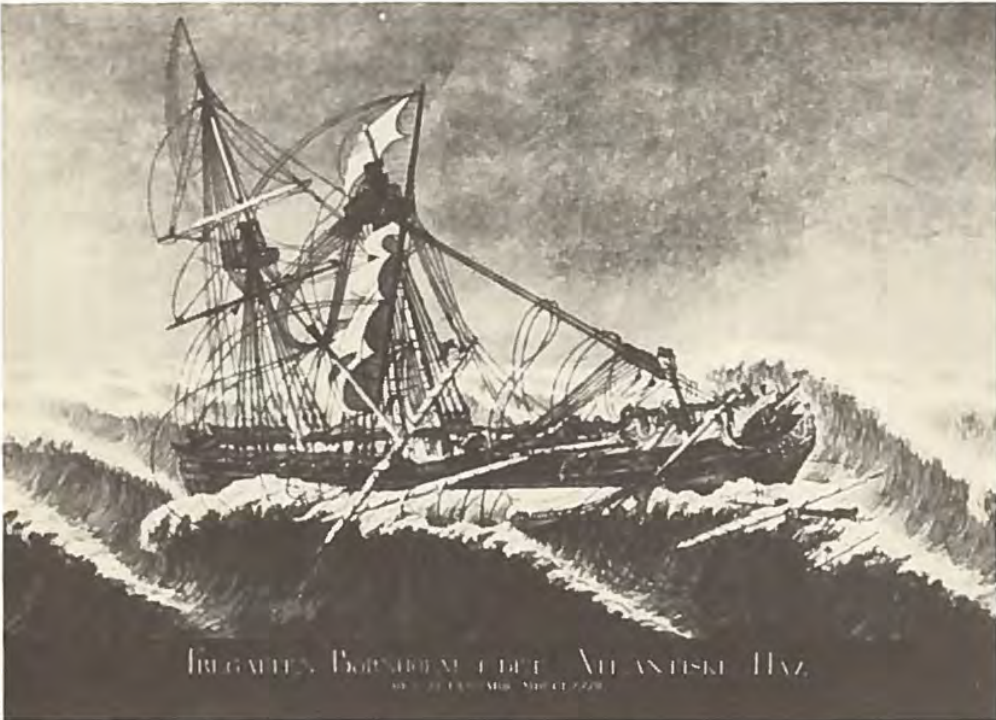
Bornholm in the Atlantic Ocean.

In 1780, he took command of the frigate Bornholm. He was first tasked with escorting the annual tribute ship to Algier.Schiønning's visit to Algier lasted from 11 to 28 May. From there he continued to the Danish West Indies where he protected merchant ships during the North American War of Independence. In October, he managed to save his ship by urgently leaving port when a hurricane was about to hit the islands.

In December, when he was escorting a convou of 10 Danish merchant ships from Guadeloupe to Staint Thomas, he was stopped by three British corvettes, which demanded to search the Danish ships. The claim was initially rejected by Schoønning. the British ships opened fire when Schiønnig again the day after refused their request for visitation. After Schiønning had fiven in to their demands, after seeing his ship badly damaged, the British ships turned out to be privateers, which took of with the Danish merchant ships. Upon his return to Copenhagen, in April 1881, Schiønning was court-martialled for his conduct. In November, he was sentenced to bannishment from the navy.In 1786 he tried unsuccessfully to get the case reopened. In 1799, he was awarded a pension.

== Personal life ==
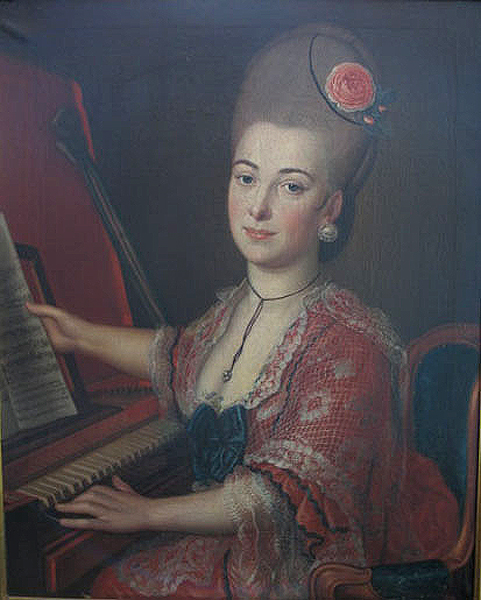
Marie Christine von Nägler 1775 by Beenfeldt.

Schiørring was married to Maria Christina von Nägler (1755-1827) on 9 October 1772 in Helsingør. She was the daughter of colonel-lieutenant Jeremias von Nägler (c. 1723–1804) and Sophia Elisabeth Bruun (c. 1733–99). They had a son and two daughters; the son did not survive childhood.

After receiving his sentence, Schiønning moved to Vordingborg. He later moved back to Copenhagen. He is buried at Copenhagen's Assistens Cemetery.

Schiønning's vast personal archives were later presented the Copenhagen University Library. They are now in the collection of the National Library of Denmark. The archives comprise a wide range of diabries, journals, essays, letters and poetry. His diary (+1,000 pages)m entitled Strøtanker), provides a detailed first-hand account of the life of a Danish naval officer in the second half of the 18th century.

Schiønning's Song Book (Schiønnings Visebog) is a collection of 93 Spanish songs, mostly written in the first half of the 18th century, compiled by Schiønning. Many of the songs are not known from other sources.
