= Johanne Seizberg =

Danish artist, illustrator, and teacher

Johanne Seizberg (1732–1772) was a Danish artist, drawing artist, and illustrator, and a teacher.

Probably born in Augsburg in Germany, She was daughter of the printer Riedlinger and married Lieutenant Simon Philippinus Nerius Seizberg.

From 1754, she was a student of the artist couple Frants Michael Regenfuss and Margaretha Ludwig. She illustrated the Auserlesne Schnecken, Musscheln und andere Schaalthiere (1758), and the Flora Danica (1761). In 1762, she became a teacher in the art school for female students protected by the Royal Danish Academy of Fine Arts. In 1772, the school was closed after the fall of Johann Friedrich Struensee.
