= 1737 in Norway =

- Centuries: 16th; 17th; 18th; 19th; 20th
- Decades: 1710s; 1720s; 1730s; 1740s; 1750s
- See also: 1737 in Denmark; List of years in Norway

Events in the year 1737 in Norway.

== Incumbents ==
- Monarch: Christian VI.

== Events ==
- Korskirken's School for the Poor in Bergen is founded.
- The first Moravian Church congregations in Norway is established in Christiania.

== Births ==
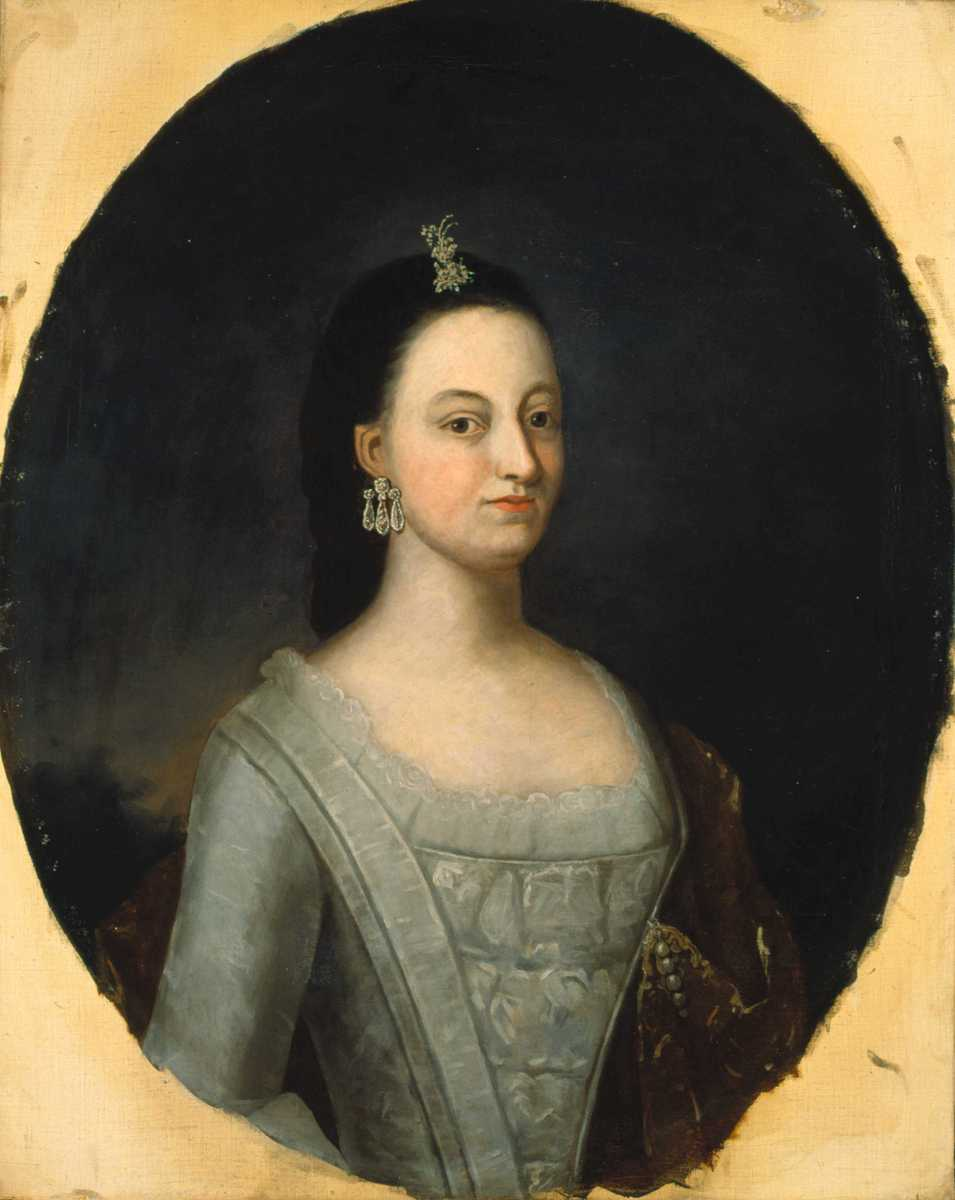
Mathia Collett

- 21 February – Christen Heiberg, civil servant, County Governor of Finnmark (d. 1801).
- 22 April – Reier Gjellebøl, priest and writer (died 1803).
- 28 May – Mathia Collett, merchant and businessperson (died 1801).

== Deaths ==
- 19 May – Niels Knagenhielm, civil servant, land owner and non-fiction writer (born 1661).
