= 1660 in Norway =

- Centuries: 17th; 18th; 19th
- Decades: 1640s; 1650s; 1660s; 1670s; 1680s
- See also: 1660 in Denmark; List of years in Norway

Events in the year 1660 in Norway.

== Incumbents ==
- Monarch: Frederick III.

== Events ==
- January - Swedish forces laid siege to the town of Halden.
- 22 February - The siege of Halden ends, and the Swedish forces retreat to Bohuslen.
- 27 May - Trondhjems len was returned to Norway, following the Treaty of Copenhagen (after having been ceded to Sweden at the Treaty of Roskilde in 1658).
- 8 December - Ove Bjelke became Chancellor of Norway.
- 24 December - Claus von Ahlefeldt was appointed commander-in-chief of the Norwegian army.
- Flekkefjord is given town status as a ladested.

== Births ==
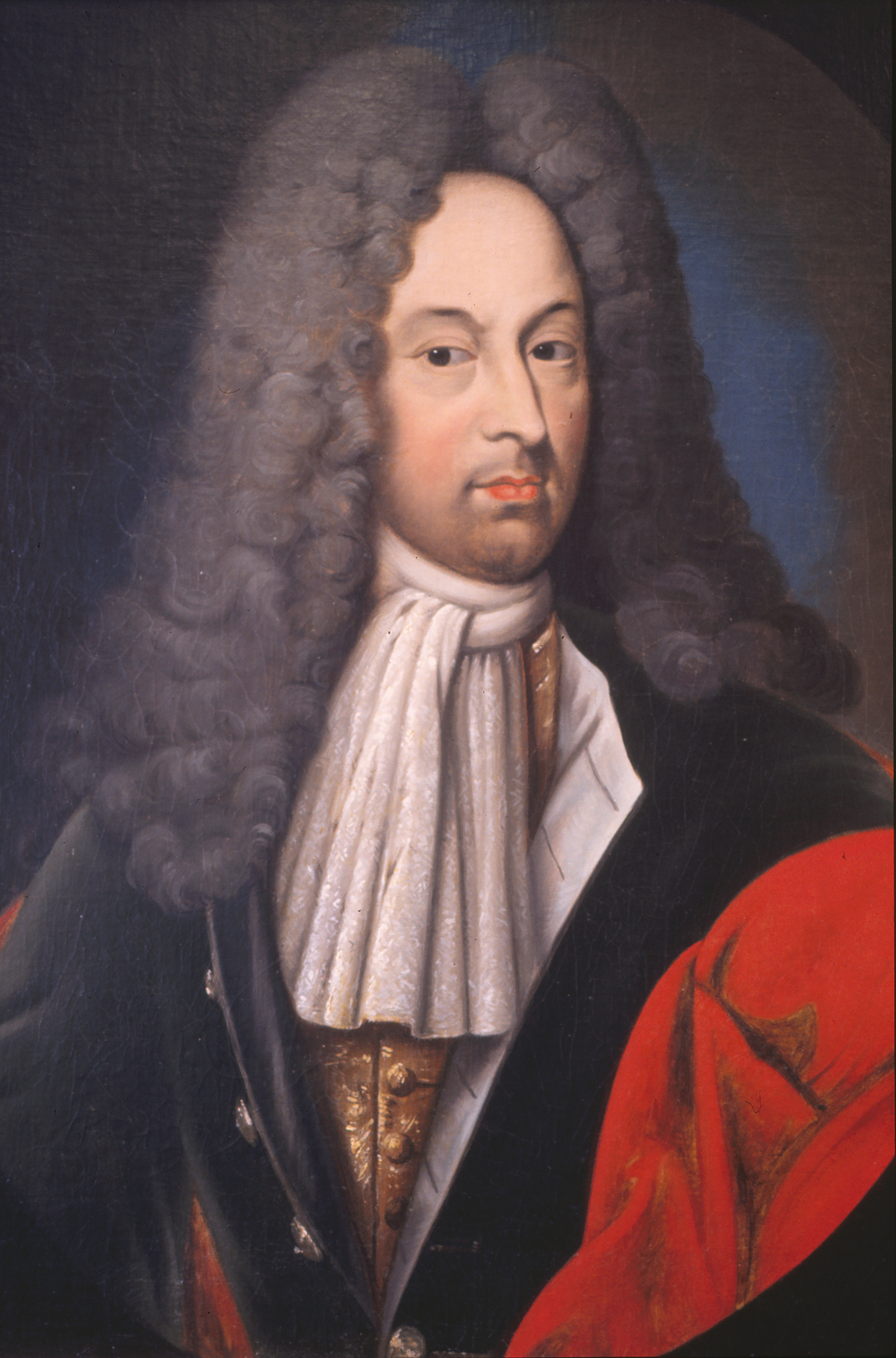
Albert Angell

- 4 November – Albert Angell, civil servant, landowner and businessperson (died 1705).
- Vincens Budde, military officer (died 1729).
- Henrik Adeler, civil servant and politician (died 1718).

=== Probable ===
- Ragnhild Abelset, merchant, landowner and lensmann (died 1733).
