= 1733 in Norway =

- Centuries: 17th; 18th; 19th; 20th
- Decades: 1710s; 1720s; 1730s; 1740s; 1750s
- See also: 1733 in Denmark; List of years in Norway

Events in the year 1733 in Norway.

== Incumbents ==
- Monarch: Christian VI.

== Events ==
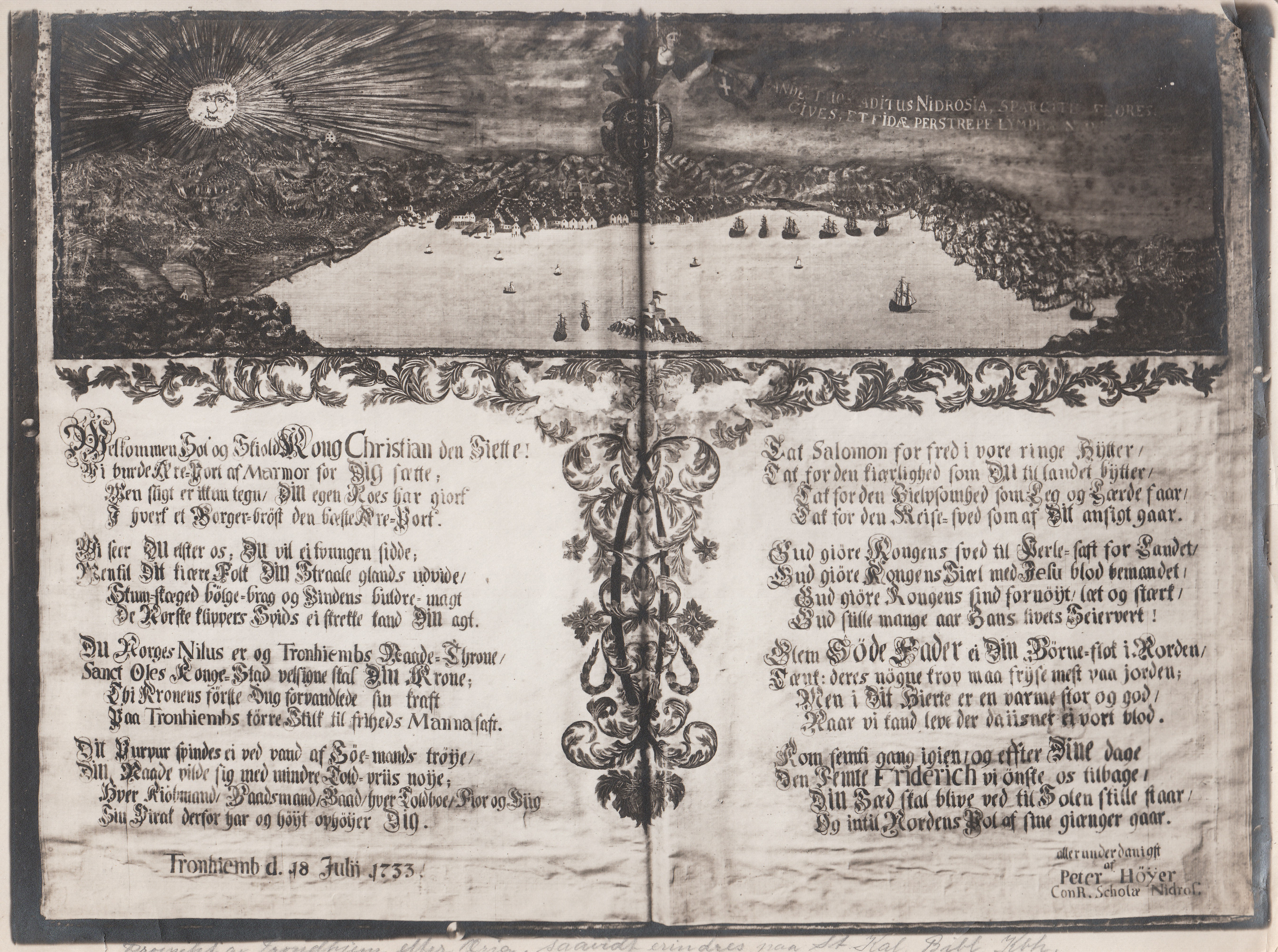
Engraving of poem/speech by Peter Höyer held on Christian VI's and his queen arrival to the city of Trondheim.

- 18 July – Christian VI travelled to Trondheim. A poem/speech by Peter Höyer was performed in his honor when he visited the city.
- The Commanding Major Generals South of Dovre is dissolved, and the leadership of the Norwegian Army is once again unified under a single commanding general (Patroclus Rømeling).

== Arts and literature ==
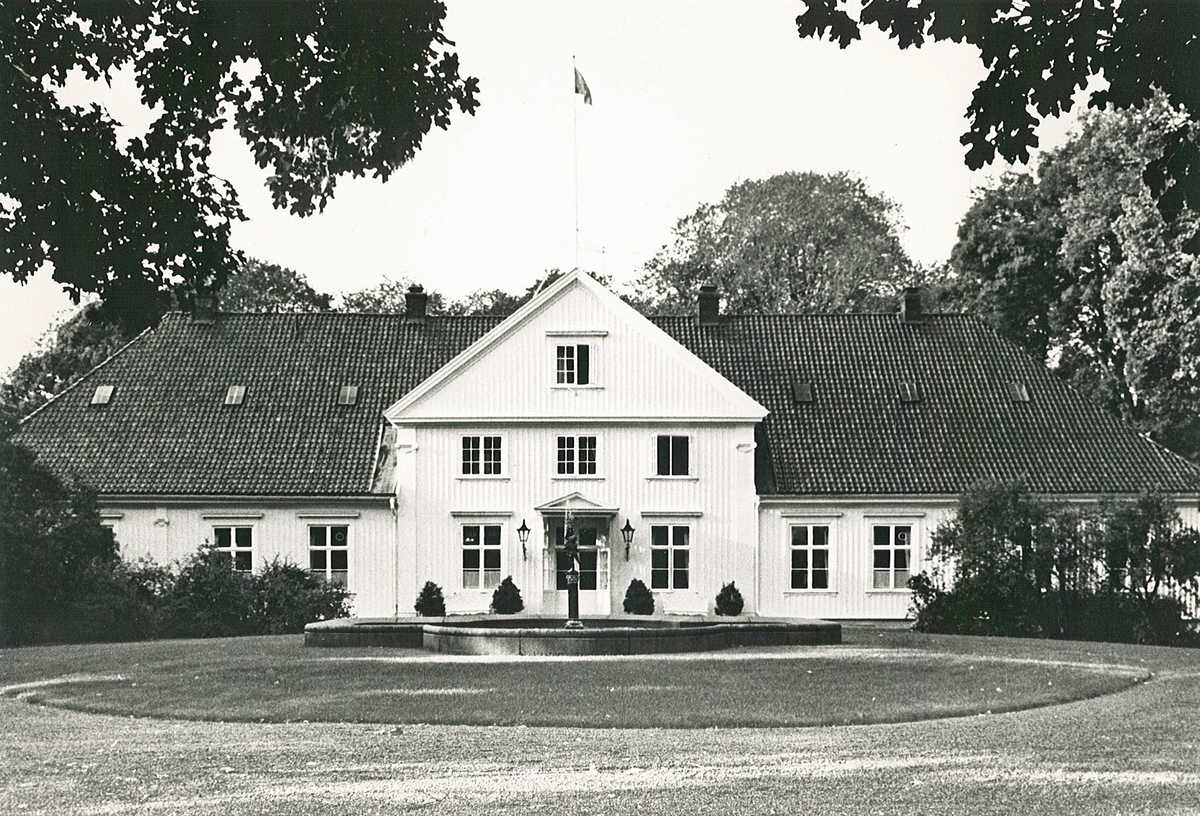
Bygdøy Royal Estate

- Construction of Bygdøy Royal Estates main building is complete.

== Births ==
- 16 June – Halvor Blinderen, farmer (died 1804).
- 18 October – Arent Greve, painter and goldsmith (died 1808).

== Deaths ==
- Ragnhild Abelset, merchant, landowner and lensmann (born 1660).
