= 1657 in Norway =

- Centuries: 16th; 17th; 18th; 19th
- Decades: 1630s; 1640s; 1650s; 1660s; 1670s
- See also: 1657 in Denmark; List of years in Norway

Events in the year 1657 in Norway.

== Incumbents ==
- Monarch: Frederick III.

== Events ==
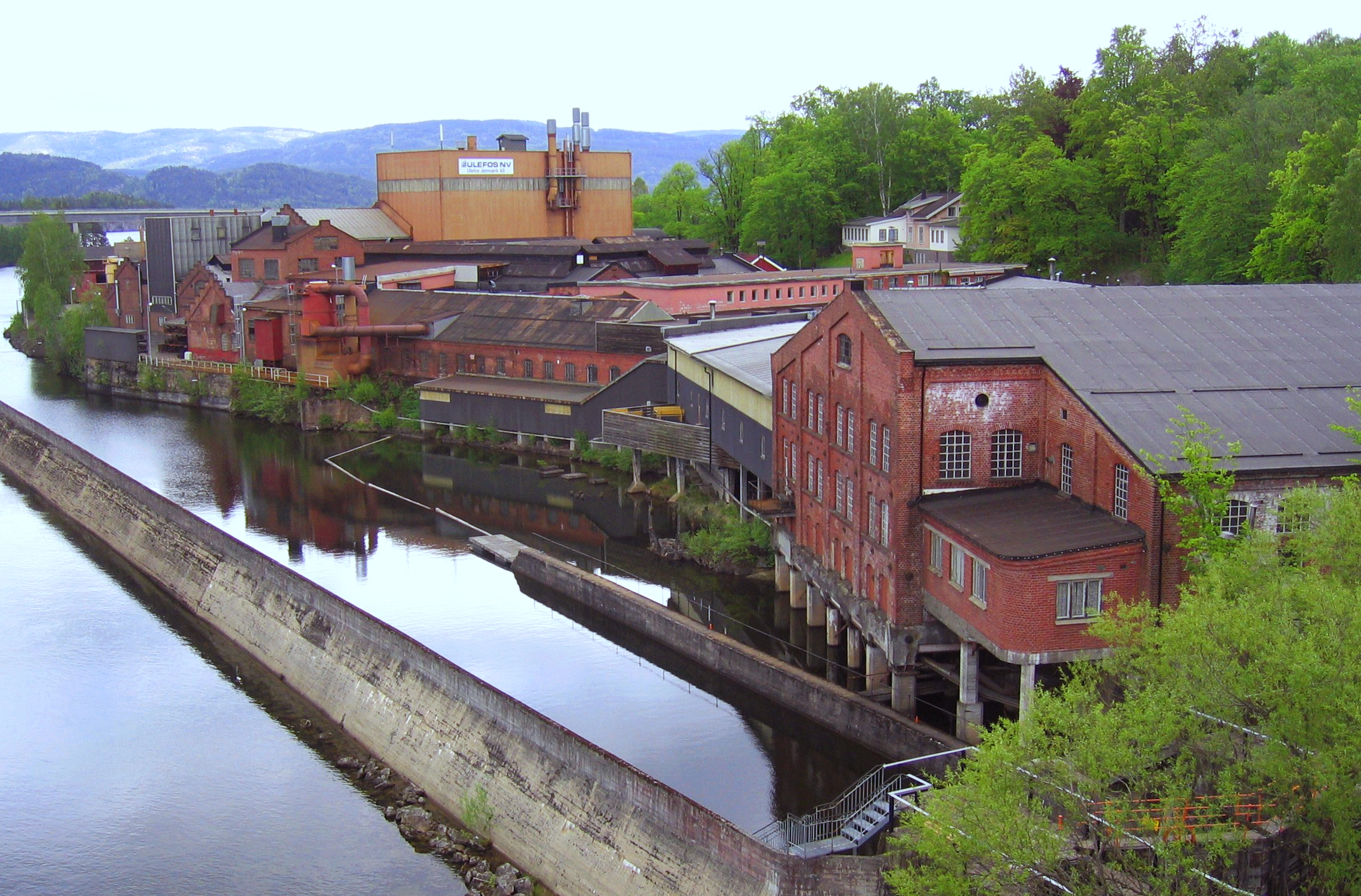
Ulefos Jernværk

- January – Iver Krabbe was appointed commander-in-chief of the Norwegian army, the first non-Stattholder of Norway to hold the position.
- June 5 – The Dano-Swedish War (1657–58), in Norway called Krabbekrigen (named after Iver Krabbe) starts.
- September 27 – Norwegian troops fought in the Battle of Hjärtum.
- Oppland Regiment is formed.
- Ulefos Jernværk is established.
