= 1741 in Norway =

- Centuries: 16th; 17th; 18th; 19th; 20th
- Decades: 1720s; 1730s; 1740s; 1750s; 1760s
- See also: 1741 in Denmark; List of years in Norway

Events in the year 1741 in Norway.

== Incumbents ==
- Monarch: Christian VI.

== Events ==
- 13 January - Conventicle Act of 1741 is introduced.

== Arts and literature ==
- Ludvig Holbergs satirical science-fiction/fantasy novel «Niels Klim's Underground Travels» is first published.

== Births ==
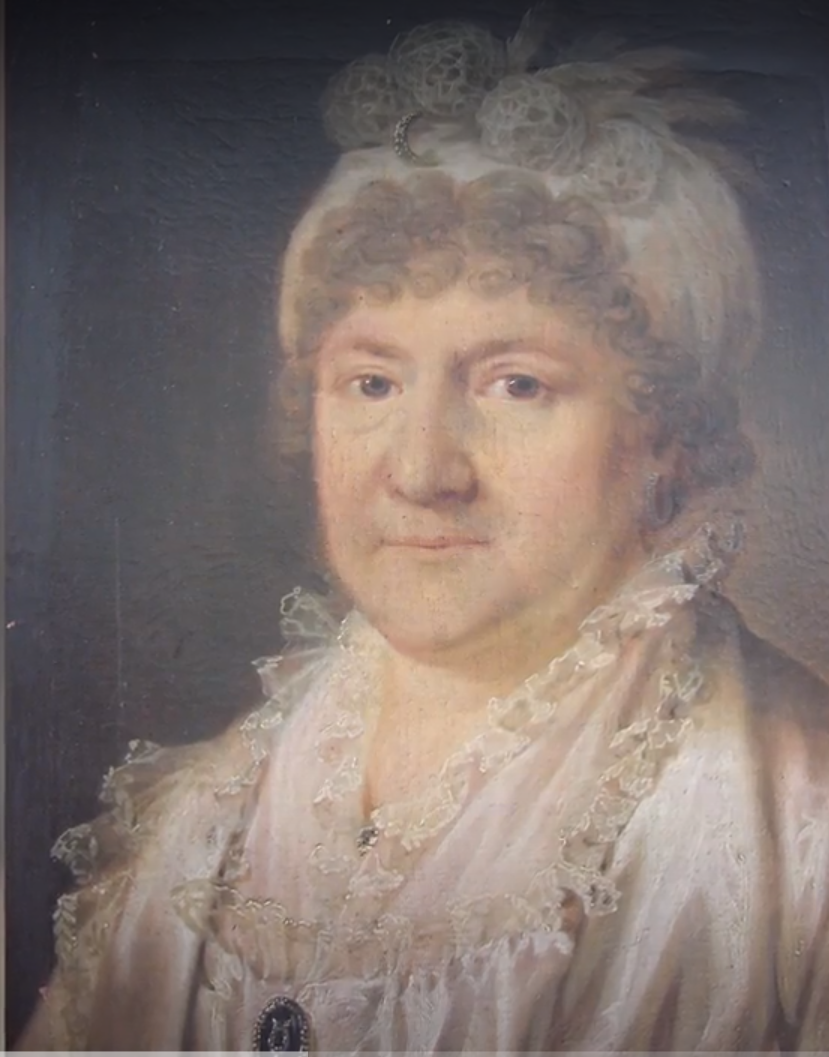
Martha Wærn

- 22 April – Martha Wærn, philanthropist (died 1812).
- 9 May – Hugo Fredrik Hjorthøy, priest and topographic writer (died 1812).
- 13 May – Ingeborg Akeleye, noblewoman (died 1800).
