= 1747 in Norway =

- Centuries: 16th; 17th; 18th; 19th; 20th
- Decades: 1720s; 1730s; 1740s; 1750s; 1760s
- See also: 1747 in Denmark; List of years in Norway

Events in the year 1747 in Norway.

== Incumbents ==
- Monarch: Frederick V.

== Events ==
- Oluf Borch was ennobled, and given the noble family name de Schouboe.

== Arts and literature ==
- 18 October - Høydalsmo Church was consecrated.
- Øye Church was built.

== Births ==
- 14 April - Peder Jørgen Cloumann, bailiff and representative at the Norwegian Constituent Assembly (died 1817)
- 17 November - Carsten Anker, businessman, civil servant and politician (died 1824)
