= 1729 in Norway =

- Centuries: 16th; 17th; 18th; 19th; 20th
- Decades: 1700s; 1710s; 1720s; 1730s; 1740s
- See also: 1729 in Denmark; List of years in Norway

Events in the year 1729 in Norway.

== Incumbents ==
- Monarch: Frederick IV.

== Events ==
- 9 August - Brita Alverns witch trail, one of the last witch trials in Scandinavia.

== Deaths ==
- Vincens Budde, military officer (born 1660).
