= Christen Michelsen Heggelund =

Danish merchant

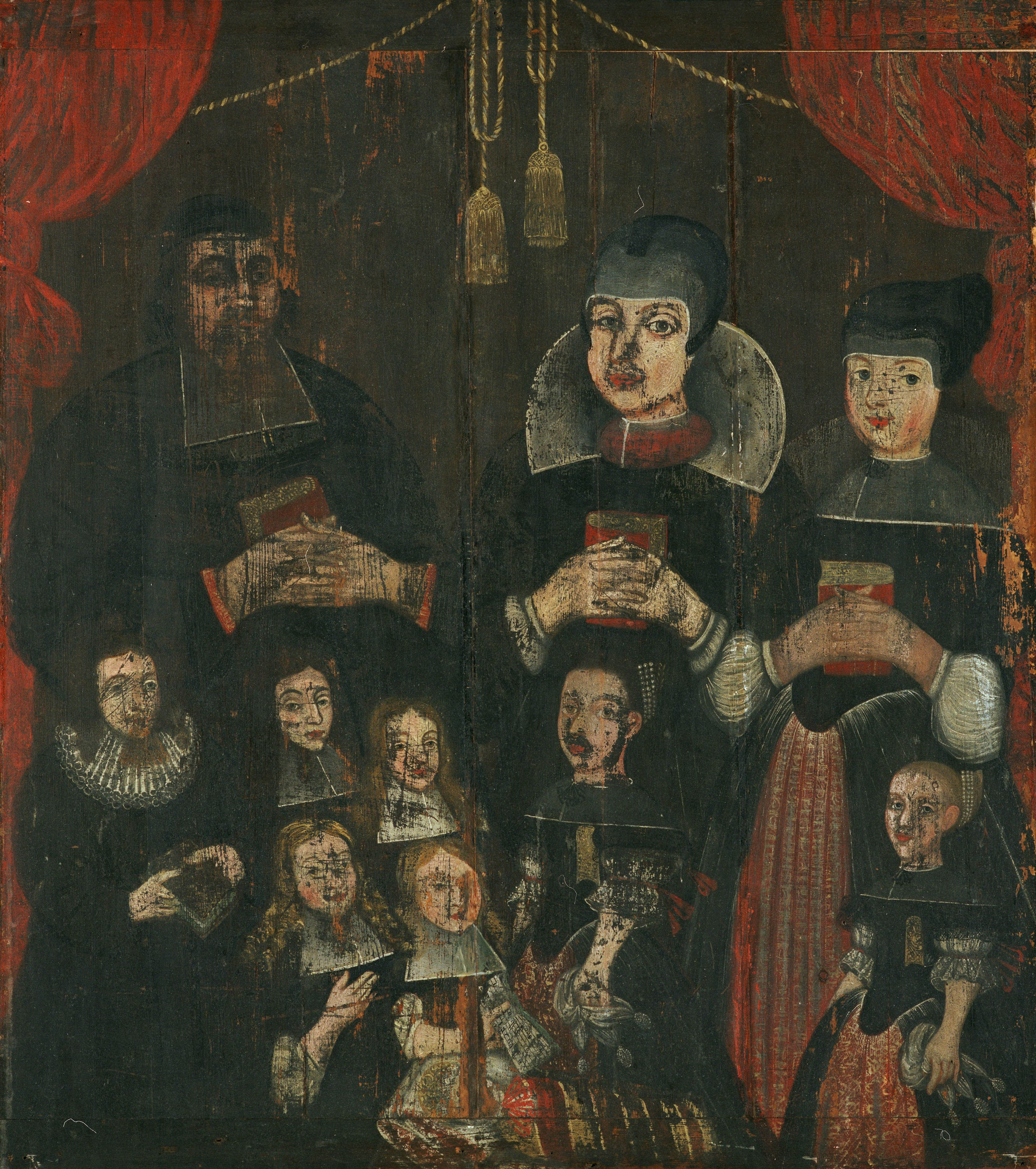
- Born: ca. 1619; Ebeltoft, Denmark–Norway
- Died: 1694; Skjervøy, Denmark–Norway
- Occupation: Merchant
- Spouses: Karen Andersdatter, Maren Jørgensdatter (née Carstens)
- Children: Christen Heggelund, Michel Heggelund, Anders Heggelund, Else Christensen, Jørgen Heggelund, Christian Heggelund, Else Erichsen

Christen Michelsen Heggelund, also known as Skjervøykongen (lit. 'King of Skjervøy') was a Danish merchant who established the trading post at Skjervøy in Troms, Norway.

He was born in the town of Ebeltoft in Jylland, Denmark. He gained citizenship in Bergen on the 15th of August 1661, and traveled north to the island of Skjervøy the very same year. Heggelund gained permission from the priest to establish a trading post on the island. It has been debated that Heggelund gained permission to contribute to the building and decorating of the new church against certain requirements.

According to the tributary poem Nordlands Trompet by priest Petter Dass, the priest in Skjervøy eventually went into debt with Heggelund.

== The treasure of Skjervøykongen ==
According to local legend Heggelund was a greedy man and when he was close to his death he dumped all of his riches into a cave by Stussnes, so that his descendants could not claim them. Many have dreamed of finding the treasure but it is said that a curse will be put on you if you go looking for it.

This legend inspired the Norwegian Arctic Philharmonic Orchestra's Performance Skjervøykongen. In the first season of the tv-series Forbannelsen – Uhkádus sent by NRK, Stian "Staysman" Thorbjørnsen and Sámi TV Personality Ole Rune Hætta visited the island to search for the treasure.
