= 1739 in Norway =

- Centuries: 17th; 18th; 19th; 20th
- Decades: 1710s; 1720s; 1730s; 1740s; 1750s
- See also: 1739 in Denmark; List of years in Norway

Events in the year 1739 in Norway.

== Incumbents ==
- Monarch: Christian VI.

== Events ==
- 6 June - Battle of Jakobshavn (Greenland). The battle led to the consolidation of Danish-Norwegian presence on Greenland.
- Public schools for all children, from the age of seven, are established by law.
- Christian Rantzau is deposed as Steward of Norway, and the position was vacant until 1750.
- The Løvenskiold family were ennobled.

== Arts and literature ==
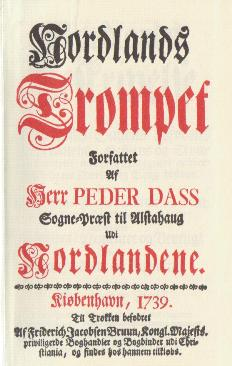
Titlepage of Nordlands Trompet.

- The poem Nordlands Trompet by Petter Dass is published posthumously.

== Births ==
- 10 August – Peder Aadnes, rural painter (died 1792).

=== Full date missing ===
- Nicolai Benjamin Aall, landowner and timber merchant (died 1798).

== Deaths ==
- 1 December – Hartvig Jentoft, merchant (born 1693).
