= 1654 in Norway =

- Centuries: 16th; 17th; 18th; 19th
- Decades: 1630s; 1640s; 1650s; 1660s; 1670s
- See also: 1654 in Denmark; List of years in Norway

Events in the year 1654 in Norway.

== Incumbents ==
- Monarch: Frederick III.

== Events ==
- The Løkken Mine, the largest deposits of pyrite in Norway starts to operate, it is operated from 1654 to 1987.
- The last bubonic plague outbreaks in Norway occur.

== Deaths ==
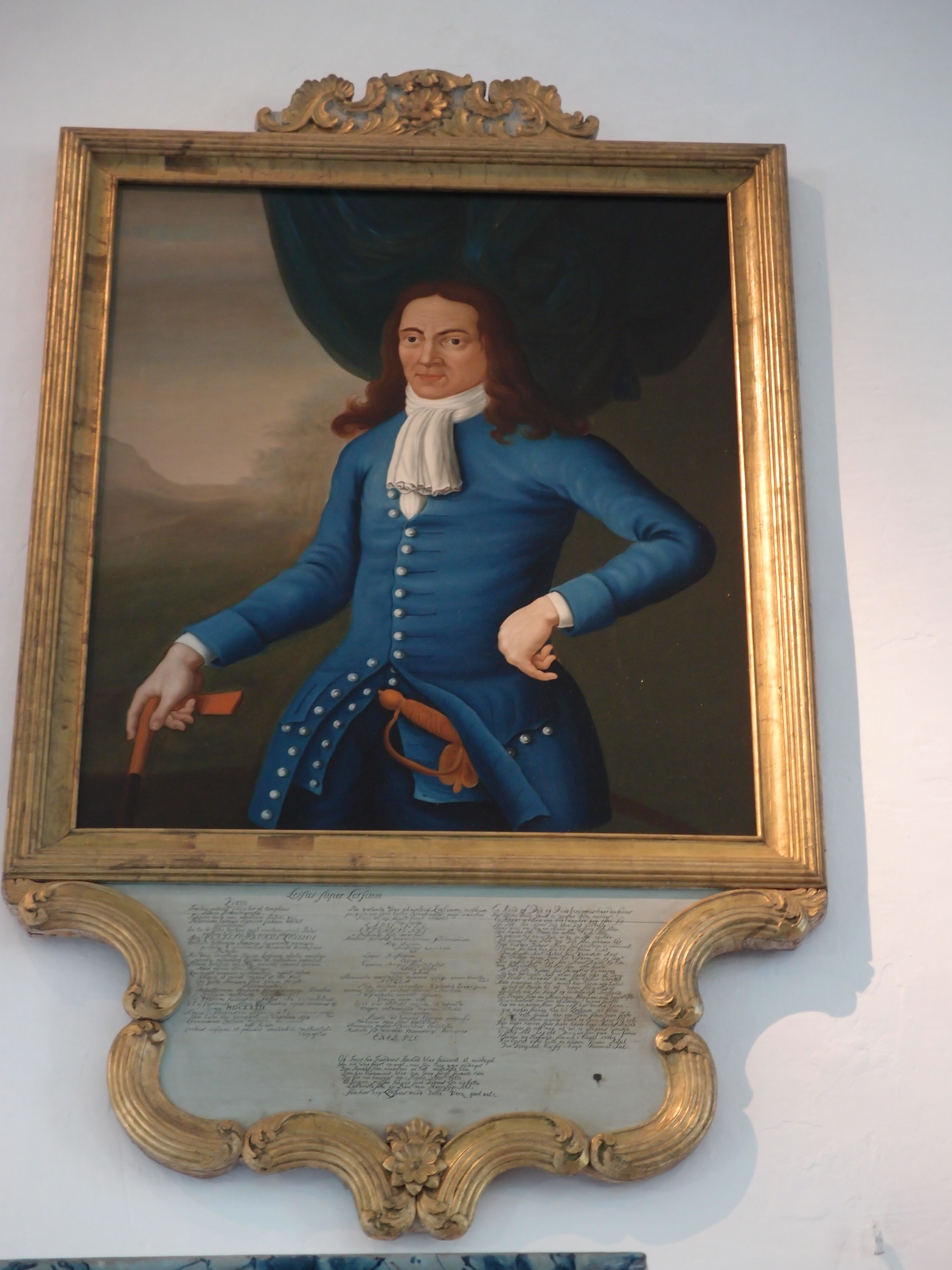
Lorentz Lossius

- Lorentz Lossius, founder of the Røros Copper Works (born in Germany c.1600).
