= 1740 in Norway =

- Centuries: 16th; 17th; 18th; 19th; 20th
- Decades: 1720s; 1730s; 1740s; 1750s; 1760s
- See also: 1740 in Denmark; List of years in Norway

Events in the year 1740 in Norway.

== Incumbents ==
- Monarch: Christian VI.

== Events ==
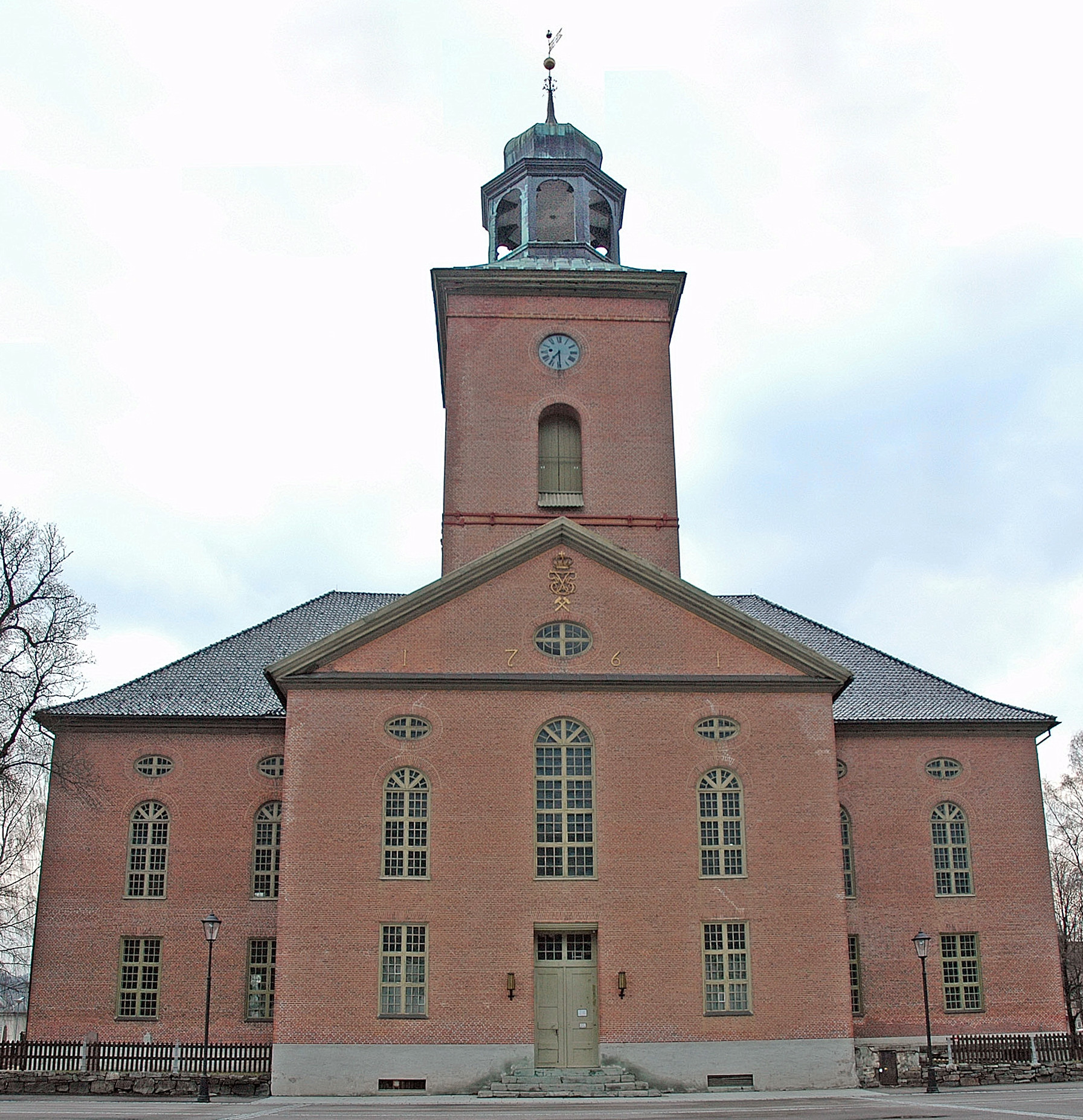
Kongsberg Church

- Construction of Kongsberg Church was initiated.

== Deaths ==
- 18 February – Barthold Nicolai Landsberg, military officer (born c.1668).
