= 1746 in Norway =

- Centuries: 16th; 17th; 18th; 19th; 20th
- Decades: 1720s; 1730s; 1740s; 1750s; 1760s
- See also: 1746 in Denmark; List of years in Norway

Events in the year 1746 in Norway.

== Incumbents ==
- Monarch: Christian VI (until 6 August); then Frederick V.

== Births ==
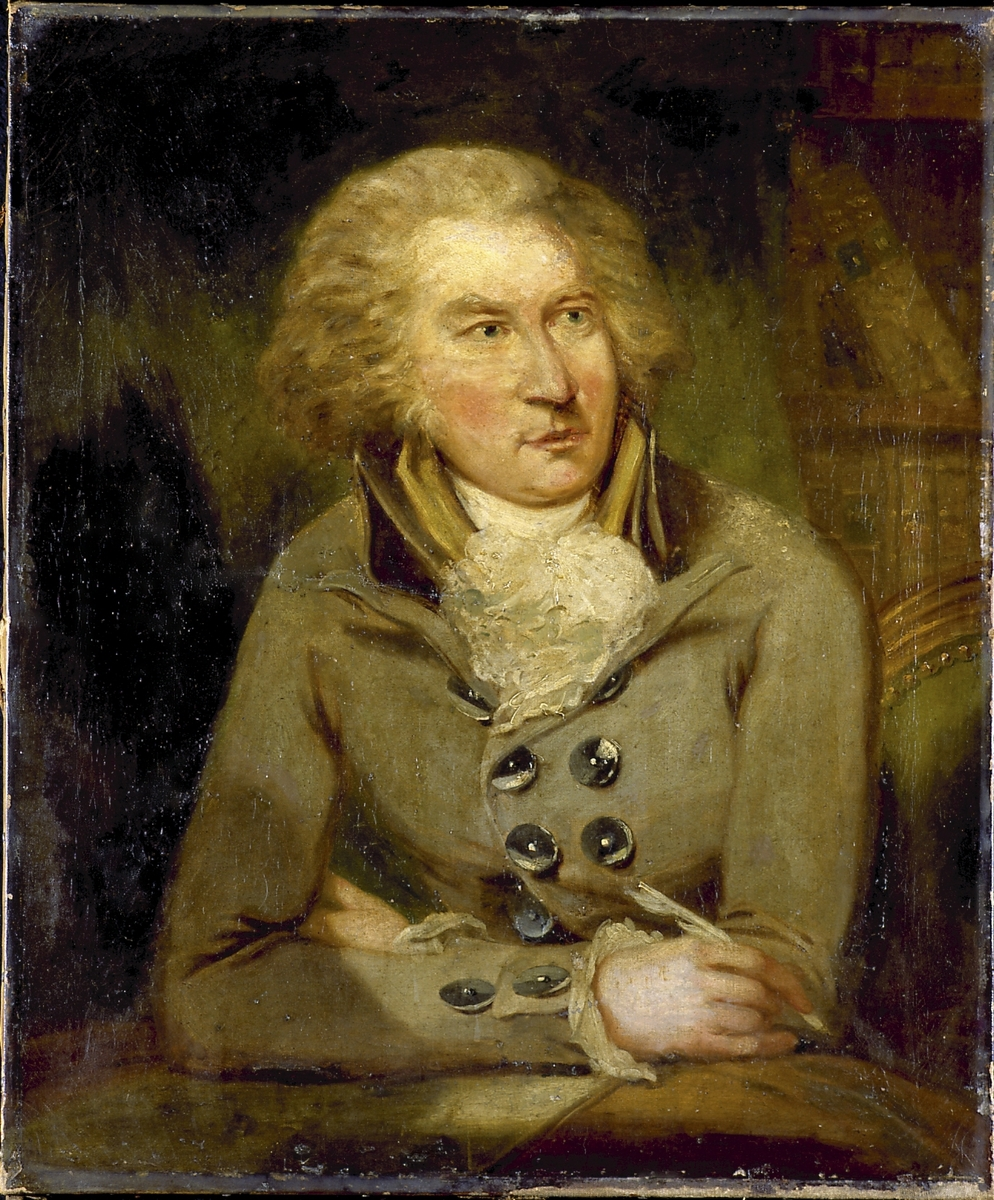
Painting of Bernt Anker, by Carl Frederik von Breda

- 29 October – Claus Fasting, playwright, literary critic, editor and civil servant (died 1791).
- 15 November – Frants Philip Hopstock, priest (died 1824).
- 22 November – Bernt Anker, merchant, chamberlain and playwright (died 1805).
