= 1731 in Norway =

- Centuries: 17th; 18th; 19th; 20th
- Decades: 1710s; 1720s; 1730s; 1740s; 1750s
- See also: 1731 in Denmark; List of years in Norway

Events in the year 1731 in Norway.

== Incumbents ==
- Monarch: Christian VI.

== Events ==
Royal Standard of Denmark-Norway.

- 8 January – An avalanche from the Skafjell mountain causes a massive wave in the Storfjorden fjord, that sinks all boats that happen to be in the water at the time and kills 17 people.
- Christian Rantzau was appointed Governor-General of Norway.
- Denmark–Norway introduces a new Royal Standard flag.

== Births ==
- 20 September – Vilhelm Bornemann, Hudge Advocate General, chief of police and Supreme Court justice (born 1801 in Denmark)

== Deaths ==
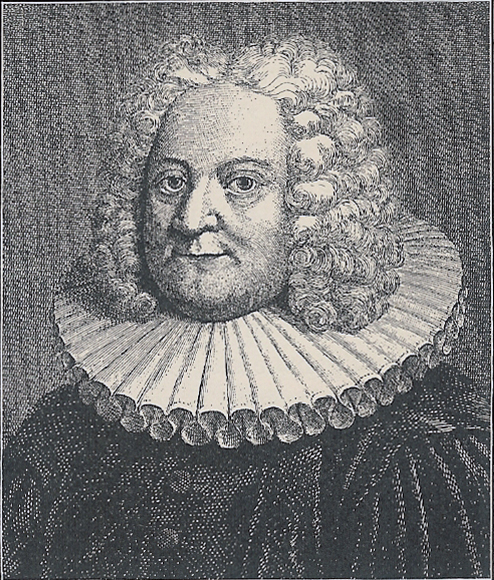
Bartholomæus Deichman

- 16 April – Bartholomæus Deichman, bishop (born 1671).
- 24 May – Peder Krog, bishop (born 1654).
- 5 October – Ditlev Vibe, Governor-general of Norway (born 1670).
