= 1727 in Russia =

Events from the year 1727 in Russia

== Incumbents ==
- Monarch – Catherine I (until May 17), Peter II (from May 17)

== Events ==
- Peter II took a bold step by stripping Menshikov of his titles and exiling him to Siberia and made an important shift in court politics.
- The Treaty of Kyakhta was signed between Russia and China.

== Births ==
- Ivan Ivanovich Shuvalov A Russian statesman, patron of education, co-founder of Moscow University and founder and the first president of the Academy of Fine Arts

== Deaths ==
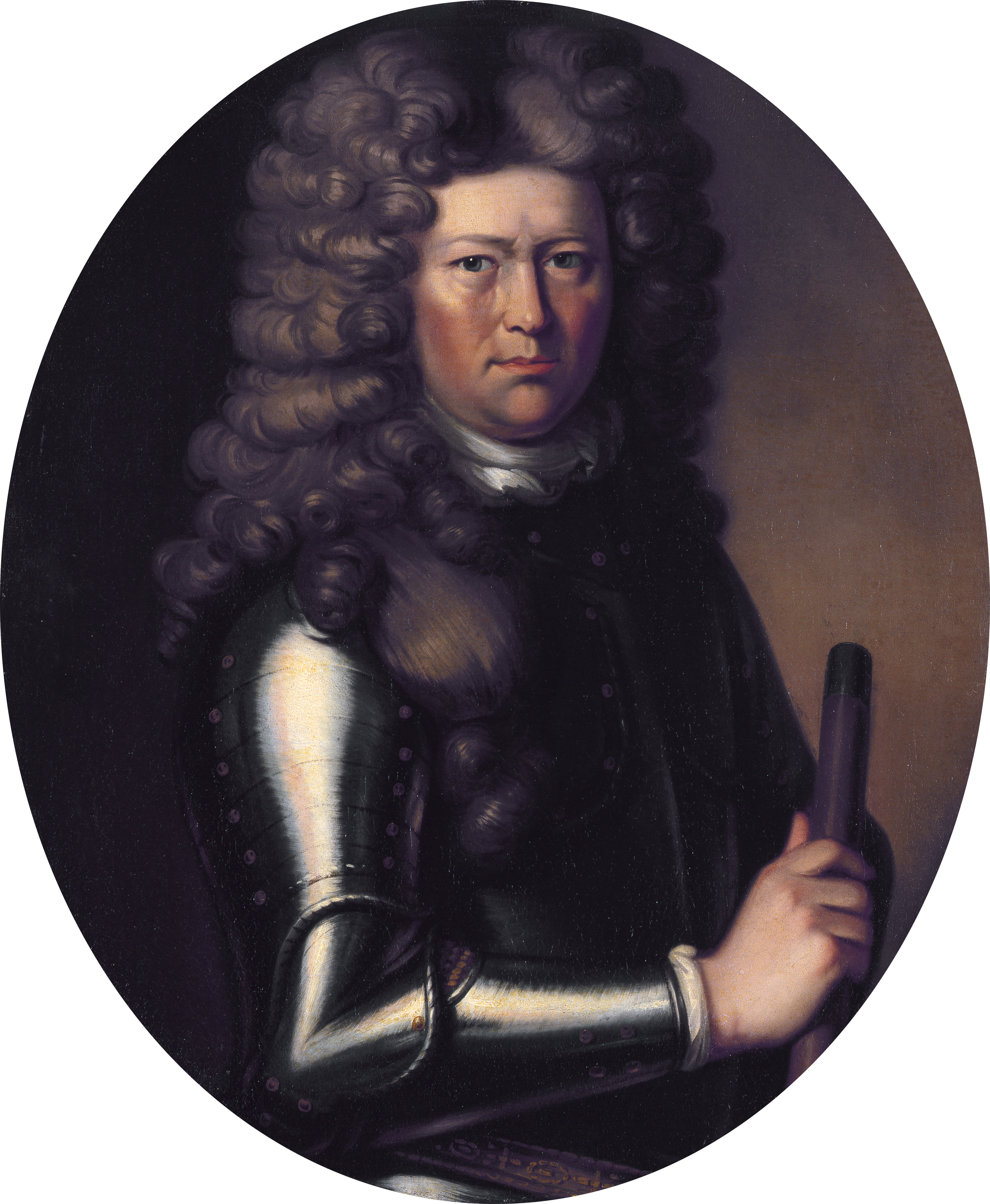
Cornelius Cruys

- 14 June – Cornelius Cruys, Vice Admiral of the Imperial Russian Navy (b. 1655).
- 17 October - Prince Boris Kurakin, Russian diplomat.
- Fyodor Luzhin, Russian geodesist and cartgrapher.

=== Full date missing ===
- Catherine I, monarch (born 1684)
