= 1659 in Norway =

- Centuries: 16th; 17th; 18th; 19th
- Decades: 1630s; 1640s; 1650s; 1660s; 1670s
- See also: 1659 in Denmark; List of years in Norway

Events in the year 1659 in Norway.

== Incumbents ==
- Monarch: Frederick III.

== Events ==
- February - The Second Battle of Frederikshald, Swedish forces fails to take the city.
- Lesja Iron Works is established.

== Births ==
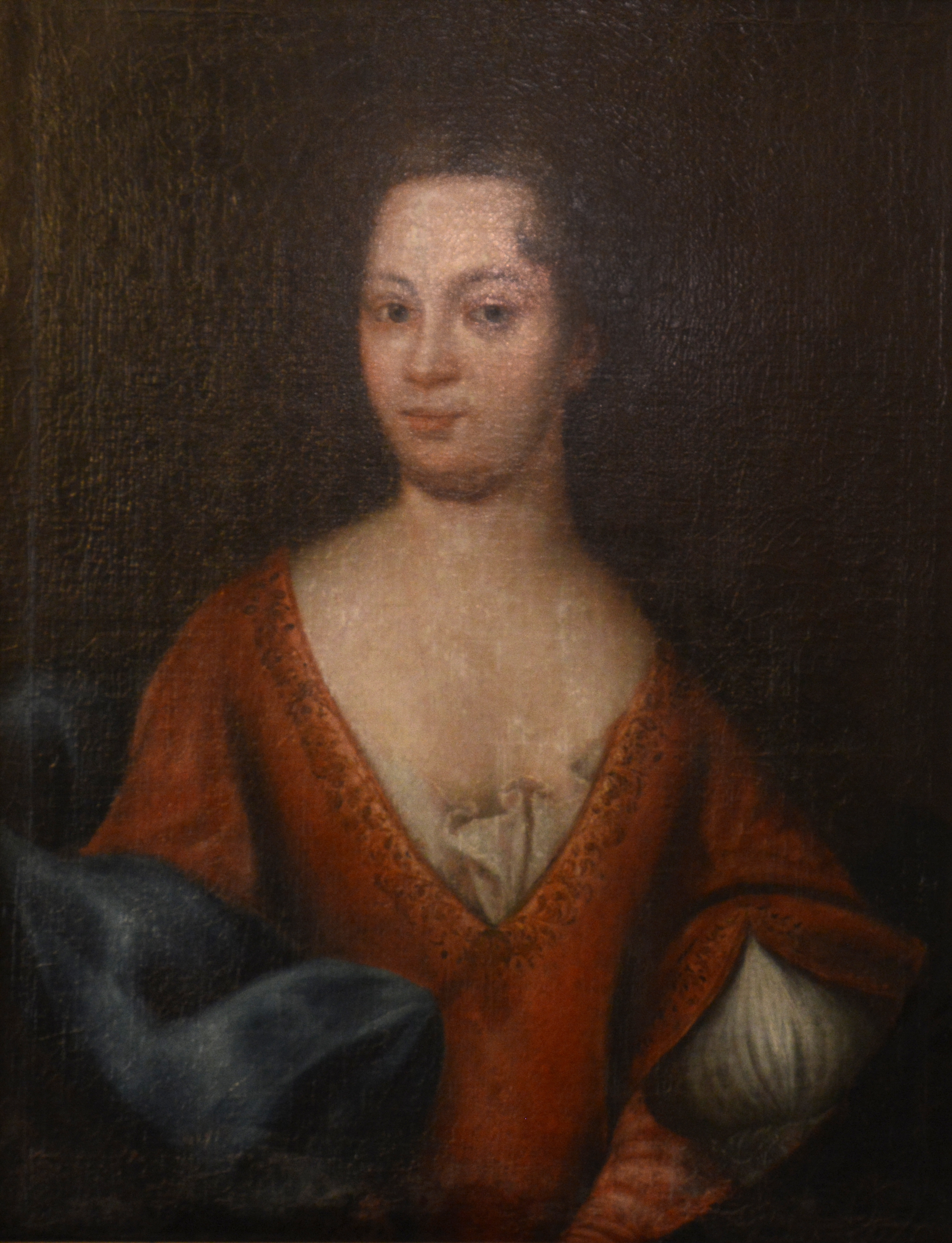
Anne Clausdatter

- 5 June – Anne Clausdatter, businesswoman and owner of Borgestad Manor in Skien (died 1713)

== Deaths ==
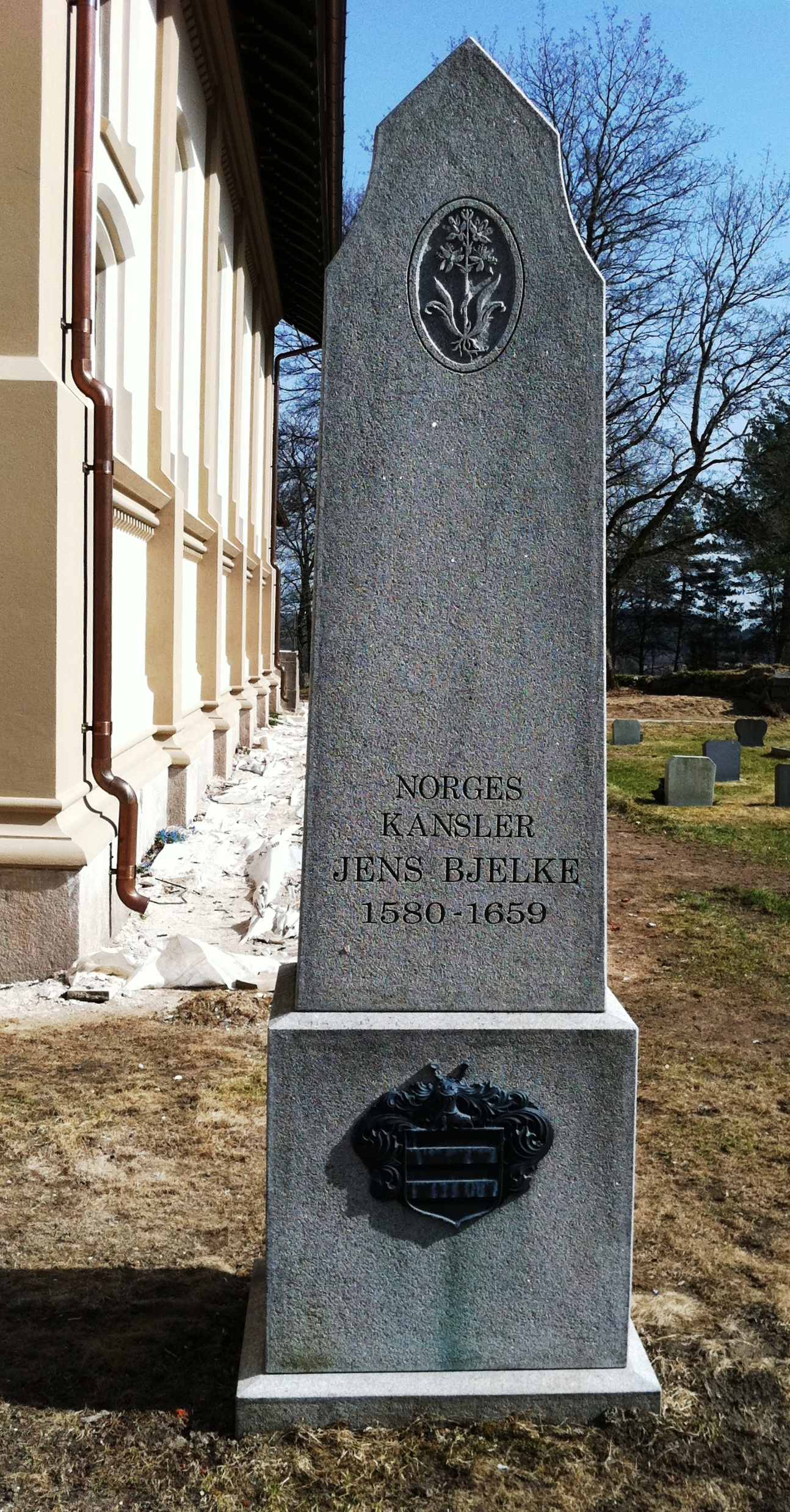
Memorial monument of Jens Bjelke

- 7 November – Jens Bjelke, nobleman, Chancellor of Norway (b.1580).
