= 1745 in Norway =

- Centuries: 16th; 17th; 18th; 19th; 20th
- Decades: 1720s; 1730s; 1740s; 1750s; 1760s
- See also: 1745 in Denmark; List of years in Norway

Events in the year 1745 in Norway.

== Incumbents ==
- Monarch: Christian VI.

== Arts and literature ==
- The construction of Paléet in Oslo is finished.

== Births ==
- 21 March - Johan Nordahl Brun, poet, dramatist, bishop and politician (died 1816)
- 8 June - Caspar Wessel, mathematician (died 1818)
