= 1656 in Norway =

- Centuries: 16th; 17th; 18th; 19th
- Decades: 1630s; 1640s; 1650s; 1660s; 1670s
- See also: 1656 in Denmark; List of years in Norway

Fiigenschoug's painting of Halsnøy Abbey (1656)

Events in the year 1656 in Norway.

== Incumbents ==
- Monarch: Frederick III.

== Events ==
Niels Trolle

- 27 February - The first Lindesnes Lighthouse was established on the Lindesnes peninsula, it was the first lighthouse in Norway.
- Niels Trolle is appointed Steward of Norway.

== Arts and literature ==
- Halsnøy Kloster, a prospect of Halsnøy Abbey was painted by Elias Fiigenschoug, it is regarded as the first Norwegian landscape painting.
- The construction of Austrått Manor is finished.

== Births ==
=== Full date unknown ===
- Hans Paus, priest and poet (d.1715).

== Deaths ==
=== Full date unknown ===
- Kristoffer Nieslen Tønder, Baliff of Austråt. (b.1587).
