= 1653 in Norway =

- Centuries: 16th; 17th; 18th; 19th
- Decades: 1630s; 1640s; 1650s; 1660s; 1670s
- See also: 1653 in Denmark; List of years in Norway

Events in the year 1653 in Norway:

== Incumbents ==
- Monarch: Frederick III

== Events ==
- May - The Vardø witch trials ends. It resulted in the death of seventeen women by burning.

=== Full date unknown ===
- The Customs House is moved further down the Telemarksvassdraget from the town of Skien to the smaller coastal town of Porsgrunn, making the latter a thriving market town.
- The Cappelen Family emigrates to Norway from Northern Germany.
- The southern coastal town of Vesterrisør is renamed "Mandal".

== Births ==
- 2 April – Prince George of Denmark and Norway (d.1708)

== Deaths ==
- Peter Paulson Paus, provost (born 1590)
