= 1743 in Norway =

- Centuries: 16th; 17th; 18th; 19th; 20th
- Decades: 1720s; 1730s; 1740s; 1750s; 1760s
- See also: 1743 in Denmark; List of years in Norway

Events in the year 1743 in Norway.

== Incumbents ==
- Monarch: Christian VI.

== Events ==
- 3-11 December - The Great Flood of 1743.
- Leaders of the free church, Zionittene, is arrested, four leaders was banished to Altona, and others was imprisoned in labor camps.

== Births ==
- 25 November – Jochum Brinch Lund, merchant (d.1807).

=== Full date unknown ===
- Ole Rødder, violinist (d.1806).

== Deaths ==
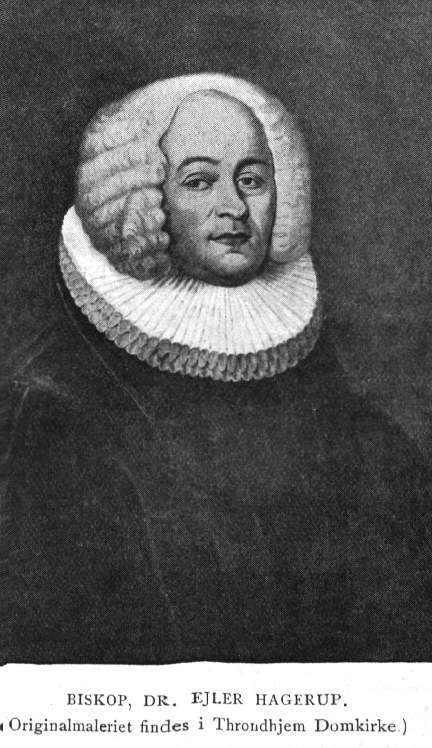
Eiler Hagerup d.e.

- 15 April – Eiler Hagerup d.e., bishop (born 1685).
- 14 September – Georg von Bertouch, composer and military officer (born 1668).
