= 1734 in Norway =

- Centuries: 16th; 17th; 18th; 19th; 20th
- Decades: 1710s; 1720s; 1730s; 1740s; 1750s
- See also: 1734 in Denmark; List of years in Norway

Events in the year 1734 in Norway.

== Incumbents ==
- Monarch: Christian VI.

== Events ==
- The first city fire in Kristiansand.

== Arts and literature ==
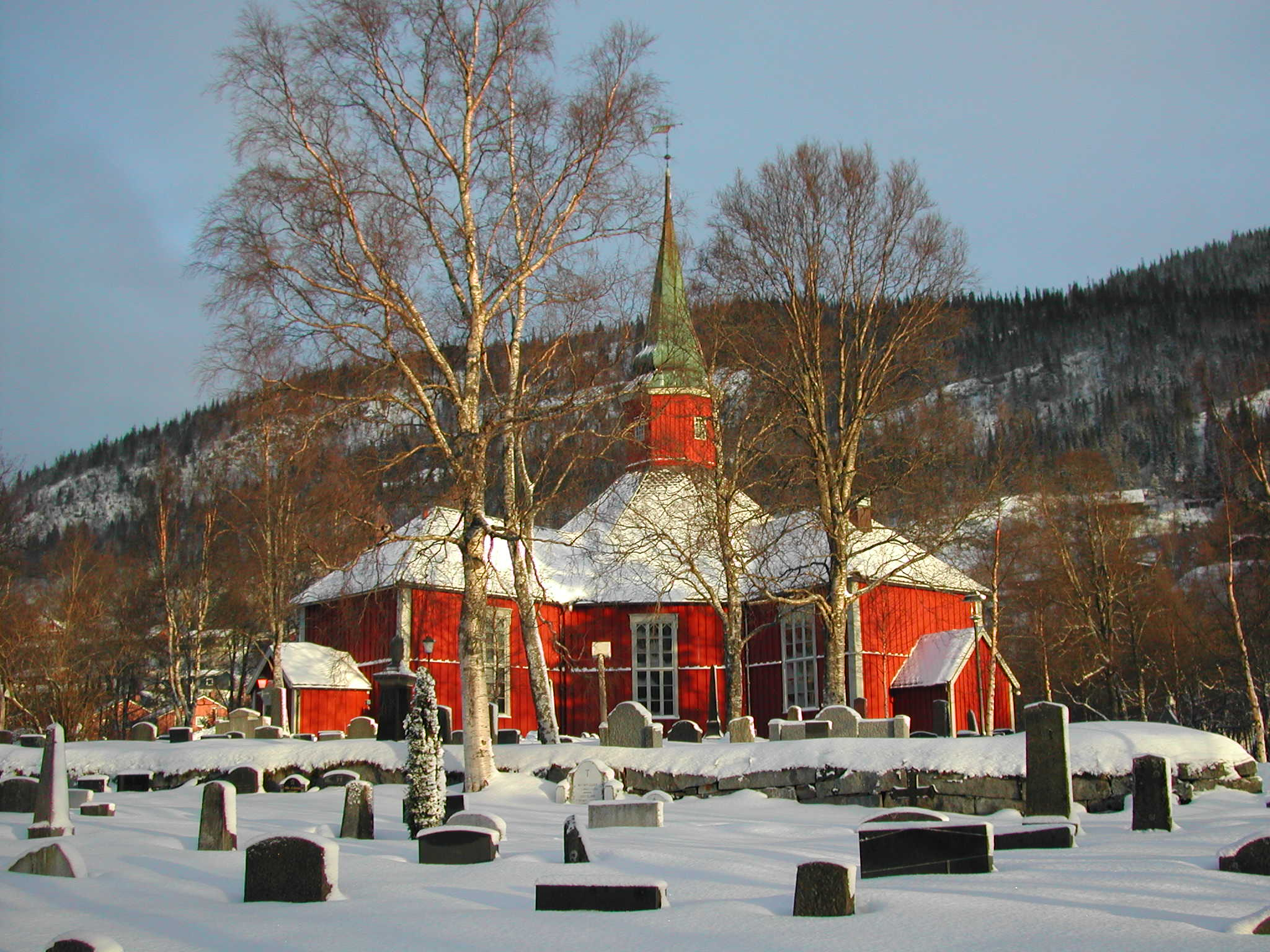
Dolstad Church

- Dolstad Church was built.

== Births ==
- 8 January - Niels Carlsen, shipowner and timber merchant (died 1809).
