= 1742 in Norway =

- Centuries: 16th; 17th; 18th; 19th; 20th
- Decades: 1720s; 1730s; 1740s; 1750s; 1760s
- See also: 1742 in Denmark; List of years in Norway

Events in the year 1742 in Norway.

== Incumbents ==
- Monarch: Christian VI.

== Events ==
- March - The Free church; Zionittene is established.
- July - Zionittene performs their first adult baptism in Drammenselva.
- Molde is incorporated as a city through a royal charter.
- Kristiansund is incorporated as a city through a royal charter.

== Births ==
- 10 August – Hans Tank, skipper, merchant and endowment founder (d. 1804).
- 6 October – Johan Herman Wessel, poet (died 1785)

== Deaths ==
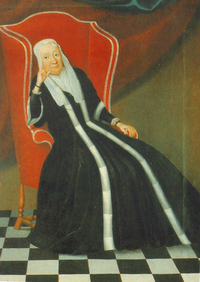
Karen Toller

- 13 August – Karen Toller, estate owner and ship owner (born 1662).
