= Møllmanns Landsted =

Rococo-style country house in Copenhagen, Denmark

Møllmann's Country House
- Møllmanns Landsted
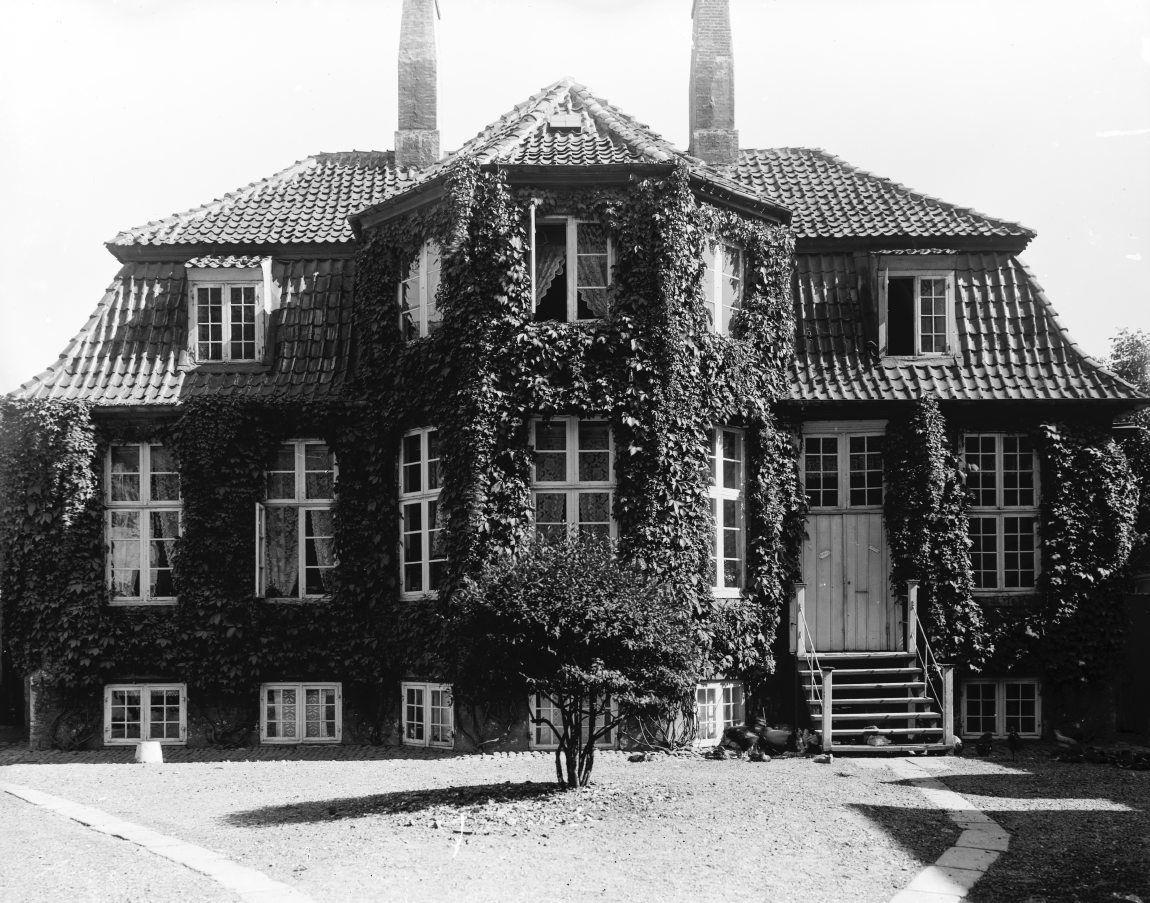
- Møllmann's Landsted photographed by Frederik Riise
- Interactive map of the Møllmann's Country House area

General information
- Location: Copenhagen, Denmark
- Coordinates: 55°40′31.69″N 12°32′0.28″E
- Completed: 1752

Design and construction
- Architect: Philip de Lange

Møllmanns Landsted, literally Møllmann's Country House, is a mid 18th-century Rococo-style country house now hidden from the street by a row of younger buildings at Allégade 6 in the Frederiksberg district of Copenhagen, Denmark. The building was from 1821 to 1887 home to Det Wærnske Institut, a home and educational facility for middle-class girls in difficult circumstances. The old country house and the building fronting the street are both listed in the Danish registry of protected buildings and places.

== History ==
=== Møllmann and Bøttger ===
Møllmanns Labndsted was built as a country house for textile merchant Magnus Møllmann. It is believed that the architect was Philip de Lange. The house was pulled further back from Allégade than the other houses along the street, on a long narrow lot, and was surrounded by a fine garden.

The next owner, Peter Christian Bøttger, was also a textile merchant. He constructed the house towards the street in 1794. Magnus Møllmann were both associated Copenhagen's German congregation at St. Peter's Church. Møllmann bought a crypt at the church on 7 October 1741. It was on 6 May 1806 acquired by Peter Christian Bøttger.

=== Det Wærnske Institut ===
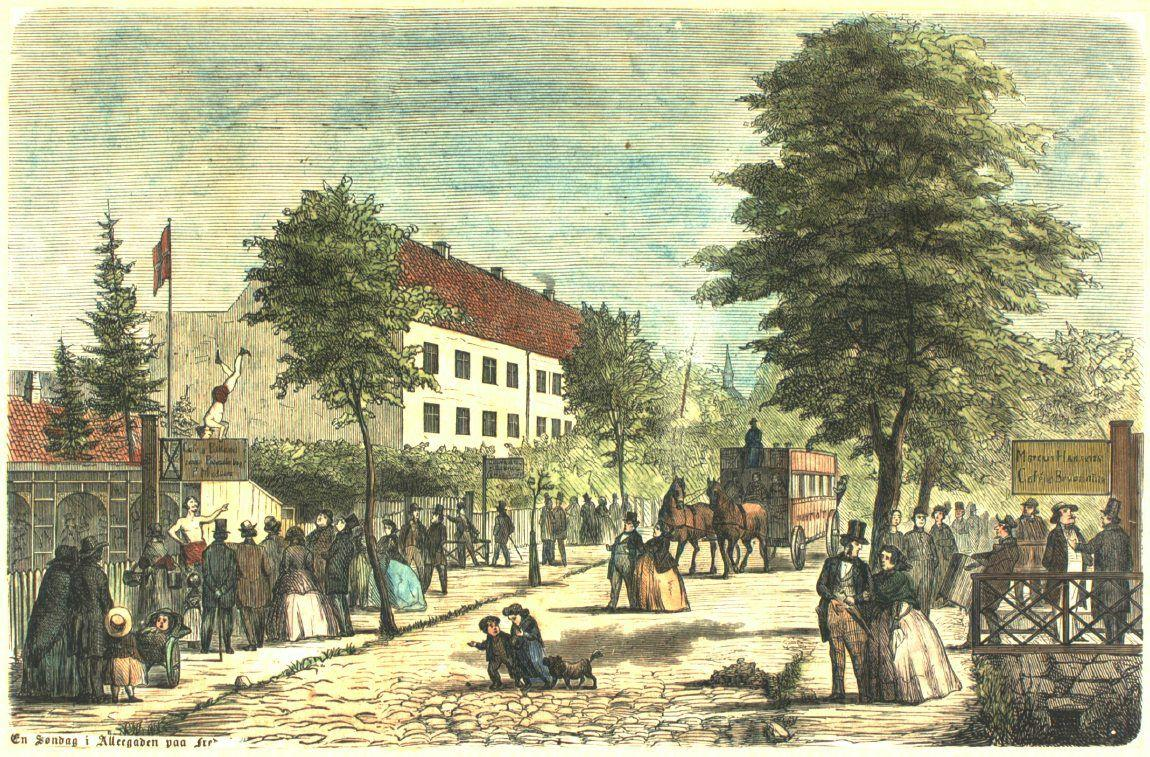
The building towards the street seen on a drawing from 1862

The property was in 1821 acquired by Det Wærnske Institut, a combined orphanage and educational facility for poor girls of the middle class. In her testament of 12 December 1800. Martha Wærn, the daughter of a wealthy merchant from Christiania who had just died, had left 200,000 Danish rigsdaler for the institution. Det Wærnske Institute prepared the girls for lives as capable housewives. Much of the land was sold off by the institution. It relocated to Villa Tharand at Katanievej 2 in 1887.

=== H. C. Heegaard and the Copenhagen Craftsmen's Association ===
Møllmanns Landsted was in 1888 sold to master shoemaker H. C. Heegaard. He endowed it to the Association of Craftsmen in Copenhagen. The old country house was in the 1930s modernized with new kitchen facilities, central heating and electricity.

The eastern end of the property towards Dr. Priemes Vej was in 1930 used for the construction of H. C. Heegaards og Hustrus Stiftelse, a charitable housing complex.

== Architecture ==
The building consists of a single storey over a raised cellar and has a Mansard roof clad with black-glazed, winged tiles. A five-sided avant-corps projects from each side of the building and each of the gables has a rectangular projection topped by a balcony.

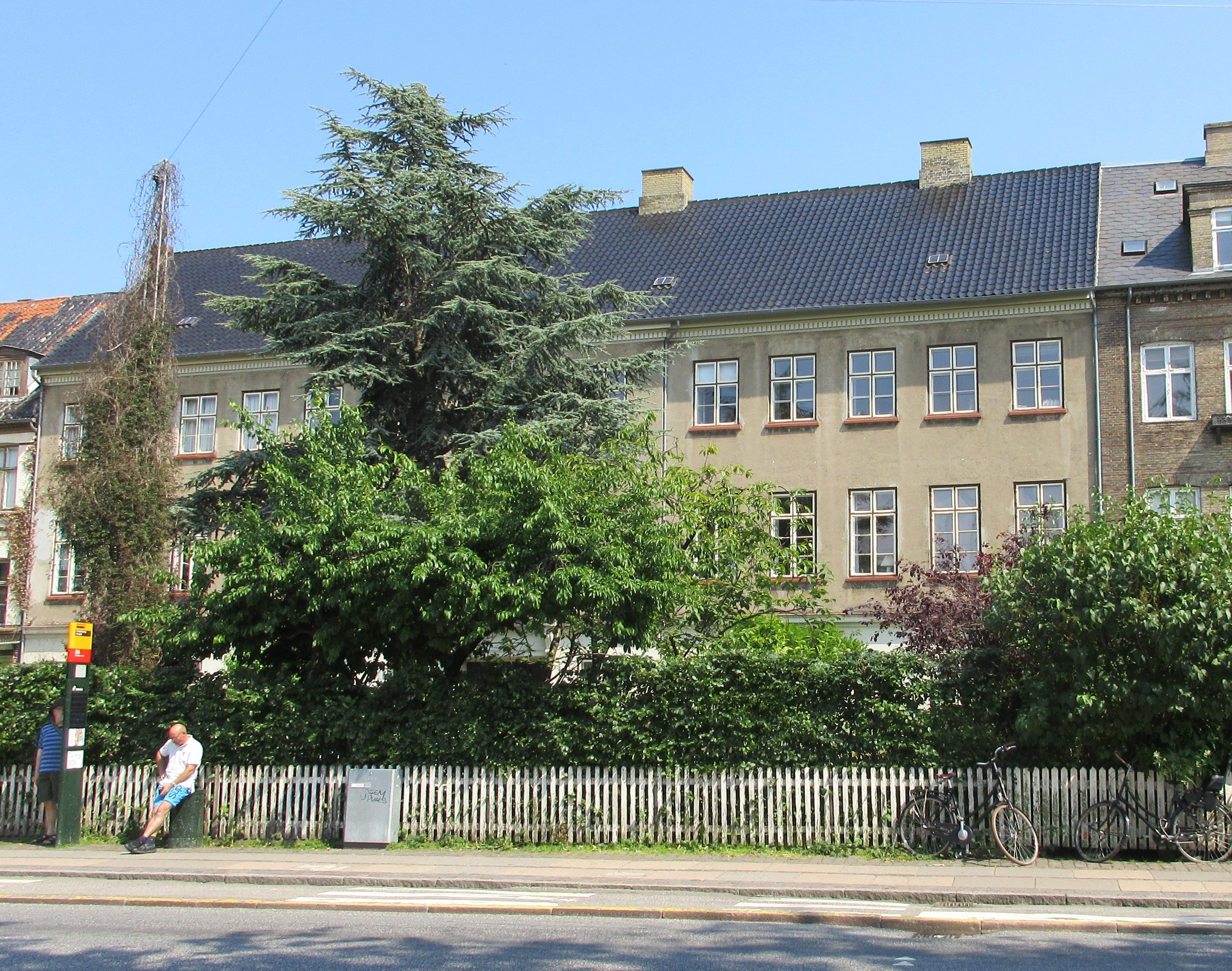
The building fronting the street

The ground floor contained two octagonal rooms, a vestibule towards the courtyard and a garden room t6owards the garden, but the main entrance was at an early stage moved to the right-hand side of the building where the staircase is located. The Mansard storey contained a central room in the full length of the building, with windows both towards the courtyard and the garden, and balconies at the gables, flanked by smaller rooms. The octagonal room towards the courtyard in the cellar was used as a pantry while the one towards the garden served as a cold room for storage of plants.

The building towards the street is 13 bays long. The building from 1794 was built over two streys but it was heightened by one storey in 1852. The facade is dressed in a pale, beige colour. A central gateway provides access to the courtyard. Two side wings from 1929 projects from the rear side of the building.
