= 1730 in Norway =

- Centuries: 16th; 17th; 18th; 19th; 20th
- Decades: 1710s; 1720s; 1730s; 1740s; 1750s
- See also: 1730 in Denmark; List of years in Norway

Events in the year 1730 in Norway.

== Incumbents ==
- Monarch: Frederick IV (until 12 October); then Christian VI.

== Events ==
- Siri Jørgensdatters witch trail, one of the last witch trials in Scandinavia.

== Births ==
=== Full date unknown ===
- Kristofer Sjursson Hjeltnes, farmer and businessperson (died 1804)
