= 1744 in Norway =

- Centuries: 16th; 17th; 18th; 19th; 20th
- Decades: 1720s; 1730s; 1740s; 1750s; 1760s
- See also: 1744 in Denmark; List of years in Norway

Events in the year 1744 in Norway.

== Incumbents ==
- Monarch: Christian VI.

== Events ==
- 48 members of the free church of Zionittene flees from Norway to Altona in Holstein.
- 31 December - The town of Holmestrand was founded.
- The first Chief of police is hired in Christiania.

== Births ==
- 15 September - Erik Must Angell, jurist and politician (died 1814)
- 19 November - Jakob Edvard Colbjørnsen, chief justice (died 1802)

=== Full date unknown ===
- Catharina Lysholm, businesswoman and ship-owner (died 1815)
- Jacob Juel, timber trader and civil servant (died 1800)
