= 1738 in Norway =

- Centuries: 16th; 17th; 18th; 19th; 20th
- Decades: 1710s; 1720s; 1730s; 1740s; 1750s
- See also: 1738 in Denmark; List of years in Norway

Events in the year 1738 in Norway.

== Incumbents ==
- Monarch: Christian VI.

== Events ==
- Theater was banned in Norway.

== Births ==
- 10 March – Peter Hersleb Classen, statesman (died 1825)

== Deaths ==
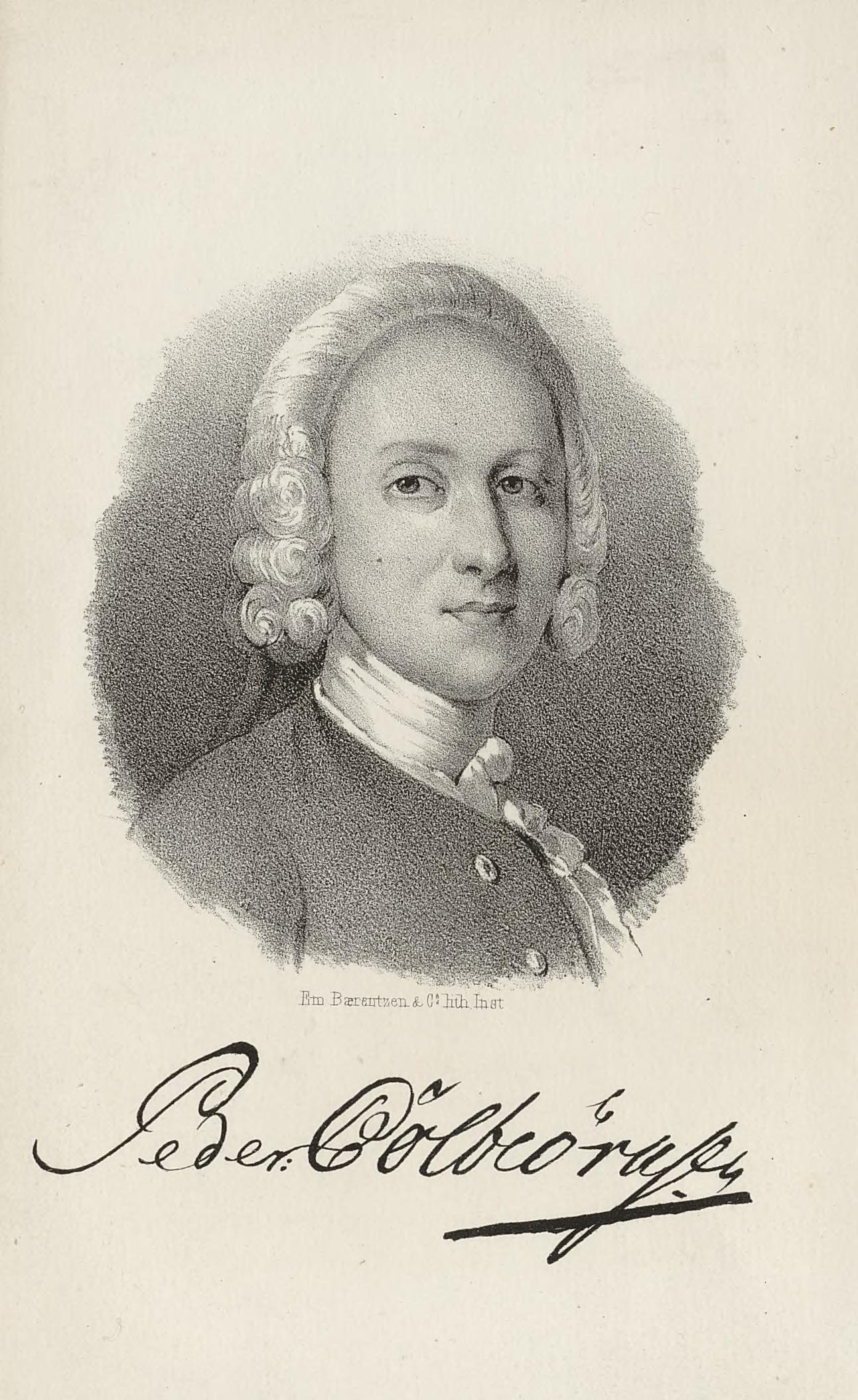
Peder Colbjørnsen

- 17 March – Peder Colbjørnsen, timber merchant and war hero (born 1683).
