= 1728 in Norway =

- Centuries: 16th; 17th; 18th; 19th; 20th
- Decades: 1700s; 1710s; 1720s; 1730s; 1740s
- See also: 1728 in Denmark; List of years in Norway

Events in the year 1728 in Norway.

== Incumbents ==
- Monarch: Frederick IV.

== Arts and literature ==
- Tretten Church was built.
- Skjervøy Church was built.

== Births ==
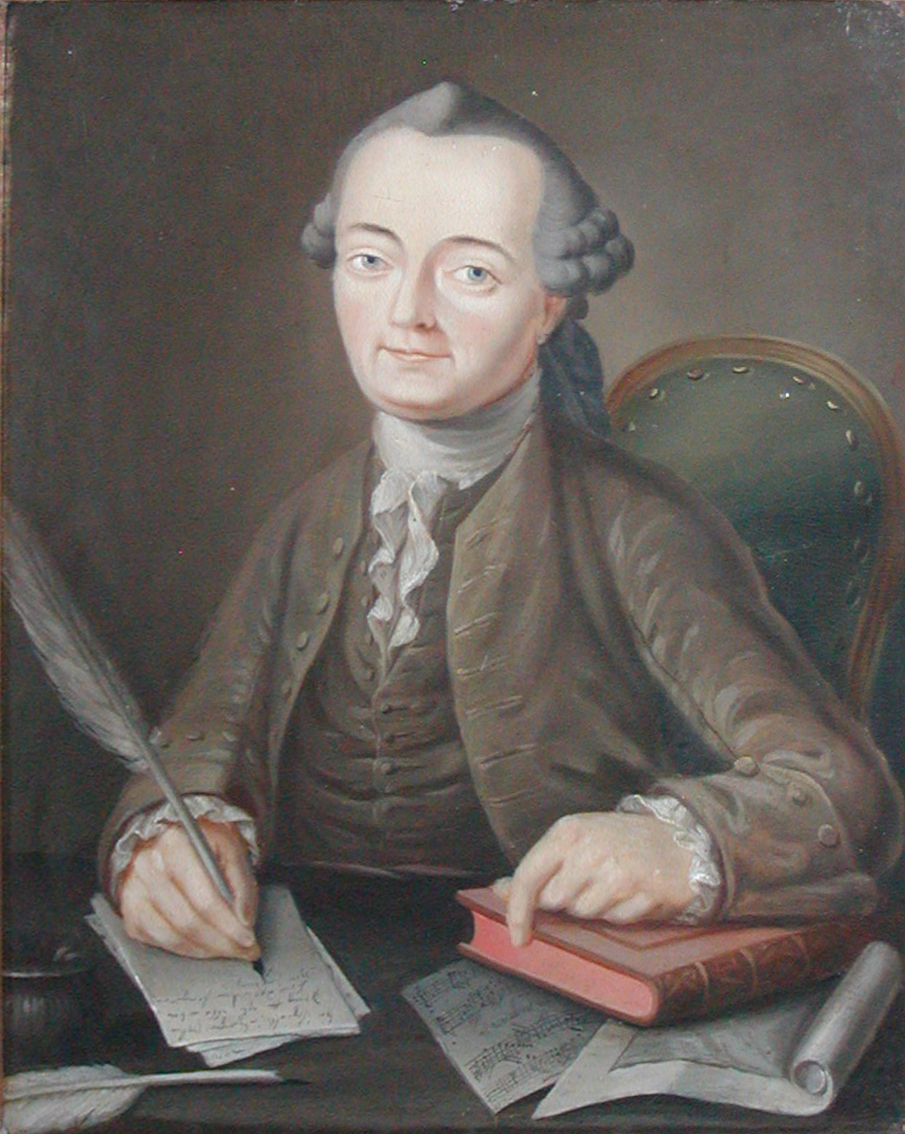
Christian Braunmann Tullin

- 4 July – Peder Harboe Hertzberg, potato priest (died 1802).
- 6 September – Christian Braunmann Tullin, businessman and poet (died 1765).

== Deaths ==
- Jørgen Otto Brockenhuus, military officer (born 1664).
