= 1736 in Norway =

- Centuries: 16th; 17th; 18th; 19th; 20th
- Decades: 1710s; 1720s; 1730s; 1740s; 1750s
- See also: 1736 in Denmark; List of years in Norway

Events in the year 1736 in Norway.

== Incumbents ==
- Monarch: Christian VI.

== Events ==
- Mandatory confirmation is introduced.
- Hans Jacob von Arnold was appointed commander-in-chief of the Norwegian army.

== Arts and literature ==
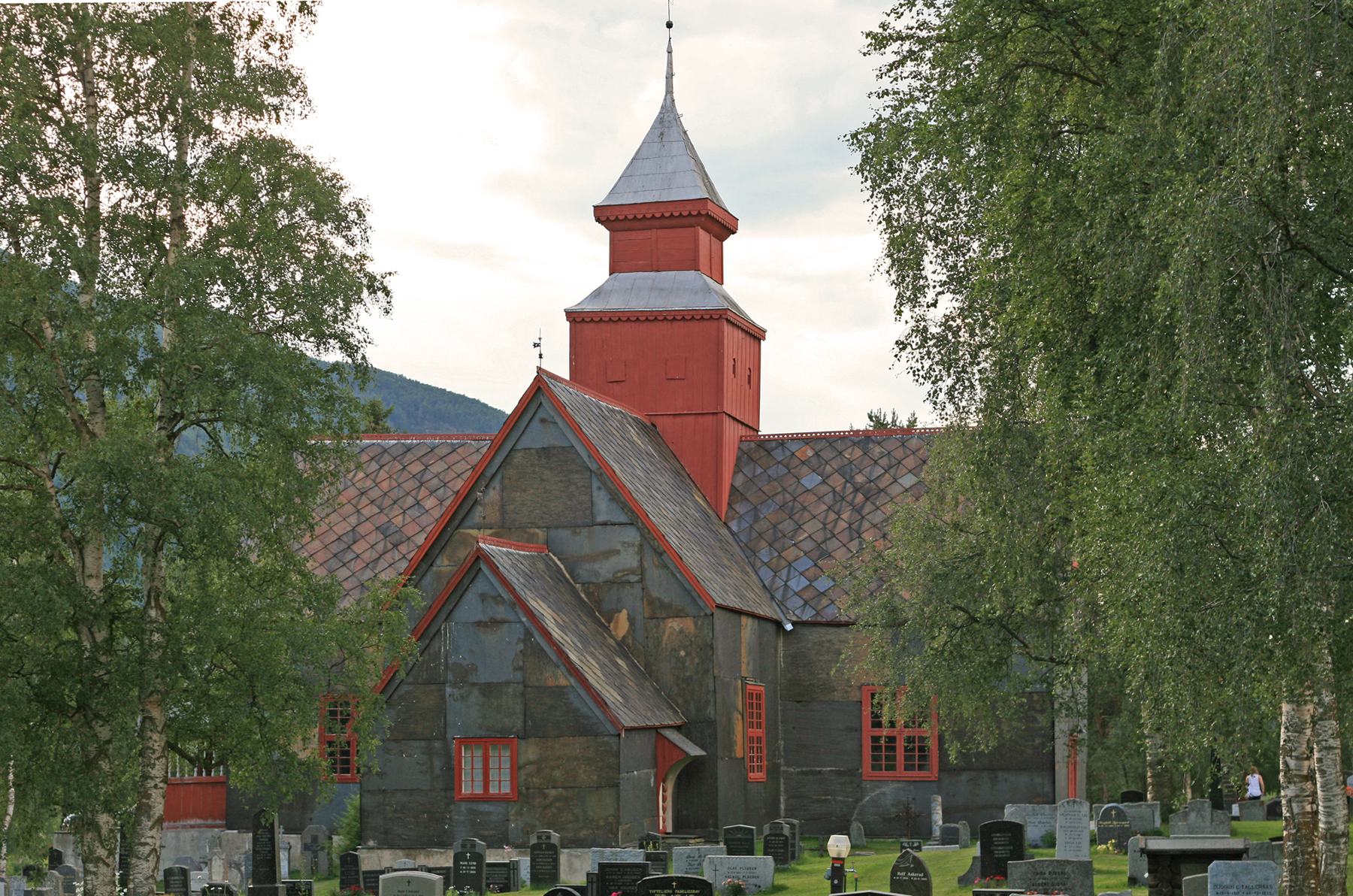
Dovre Church

- The construction of Dovre Church is finished, with a pulpit carved by Lars Pinnerud.

== Births ==
- 14 February – Johan Peter Wleugel, naval officer and cartographer (died 1825 in Denmark)
- 5 August – Christian Kølle, educator (died 1814)

== Deaths ==
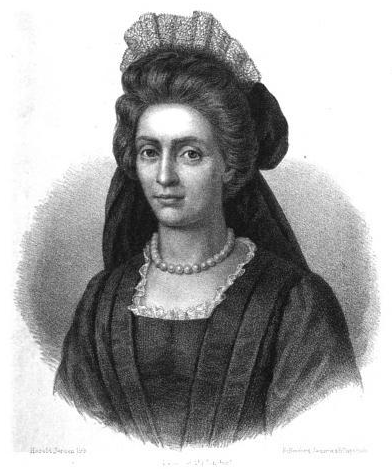
Anna Colbjørnsdatter

- 23 July – Anna Colbjørnsdatter, national heroine (born 1665 or 1667).
- 18 December – Christian Stub, jurist, law historian and civil servant (born 1693).
