= 1732 in Norway =

- Centuries: 16th; 17th; 18th; 19th; 20th
- Decades: 1710s; 1720s; 1730s; 1740s; 1750s
- See also: 1732 in Denmark; List of years in Norway

Events in the year 1732 in Norway.

== Incumbents ==
- Monarch: Christian VI.

== Arts and literature ==
- The Speigelberg Company performs in Norway.

== Births ==
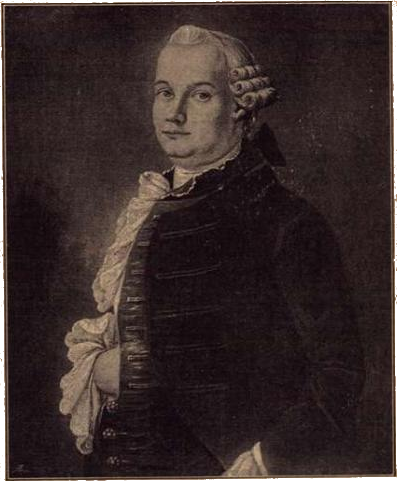
Morten Leuch

- 15 April - Morten Leuch, timber merchant and landowner (died 1768).
- 1 July - Even Hammer, civil servant (died 1800).
- Salve Johannessøn Kallevig, merchant (died 1794).
