= 1655 in Norway =

- Centuries: 16th; 17th; 18th; 19th
- Decades: 1630s; 1640s; 1650s; 1660s; 1670s
- See also: 1655 in Denmark; List of years in Norway

Events in the year 1655 in Norway.

== Incumbents ==
- Monarch: Frederick III.

== Events ==
- 20 December Gregers Krabbe dies at Akershus Castle, the first Governor-General of Norway to die in office.

== Arts and literature ==
- 6 February – Vuku Church is consecrated.

== Births ==
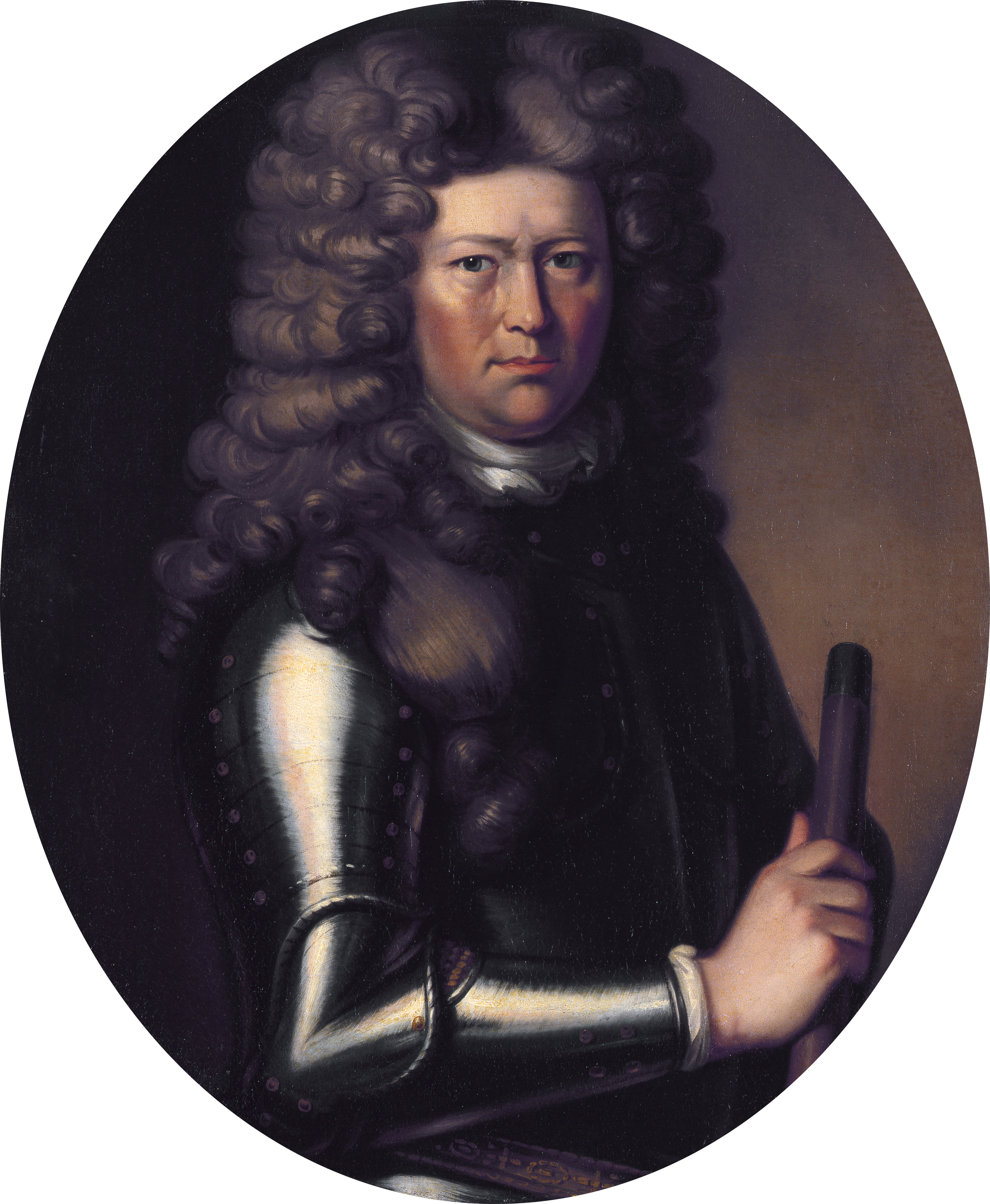
Cornelius Cruys

- 14 June – Cornelius Cruys, Vice Admiral of the Imperial Russian Navy (d.1727).

== Deaths ==
- 20 December – Gregers Krabbe, Governor-General of Norway (born 1594).
