= 1735 in Norway =

- Centuries: 16th; 17th; 18th; 19th; 20th
- Decades: 1710s; 1720s; 1730s; 1740s; 1750s
- See also: 1735 in Denmark; List of years in Norway

Events in the year 1735 in Norway.

== Incumbents ==
- Monarch: Christian VI.

== Events ==
- 12 March - The first Holiday Peace Act was introduced.

=== Undated ===
- Arendal is incorporated as a city through a royal charter.
- The Danish-Norwegian Grain Monopoly was introduced, a trade policy that banned the import of foreign grain into Denmark and southern and eastern Norway, the monopoly lasted until 1788.

== Births ==
=== Full date unknown ===
- Anders Porsanger, Sami linguist and priest (died 1780)
