= 1748 in Norway =

- Centuries: 16th; 17th; 18th; 19th; 20th
- Decades: 1720s; 1730s; 1740s; 1750s; 1760s
- See also: 1748 in Denmark; List of years in Norway

Events in the year 1748 in Norway.

== Incumbents ==
- Monarch: Frederick V.

== Events ==
- 11 June - The Dannebrog became the only official merchant flag in Norway. The royal standard flag became forbidden to be used on merchant ships.

== Arts and literature ==
- 8 December - Røn Church is completed.

== Births ==
- 15 July - Frederik Otto Scheel, military officer and civil servant (died 1803).
