= 1727 in Norway =

- Centuries: 16th; 17th; 18th; 19th; 20th
- Decades: 1700s; 1710s; 1720s; 1730s; 1740s
- See also: 1727 in Denmark; List of years in Norway

Events in the year 1727 in Norway.

== Incumbents ==
- Monarch: Frederick IV.

== Births ==
- 22 February – Christen Schmidt, bishop (died 1804).
- 19 July – Ditlevine Feddersen, culture personality (died 1803).
- Eistein Kjørn, woodcarver (died 1805).

== Deaths ==
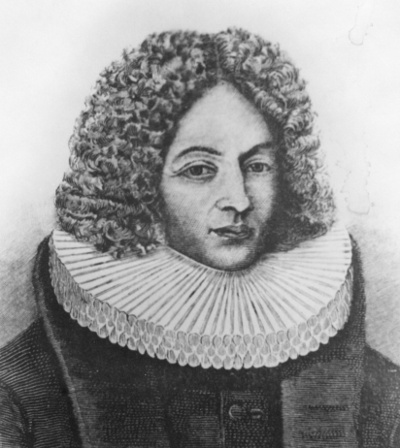
Thomas von Westen

- 9 April – Thomas von Westen, priest and missionary (born 1682).
- 29 May – James Collett, timber trader (born 1655).
