= Georg Pettersen =

Norwegian politician

Georg Pettersen (1 September 1803 – 25 June 1879) was a Norwegian politician.

He was elected to the Norwegian Parliament in 1854 and 1857, representing the constituency of Sarpsborg. He worked as both stipendiary magistrate (byfoged), chief of police and postmaster in that city. He served two terms.
