= 1658 in Norway =

- Centuries: 17th; 18th; 19th
- Decades: 1630s; 1640s; 1650s; 1660s; 1670s
- See also: 1658 in Denmark; List of years in Norway

Events in the year 1658 in Norway.

== Incumbents ==
- Monarch: Frederick III.

== Events ==
- 11 February - Norwegian troops fought in the assault on Eda Sconce.
- 8 March - The Treaty of Roskilde resulted in the ceding of the Norwegian provinces of Båhuslen and Trondhjems len to Sweden. (At the Treaty of Copenhagen (1660) Trondhjems len was returned to Norway).
- Jørgen Bjelke was appointed commander-in-chief of the Norwegian army.
- 5 August - The Bjelke Feud (named after Jørgen Bjelke) starts.
- 14 September - The First Battle of Frederikshald, Swedish forces are defeated by the Norwegian forces.
- 4 October - The siege of Trondheim starts, Norwegian forces besiges the city.
- 11 December - The siege of Trondheim ends, the Swedish forces surrender the city to the Norwegians.

== Arts and literature ==
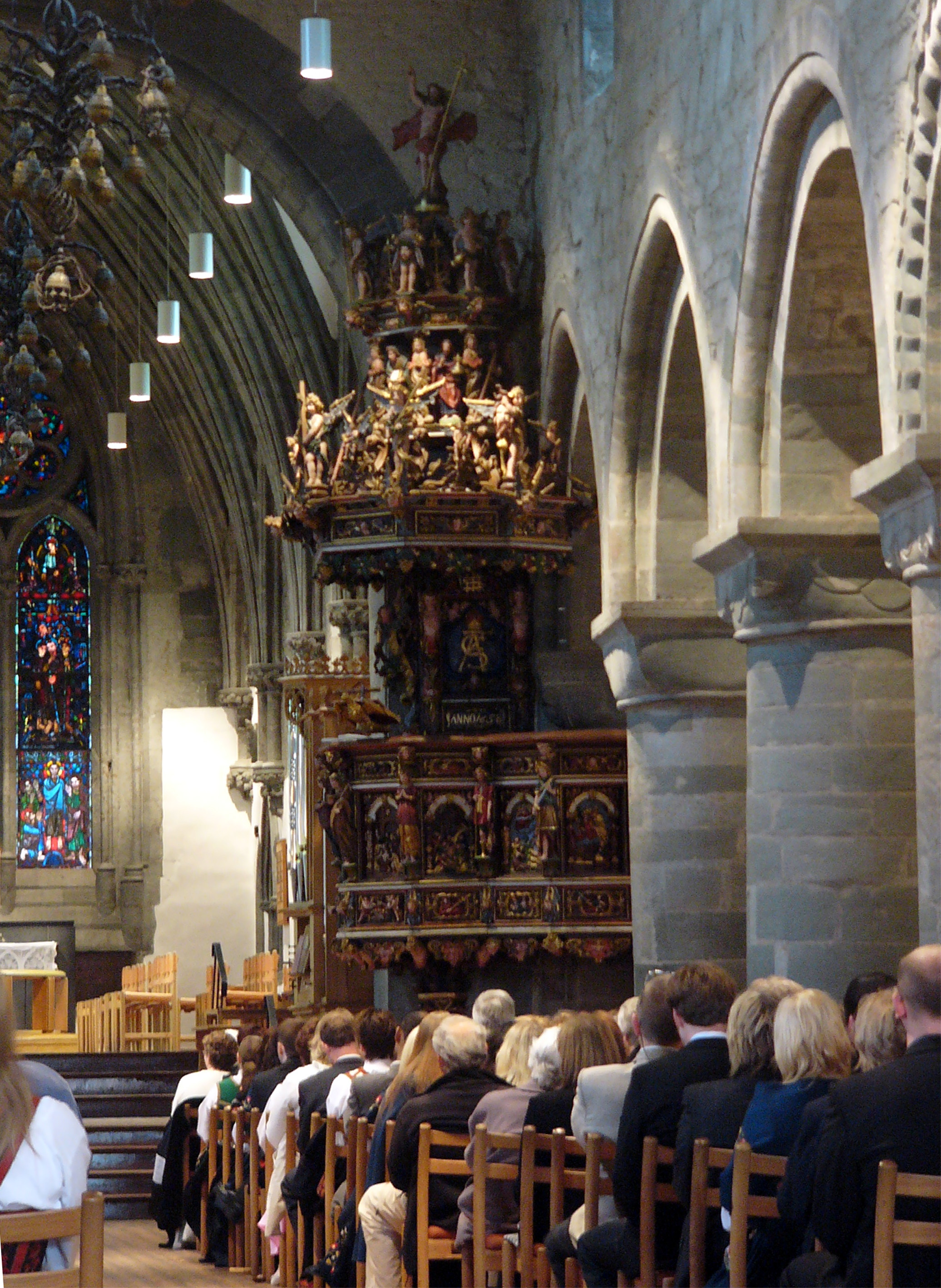
Pulpit in Stavanger Cathedral

- The pulpit in the Stavanger Cathedral is carved by Andrew Lawrenceson Smith.
