= Peder Jørgen Cloumann =

Norwegian bailiff and politician

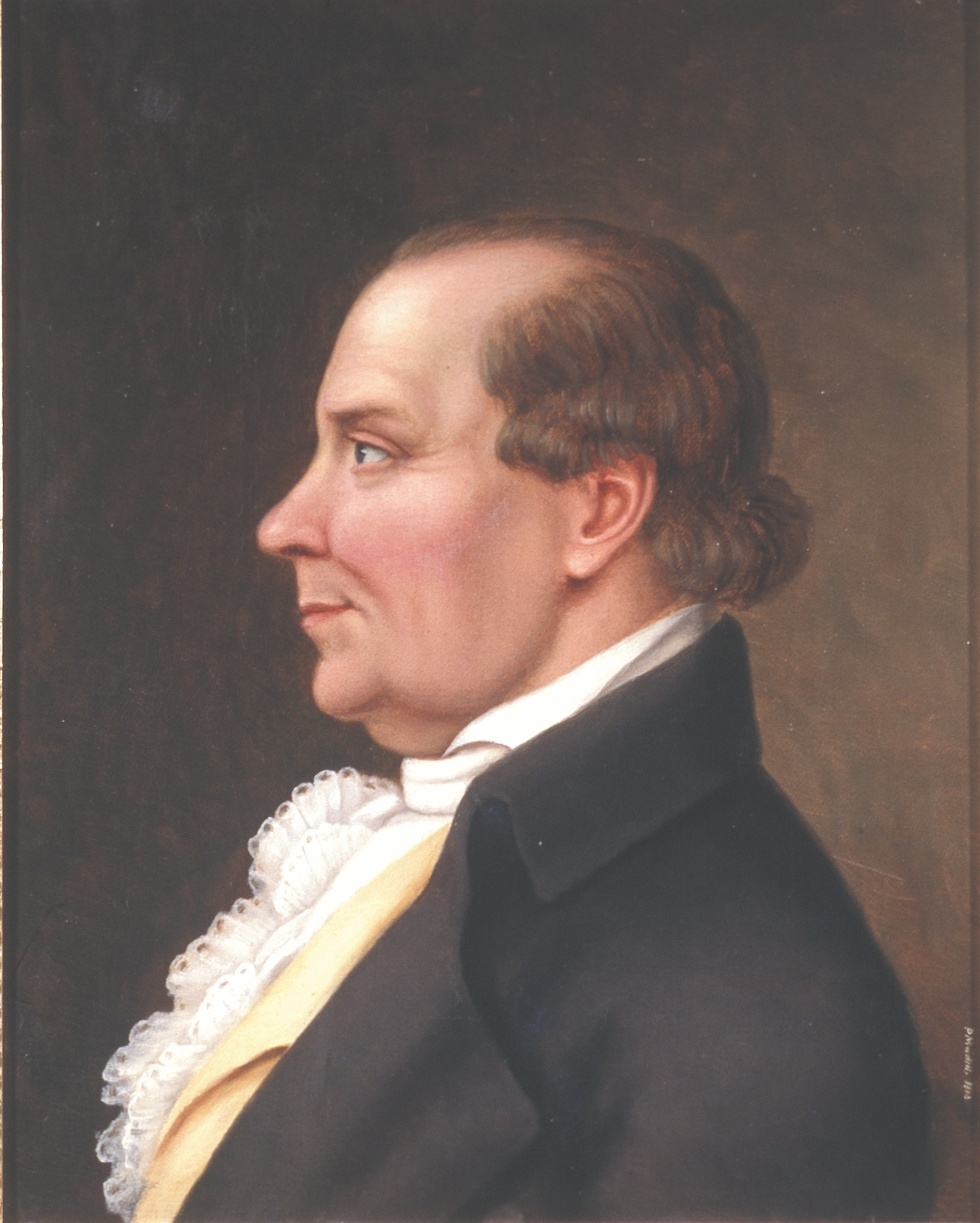
Peder Jørgen Cloumann painted by P. Meidell

Peder Jørgen Cloumann (14 April 1747 – 22 December 1817) was a Norwegian bailiff and politician.

Peder Jørgen Cloumann was born at Strandebarm in Søndre Bergenhus, Norway where his father was the parish priest. He studied in the University of Copenhagen and achieved his Baccalaureate degree in 1763. In 1766, he went to Bratsberg county where he served as representative of the governor.

He was bailiff in Øvre Telemark from 1772 to 1811. He purchased the Moen farm in the parish of Kviteseid during 1783. He represented Bratsberg amt (now Telemark) at the Norwegian Constituent Assembly at Eidsvoll Manor in 1814 where he belonged to the union party (Unionspartiet).
