= Reier Gjellebøl =

Reier Gjellebøl (22 April 1737 – 24 November 1803) was a Norwegian priest and writer.

He was born at Høland in Akershus. He took matriculation exam at Copenhagen in 1755 and then continued his studies in theology. He initially worked as a teacher in Denmark. He served as parish priest at Valle Church from 1772 and in Stavanger from 1782. He is known for his topographical descriptions of the parish of Høland (1771), and of the valley and district of Setesdalen (completed 1777, printed 1800).
