= Martha Wærn =

Norwegian-Danish philanthropist

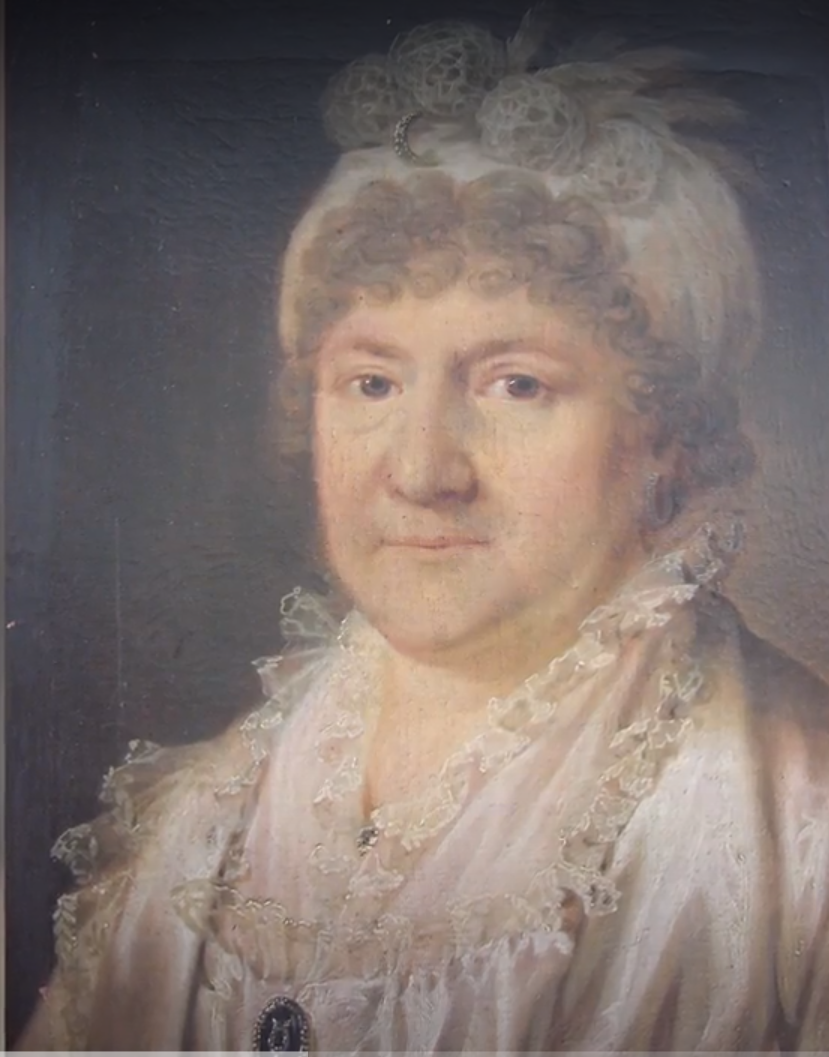
Martha Wærn by C. A. Lorentzen (1804)

Martha Wærn née Haslef, also Værn, (22 April 1741 – 27 January 1812) was a wealthy Norwegian-Danish philanthropist who was born and raised in Christiania, today's Oslo. On her death, in accordance with her will, substantial funding was left for the establishment of a boarding school where fatherless middle-class Norwegian and Danish girls could be trained to become good housewives. Known as Det Wærnske Institut, the school opened in 1814 on Allégade in Copenhagen.

== Biography ==
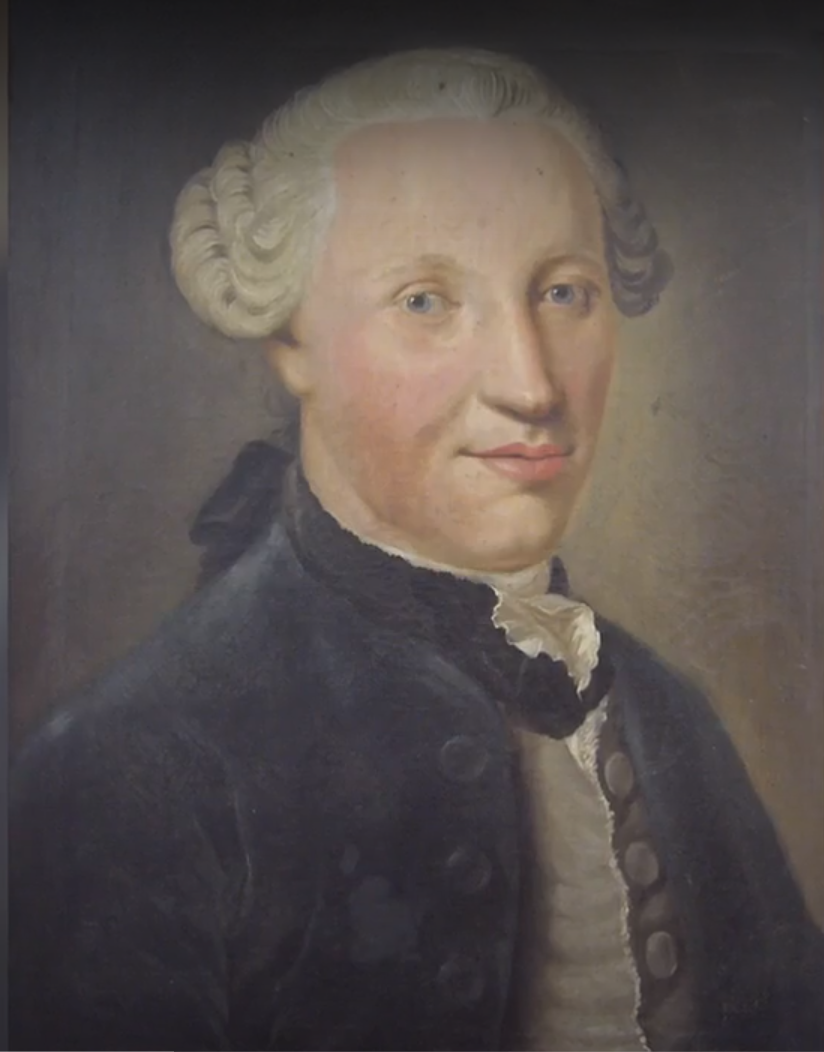
Morten Wærn by C. A. Lorentzen (1804)

Born on 22 April 1741 in Christiania, Martha Haslef was the younger daughter of the Danish-born merchant Paul Haslef (1706–1781) and Anne Brun (1713–1741). Together with her sister Anna Maria, she was brought up in a well-to-do home in the city. After her mother died when she was an infant, she lived in the family home until she was 30 when she married Morten Wærn, the town clerk, who had been married to her sister until her death in 1771. They had no children.

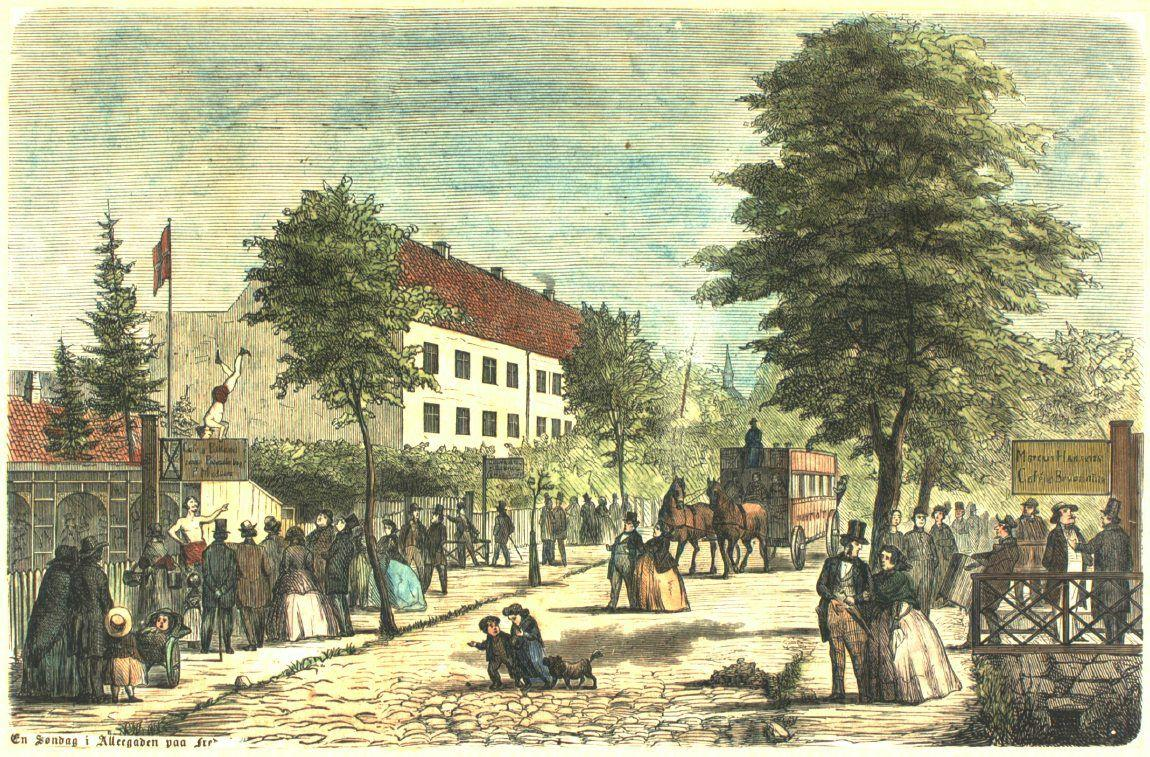
Drawing by Christian Dreichmann of the building on Allégade housing Det Wærnske Institut (1982)

Following her father's death in 1781, they moved to Copenhagen where her husband died in 1796. Martha Wærn had already inherited from her father and now was left with an even larger fortune. When she died in Copenhagen on 27 January 1812, she left behind a fortune of 200,000 Danish rigsdaler. In addition to the funds she left for the establishment of the Wærn Institute, she also left a considerable amount to the Norwegian Cadet Corps (Norske Landkadetkorps) and made a donation to Herlufsholm School.

== Legacy ==
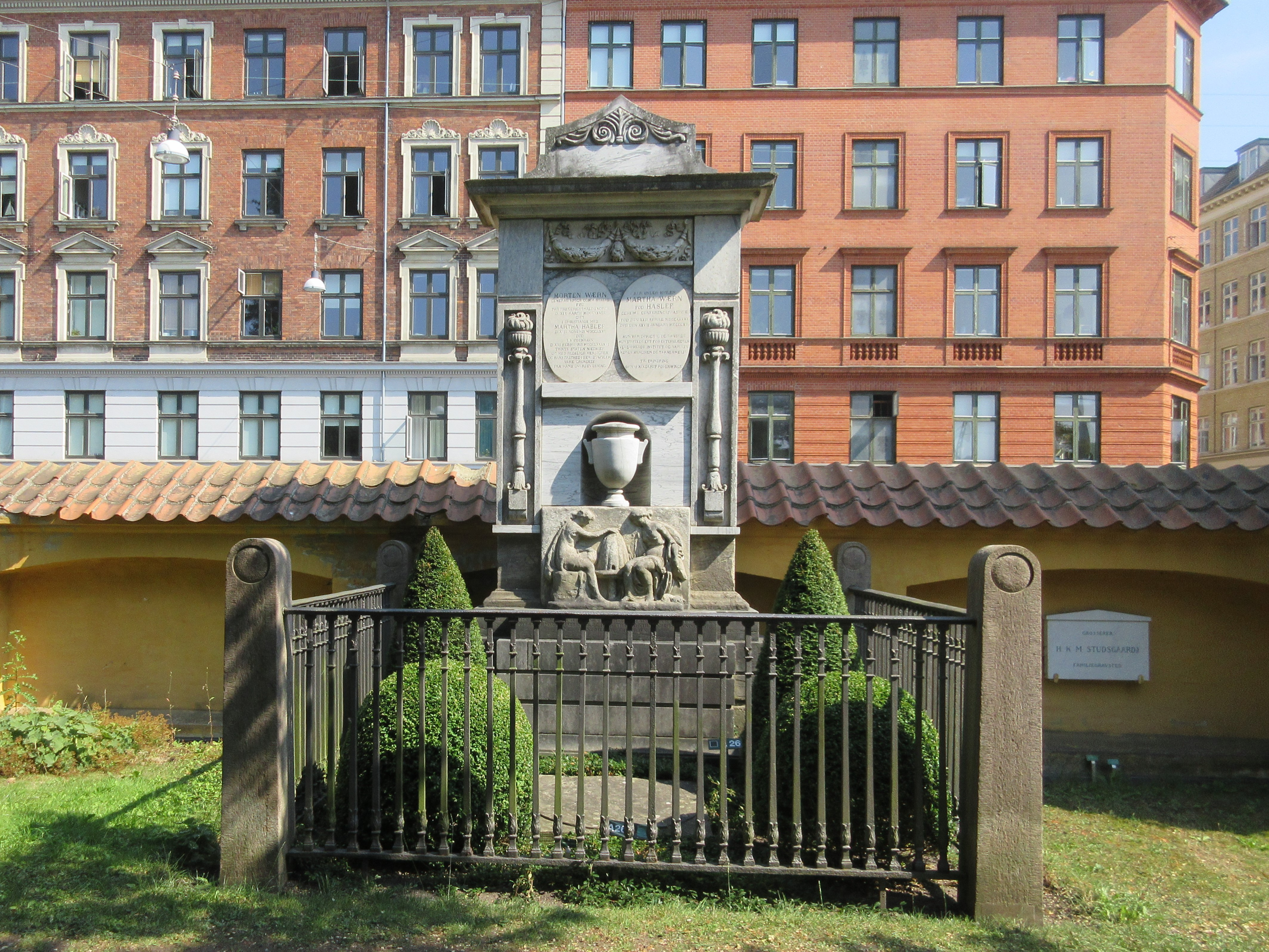
The tomb of Morten and Martha Wærn in Assistens Cemetery, Copenhagen, August 2022.

Martha Wærn is together with her husband buried in Copenhagen's Assistens Cemetery. Their grave monument was designed by Johannes Wiedewelt

The Wærn Institute was opened in 1814 as an orphanage and boarding school. Peder Andreas Kolderup Rosenving and Peter Johan Monrad had been selected by Wærn as the two first directors of the institution. Det Wærnske Institut was from 1821 to 1887 based in Møllmanns Landsted at Allégade 6 and then in Luis Bramsen's Villa Tharand on nearby Kastanievej (No. 2). The institution were in 1914 taken over by Mariaforbundet. . It is now operated under the name Kastanievejens Efterskole.
