= Battle of Hjärtum =

Dano-Swedish battle

- Part of the Dano-Swedish War (1657–1658)
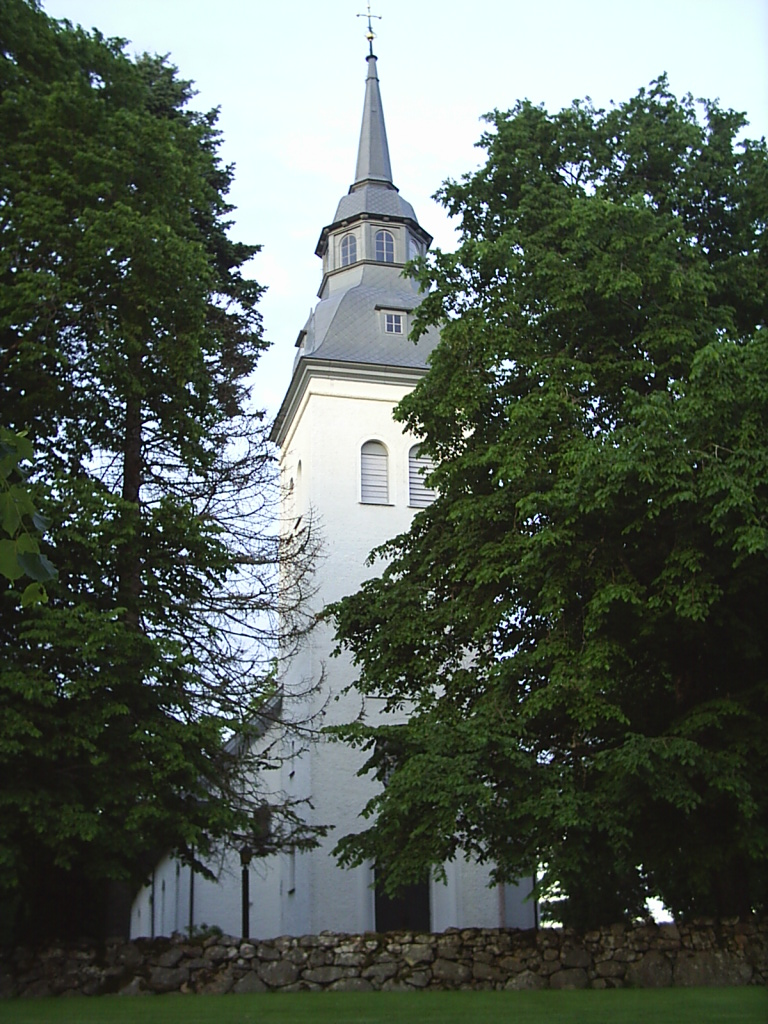
- Image of Hjärtum Church, around where the battle occurred.
Date	27 September, 1657 (O.S.); 7 October, 1657 (N.S.)
Location	Hjärtum, Bohuslän
Result	Disputed, see result

Belligerents
(yes) Swedish Empire	Denmark–Norway

Commanders and leaders
(Swedish Empire) Erik Stenbock (Swedish Empire) Harald Stake (Swedish Empire) Per Lennartson Ulfsax (Swedish Empire) Olof Andersson Silfverlood (Swedish Empire) Johan Stake †	(Denmark–Norway) Iver Krabbe

Units involved
(Swedish Empire) Västmanland Regiment (Swedish Empire) Västgöta cavalry Regiment	Unknown

Strength
2,300 men 8–10 guns	2,000–2,200 men 6 guns

Casualties and losses
See losses	See losses

The Battle of Hjärtum was fought on 27 September (O.S.) or 7 October (N.S.) between Danish-Norwegian and Swedish forces during the Dano-Swedish War of 1657–1658.

== Background ==
On 25 September, Erik Stenbock, with some 2,300 men and some 8–10 cannons, marched towards Hjärtum in Bohuslän. Colonel Johan Stake quickly linked up with this force, along with his men. The Swedes wanted to act out their revenge on Iver Krabbe for his ruthlessness against the civilian population in the province.

== Battle ==
On Sunday of 27 September / 7 October, the Danish-Norwegian and Swedish forces met at Hjärtum. The day before, some 200 Swedes, to the despair of vicar Peder Bakke, occupied the church cemetery which surrounded the church to seek protection behind the strong cemetery wall. Krabbe quickly found out that the Swedes had blocked his path north, and after a quick march from Spekeröd with some 2,000–2,100 or 2,200 men and six guns, he arrived south of Hjärtum at around 10 o'clock.

Krabbe found out that the Swedes were standing on top of the nearby plateau, and the way up on the narrow and crooked road was very stressful to force on the soldiers. Around 7:30 o'clock, the Swedes discovered Krabbe's advance, and Swedish patrols fought with the Danes in their flanks, and many Norwegians were killed in the bad terrain, but their advance continued.

Main leaders

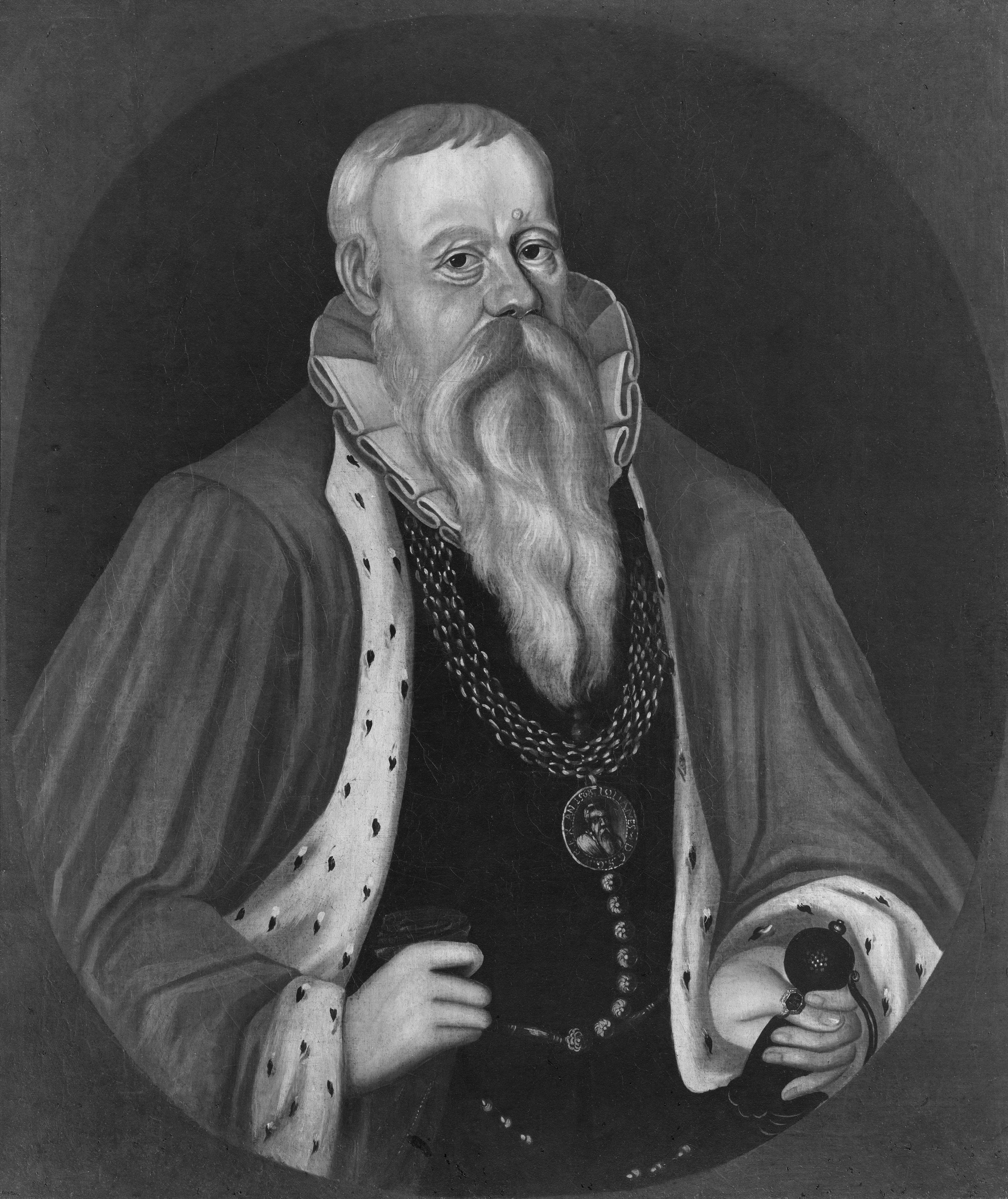
Portrait of Erik Stenbock, by an unknown author

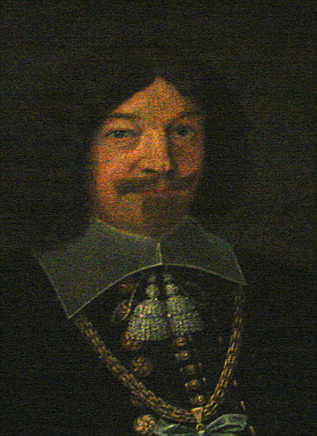
Portrait of Iver Krabbe by an unknown author

Lieutenant General Harald Stake, at around 9 o'clock, received orders to attack the Danes and sent a vanguard of 400 dragoons from the Västmanland Regiment under Lieutenant Colonel Per Lennartson Ulfsax along with 100 Västgöta cavalry under Lieutenant Colonel Silfverlood. They pulled two light field cannons with great difficulty through the narrow forest which was filled with stone blocks. In the resulting fighting, the Swedes suffered heavy casualties, losing both their cannons and Ulfsax's standard. The fighting in the steep and rocky terrain was very difficult, which led Stenbock to withdraw back onto the plateau, named Hjärtums Skee.

This plateau, which today is used as a cemetery, was then a moor of around a kilometer long and 400 meters wide, and it was here where the main part of the battle would take place.

The Danish-Norwegian artillery, consisting of both 3-pounders along with other, higher caliber ones, killed many Swedes. The smoke from the cannons and muskets eventually became so thick that it almost became impossible for the fighters on either side to see their enemies or their own standards. Stenbock wrote the following in a report about the battle:

We happened upon such a mixture that in the smoke, we could not distinguish the enemy's or our own standards or banners.

The fighting dragged on for around eight hours and only ended once the evening approached and the Swedes retreated. A Swedish soldier claimed that 350 cannonballs, 9,000 musketballs, and around 1.776 pounds of gunpowder (Note: 1,366 skålpund is around 1.766 pounds) had been fired during the battle.

== Aftermath ==
=== Losses ===
The Swedish losses were larger than the Dano-Norwegian ones, which amounting to some 100 killed, wounded, or captured. The Swedish ones were in total around 180–200 killed, which consisted of two captains, ten lieutenants and ensign's, 18 underofficers, and some 150 regular soldiers. Johan Stake was also among the dead, having been wounded early in the battle, and later killed with a stab to the heart.

Krabbe himself claimed that the Swedes had suffered a few hundred dead and wounded, which is possibly a reasonable estimate. However, he likely downplayed his own losses, which he claimed as nine dead and 18 wounded.

=== Result ===
The exact result of the battle is disputed, some sources claim it was a Dano-Norwegian victory, while others claim it was a Swedish victory.

== Works cited ==
- Essen, Michael Fredholm von (2023). Charles X's Wars: Volume 3 - The Danish Wars, 1657-1660. Helion & Company. ISBN 9781915113603.
- Sundberg, Ulf (2010). Sveriges krig 1630-1814 [Sweden's wars 1630–1814] (in Swedish). Svenskt militärhistoriskt bibliotek. ISBN 9789185789634.
- Isacson, Claes-Göran (2015). Karl X Gustavs krig: Fälttågen i Polen, Tyskland, Baltikum, Danmark och Sverige 1655-1660 [Wars of Charles X Gustav: The campaigns in Poland, Germany, the Baltics, Denmark and Sweden 1655-1660] (in Swedish). Historiska Media. ISBN 9789175450117.
