= Christi Krybbe skoler =

Elementary school in Bergen, Norway

Coordinates: 60°23′48.43″N 5°19′40.66″E

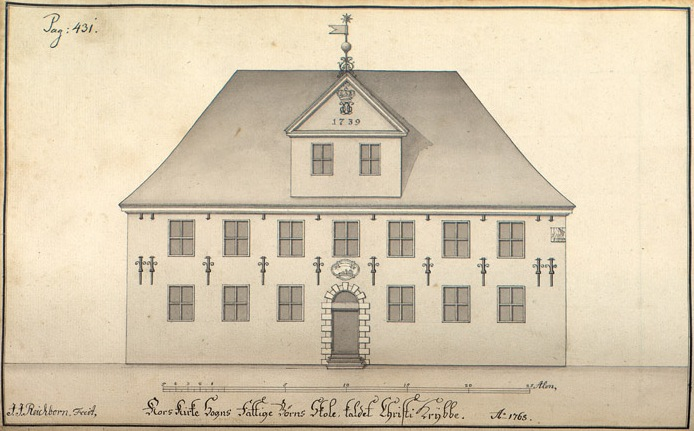
Drawing of Christi Krybbe skoler by J.J. Reichborn in Hildebrant Meyers manuskripter, 1764

Christi Krybbe skoler is an elementary school in Bergen, Norway. It is the oldest existing school of elementary education in Scandinavia, having been founded 1737 under the name Korskirken's School for the Poor. The school got its own building in 1740, and the name was changed to Christi Krybbe fundasskole. Later, in 1874, the school was expanded when a second building, named Øvregaten skole, was built next to the old one. Starting 1874, both buildings were called Øvregaten skole, a name which lasted until the entire school was renamed Christi Krybbe skoler in 1970.
