= Nordlands Trompet =

Poem

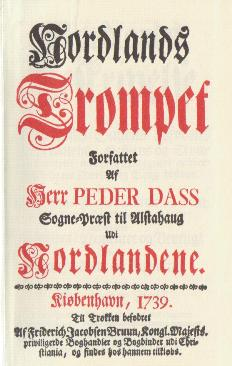
Titlepage of Nordlands Trompet.

Nordlands Trompet is a tributary poem by Norwegian priest and poet Petter Dass, praising the nature and people of Nordland. The poem was probably written between the 1660s and 1690s, and was first published posthumously in 1739.

Nordlands Trompet is regarded as Dass' most important work. The poem first gives a general description of Nordland, including weather conditions, animal life, birdlife, the Sami people, fisheries and trade. Then follows descriptions fief by fief.
