= Vincens Budde =

Danish-Norwegian general (1660–1729)

Vincents Budde
- Born: 1660; Halden, Norway
- Died: 1729 (aged 68–69)
- Allegiance: Denmark-Norway
- Service years: ?–1729
- Rank: Major General
- Spouse: Armgaard Margrethe Gabelin

Vincens Budde (also known as Vincents Budde or Vincent Budde) was a Norwegian officer, born in 1660 in Halden, Norway into a Norwegian military family (his father, Frederick Otto Budde, served under Tønne Huitfeldt at Fredriksten fortress in Halden, which repelled a Swedish attack in 1660). Budde was promoted to colonel 1710 and to major general in 1716.

== Military career ==
Budde was commissioned Løjtnant (Lieutenant) in Løvendals's Regiment in 1683 and was promoted to Kaptajn (Captain) in 1688.

On 17 April 1710 Colonel Budde took command of a battalion of the 2nd (or lower) Tronhjemske Regiment, and in 1711 he led them to Holstein on the Danish–German border. In 1713 he led two battalions of the 2nd Tronhjemske Regiment during the successful investment of Stralsund. By 1715 he had been promoted to brigadier general and commanded forces stationed in Pomerania.

In January 1716, Karl XII of Sweden began an offensive in Norway, with the intention of taking advantage of Denmark-Norway's stationing of 4,500 Norwegian soldiers, including those led by Brigadier General Budde, to Denmark and Northern Germany in 1715. The Swedes expected supremacy over the remaining Norwegian military forces since Swedish forces consisted largely of seasoned mercenaries, while the remaining Norwegian home forces were soldiers with limited military training and poor equipment. However, after a failed Swedish siege of Akershus fortress, three combat experienced Norwegian regular regiments with about 4,000 men, commanded by Brigadier General Budde, arrived from Denmark on 17 April 1716. These forces were dispatched to the southern flank where they secured the fortress city of Fredrikstad and disrupted the supply lines between the Swedish forces in Christiania, and Sweden.

Brigadier General Vincens Budde led the attack on a Swedish battalion stationed in Moss under Colonel Falkenberg. Colonel Falkenberg fortified the city center concentrated his defense. Budde led 1,000 men of the 2nd Trondhjemske, Bergenhusiske and Cicignons regiments from Fredrikstad. They received critical support from Admiral Gabel's forces including several ships of the line and smaller vessels, which delivered 500 men under the command of Lieutenant Colonel Henrik Jørgen Huitfeldt, to cut off access for Swedish forces from the north. By morning the morning of 23 April 1716, Budde's forces captured Moss and the Swedish forces there. Brigadier General Budde was promoted to major general as a result of this resounding victory over a respected opponent.

Major General Budde saw further action in the final days of the Great Northern War, when Karl XII initiated a second invasion of Norway in autumn 1718. While Karl XII led his main army in an attack on Fredrikshald, he dispatched an army under General Carl Gustaf Armfeldt into Trøndelag to seize Trondheim. Armfeldt advanced against Trondheim, which was defended by an army of 6,900 men under General Budde. Although Armfeldt's forces surrounded Trondheim, Budde's forces held him at bay. When Karl XII was killed in December at Fredriksten, Budde's strategy prevailed. Armfeldt's forces were forced to retreat back across the mountains to Sweden in a Carolean Death March almost as disastrous as Napoleon's retreat from Moscow.

Budde remained in active service until his death in 1729, at almost 70 years of age.

== Family and personal life ==
He was appointed Knight of the Order of the Dannebrog in 1721.

He married rather late in life to Armgaard Margrethe Gabelin, the daughter of Vice Governor-general of Norway Frederik G. Juel and Ane Cathrine Juel on 16 April 1718. She was born in Pleskov in Russia on 10 November 1677 and died in Trondheim on 8 March 1734. No children are recorded for this union.
