= Ragnhild Abelset =

Norwegian merchant, landowner and Lensmann (died 1733)

- Born: Ragnhild Lauritzdatter Abelset c. 1660; Ørskog, Norway
- Died: 1733 (aged 72–73); Ørsta, Norway
- Other name: Ragnelde Abelseth
- Spouse: Knud Olsen Wig (m. 1678; died 1703)
- Children: 12

Ragnhild Lauritzdatter Abelset (also known as Ragnelde Abelseth; c. 1660–1733), was a merchant, landowner in Denmark–Norway. She was the first female Lensmann in Norway. After she was widowed she became one of the richest women in Sunnmøre.

== Life ==
Ragnhild Lauritzdatter Abelset was born at the Apalset farm in the parish of Ørskog (now in Ålesund Municipality), likely around 1660, although the exact year is unknown. She was born into a bourgeois family and was the daughter of Margrete Laugesdatter Gamst and Lauritz Olsen Abelset. Her paternal grandfather, father, brother and nephew all held the office of Lensmann in what is now Valle Municipality, while her mother was descended from old nobility.

She married Knud Nilssen Wig a merchant, landowner and Lensmann in Sunnmøre, in around 1678 and together they had 12 children, however only 6 survived. A portrait, likely by Caspar Skildrer, of Abelset with her husband and all of her 12 children was painted in 1703, which today hangs in Ørsta Church. That same year, Abelset's husband died and she took over the management of his estate and business company as well as his office of Lensmann, becoming the first women in Norway to hold that office. While in that position, she invested heavily in church buildings. Abelset donated a large chandelier with her parents' names on it to Ørvastik Church, where there is still an epitaph about Abelset, her husband and their 6 surviving children. She also commissioned woodcarving pieces for Ørsta Church.

After she was widowed, Abelset made no effort to remarry and instead focused on her business and Lensmann roles. Through her businesses, she doubled her fortune from 1704 to 1733.

After nearly a decade as Lensmann, her son Iver Knudsen Wig eventually took over her role in Ørsta. Abelset died in Ørsta in 1733.
