= 1677 in Norway =

- Centuries: 16th; 17th; 18th; 19th
- Decades: 1650s; 1660s; 1670s; 1680s; 1690s
- See also: 1677 in Denmark; List of years in Norway

Events in the year 1677 in Norway.

== Incumbents ==
- Monarch: Christian V.

== Events ==
- 6–23 July - Battle of Marstrand.
- August - Norwegian forces of 2,000 men, led by General Reinhold von Hoven and General Christian Shultz occupies Jemtland.
- 28 August - Battle of Uddevalla.
- November - Sweden retakes Jemtland.
- The construction of Staverns Fortress was finished.

== Arts and literature ==
- 6 January - Larvik Church was consecrated.

== Deaths ==
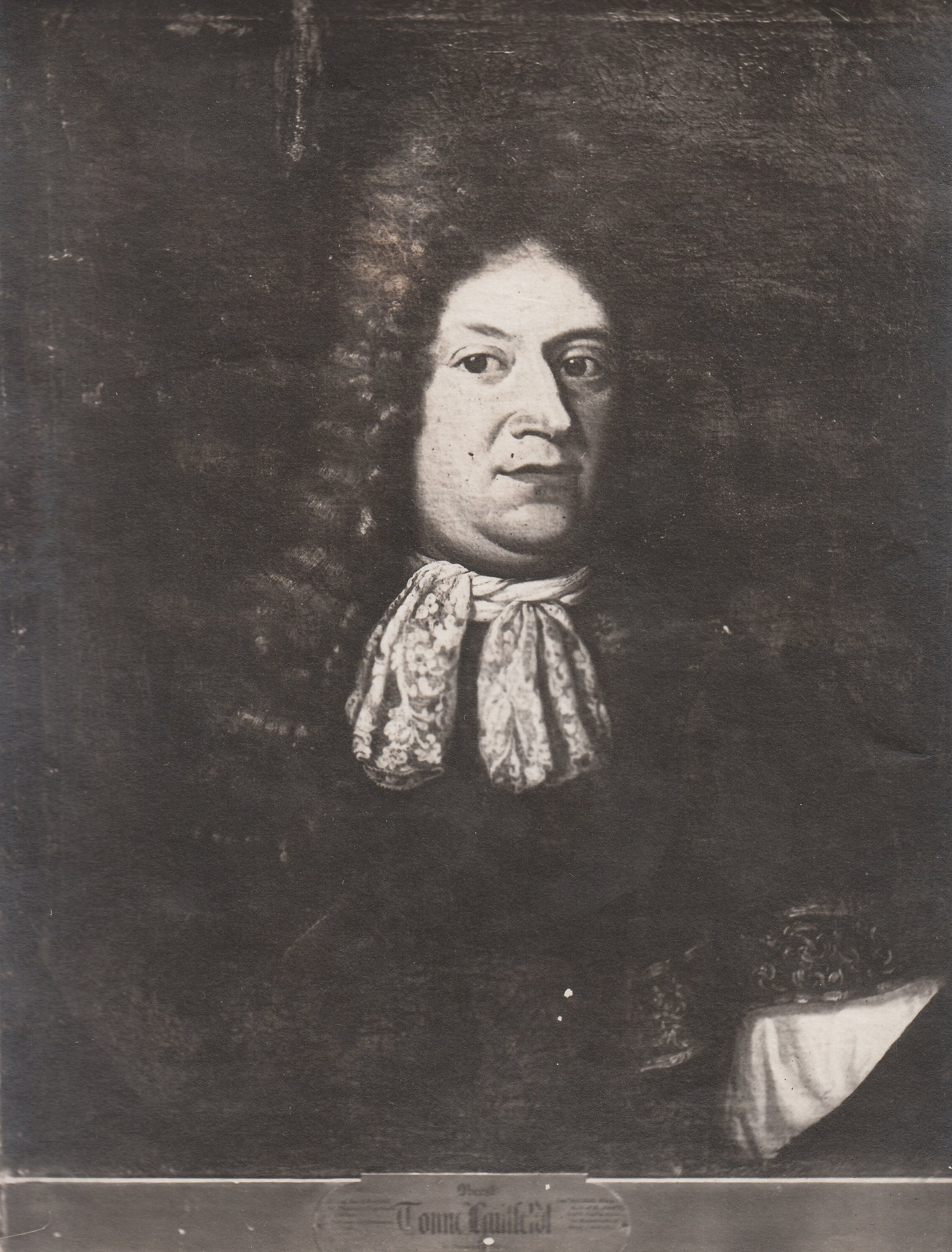
Tønne Huitfeldt

- 16 February – Robert Hamilton, governor and military officer (born around 1625).
- 12 September – Tønne Huitfeldt, landowner and military officer (born 1625).
