= 1678 in Norway =

- Centuries: 17th; 18th; 19th
- Decades: 1650s; 1660s; 1670s; 1680s; 1690s
- See also: 1678 in Denmark; List of years in Norway

Events in the year 1678 in Norway.

== Incumbents ==
- Monarch: Christian V.

== Events ==
- Gyldenløve War:
  - 4 June – 23 July – Siege of Bohus Fortress.
  - July – Røros was burned to the ground by the Swedish Army.
- 6 June – Synnøve Johansdatter was convicted of witchcraft. She was the last person to be executed for witchcraft in Finnmark.
- King Christian V established the Barony of Rosendal (Baroniet Rosendal). It was and remained the only fief barony in Norway, during the union with Denmark.

== Arts and literature ==
- Dorothe Engelbretsdatter hymn and poetry book, Siælens Sang-Offer is published for the first time.

== Deaths ==
- 12 August – Jacob Maschius, clergyman, poet and copperplate engraver (born c.1630).

=== Exact date missing ===
- Christen Bang, priest and theological writer (born 1584).
- Synnøve Johansdatter, alleged witch.
