= 1739 in Denmark =

- Decades: 1710s; 1720s; 1730s; 1740s; 1750s
- See also: Other events of 1739; List of years in Denmark

Events from the year 1739 in Denmark.

== Incumbents ==
- Monarch – Christian VI
- Prime minister – Johan Ludvig Holstein-Ledreborg

== Events ==
- 28 November – Hørsholm is incorporated as a market town.

=== Undated ===
- Johan Ludvig Holstein constructs Ledrebrog's new main building near Lejre.

== Births ==
- 10 May – Andreas Henrik Stibolt, naval officer (died 1821)

Full date missing

- Thomas de Malleville, colonial administrator (died 1798)

== Deaths ==
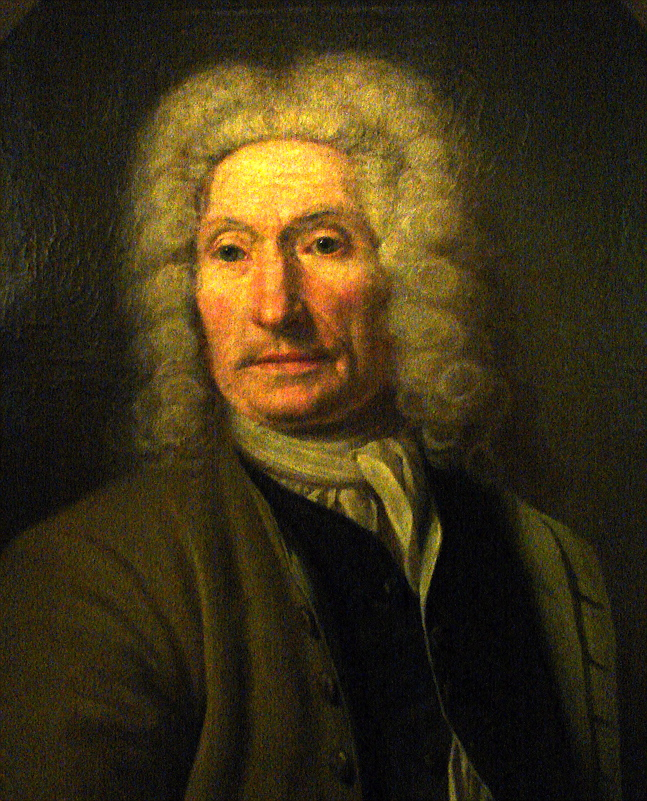
Magnus Berg

- 31 March – Magnus Berg, woodcarver, sculptor, painter (born 1666).
- 3 September – Sixtus Aspach, titular bishop (born 1672)
