= 1672 in Norway =

- Centuries: 16th; 17th; 18th; 19th
- Decades: 1650s; 1660s; 1670s; 1680s; 1690s
- See also: 1672 in Denmark; List of years in Norway

Events in the year 1672 in Norway.

== Incumbents ==
- Monarch: Christian V.

== Events ==
- Christiansholm Fortress was built.

== Births ==
- Sara Hammond, landowner and businesswoman (died 1716).

== Deaths ==
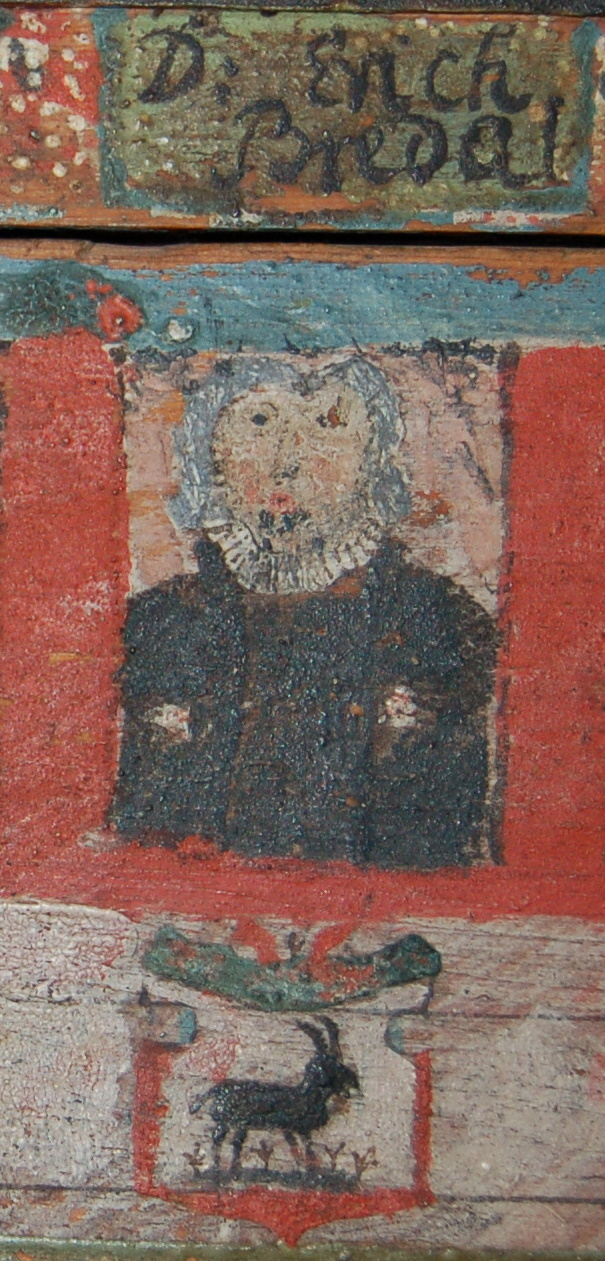
Erik Bredal, painted by Sigvard Kildal

- 18 May – Erik Bredal, bishop (born 1608).
