= 1676 in Norway =

- Centuries: 16th; 17th; 18th; 19th
- Decades: 1650s; 1660s; 1670s; 1680s; 1690s
- See also: 1676 in Denmark; List of years in Norway

Events in the year 1676 in Norway.

== Incumbents ==
- Monarch: Christian V.

== Events ==
- 8 June – Norwegian forces led by Ulrik Frederik Gyldenløve invades Bohuslen from Norway.
- 12 August – 16 September – Siege of Bohus Fortress.
- Jens Toller was ennobled, and given the noble family name Rosenheim.

== Deaths ==
- August – Niels Hanssøn Meng, timber trader and Mayor (born 1604).
