= 1602 in Norway =

- Centuries: 16th; 17th; 18th; 19th
- Decades: 1580s; 1590s; 1600s; 1610s; 1620s
- See also: 1602 in Denmark; List of years in Norway

Events in the year 1602 in Norway.

== Incumbents ==
- Monarch: Christian IV.

== Events ==
- Hamar Cathedral School merged with Oslo Cathedral School.

== Arts and literature ==
- Prestepina, a quiz book, is published for the first time. The book was a translation from German by Hallvard Gunnarssøn, and was later reissued numerous times, the last time in 1870.

== Births ==
- 12 April - Daniel Knudsen Bildt, military officer (d.1651)

== Deaths ==
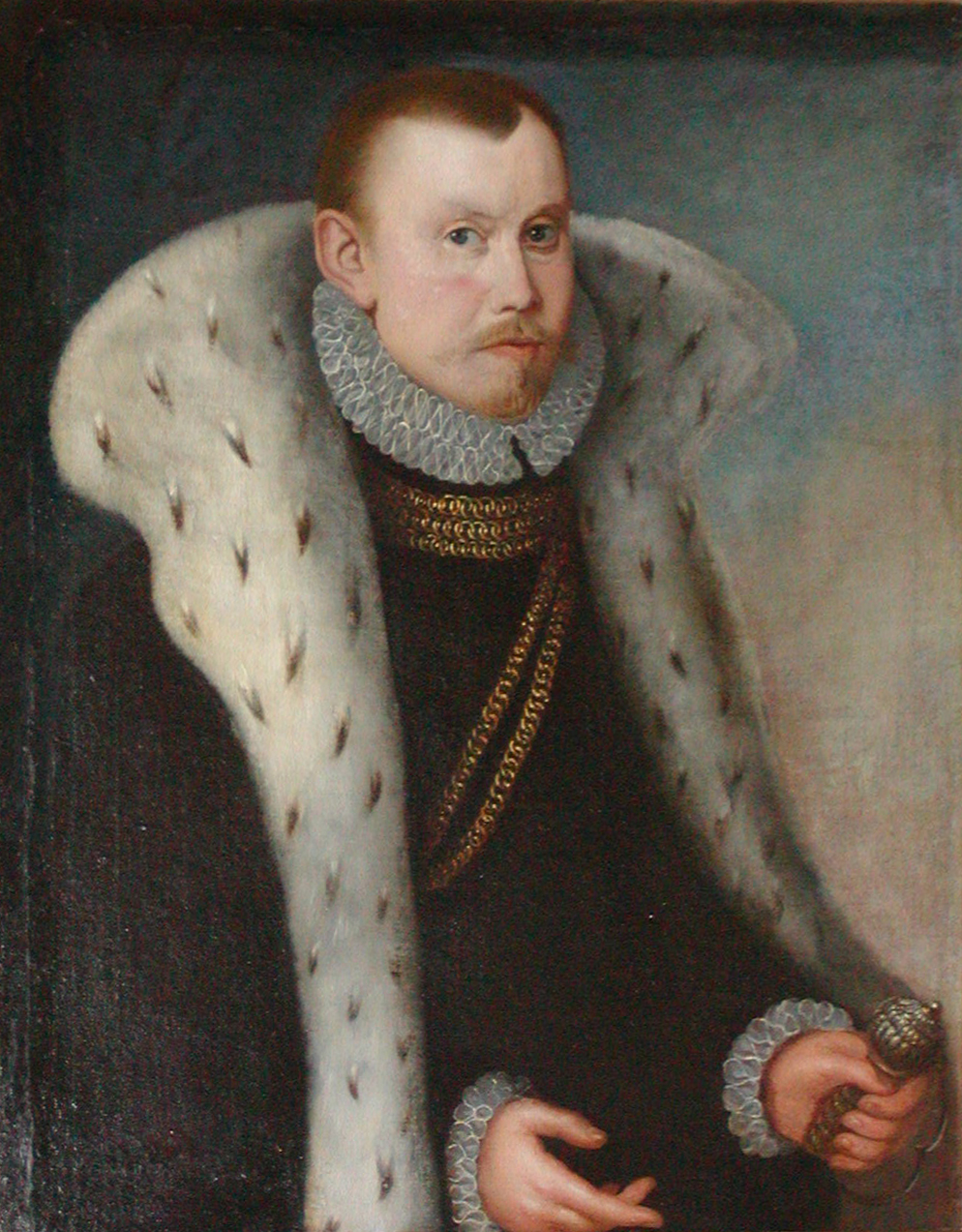
Ludvig Munk

- 8 April - Ludvig Munk, Stadtholder of Norway (b.1537)
