= Mortensson =

Mortensson is a surname, a cognate of Martins (surname). Notable people with the name include:

- Daniel Mortensson, early 20th-century Sami activist
- Ivar Mortensson-Egnund (1837-1954), Norwegian writer and anarchist
- Jacob Mortenssøn Maschius (1630-1678), Norwegian clergyman and poet
- Marja Mortensson (born 1995), South Sami singer from Norway
