= 1604 in Norway =

- Centuries: 16th; 17th; 18th; 19th
- Decades: 1580s; 1590s; 1600s; 1610s; 1620s
- See also: 1604 in Denmark; List of years in Norway

Events in the year 1604 in Norway.

== Incumbents ==
- Monarch: Christian IV.

== Events ==
- 24 July - Anders Lauritsson Green becomes Chancellor of Norway.
- 4 December:
  - Christian IV’s Norwegian Law of 1604 is issued, essentially as a translation into Danish of the older Norwegian law of Magnus law-mender established and recorded in Norwegian in 1274 and 1276.
  - Hiring anyone who had attended Jesuit schools in positions in schools and churches was made illegal.
- The town of Son is founded (lost town status in 1963).

== Births ==
- Niels Hanssøn Meng, timber trader and Mayor (died 1676).

== Deaths ==
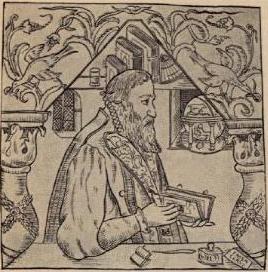
Rasmus Hjort

- 17 April – Rasmus Hjort, priest, humanist, educator (born c.1525).
