= 1679 in Norway =

- Centuries: 16th; 17th; 18th; 19th
- Decades: 1650s; 1660s; 1670s; 1680s; 1690s
- See also: 1679 in Denmark; List of years in Norway

Events in the year 1679 in Norway.

== Incumbents ==
- Monarch: Christian V.

== Events ==
- 16 March – The institution Chancellor of Norway is abolished, ending a tradition that had lasted for 400 years.
- August – The mining town of Røros was destroyed by Swedish troops..
- 26 September – The Peace of Lund ends the Gyldenløve War.
- December – Anne Løset was tried for alleged sorcery, convicted and executed by burning at Rovde.

== Deaths ==
- 16 March – Johan Frederik von Marschalck, the last Chancellor of Norway (born 1618).
- December – Anne Løset, alleged witch.
- Christen Bentsen Schaaning, clergyman. (born c. 1611).
