= 1661 in Norway =

- Centuries: 17th; 18th; 19th
- Decades: 1640s; 1650s; 1660s; 1670s; 1680s
- See also: 1661 in Denmark; List of years in Norway

Events in the year 1661 in Norway.

== Incumbents ==
- Monarch: Frederick III.

== Events ==
- 14 February - A common Supreme Court is established for Denmark–Norway.
- 7 August - The Sovereignty Act was signed by the estates of the realm, turning Norway into an absolute monarchy.
- September - Iver Krabbe is appointed Steward of Norway.
- The construction of Munkholmen fort is finished.

== Arts and literature ==
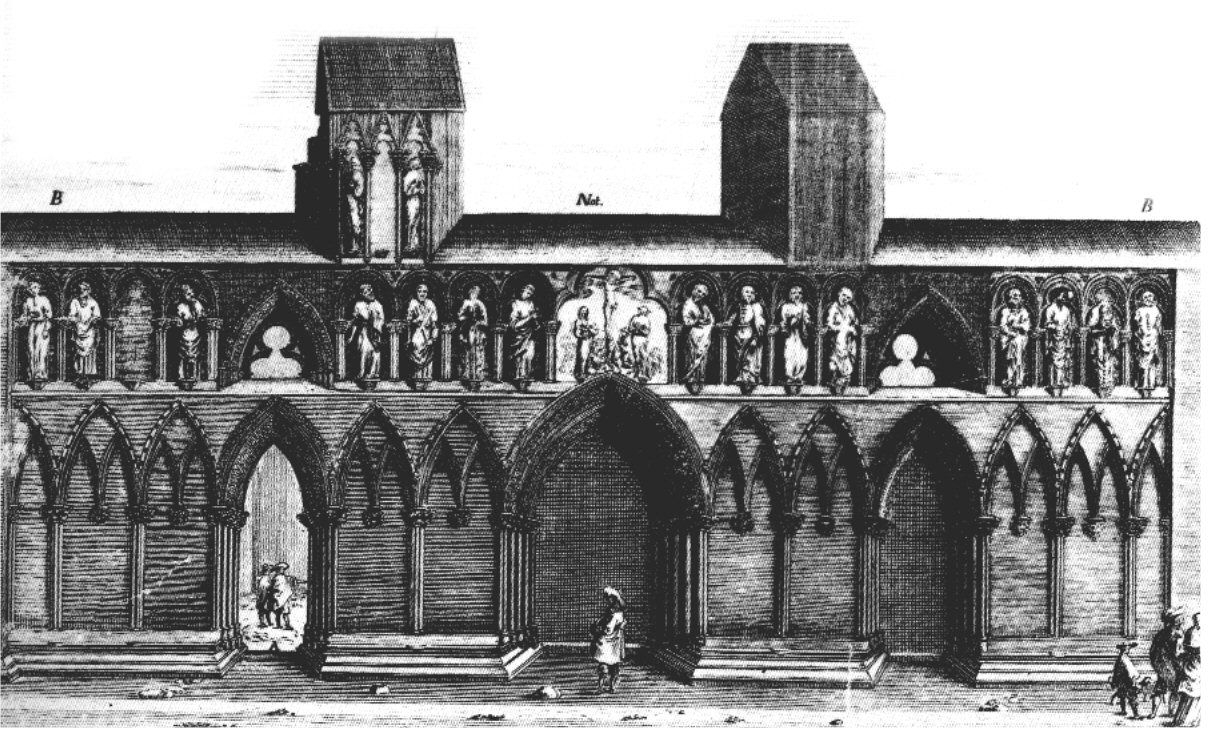
Copper engraving from Norwegia religiosa.

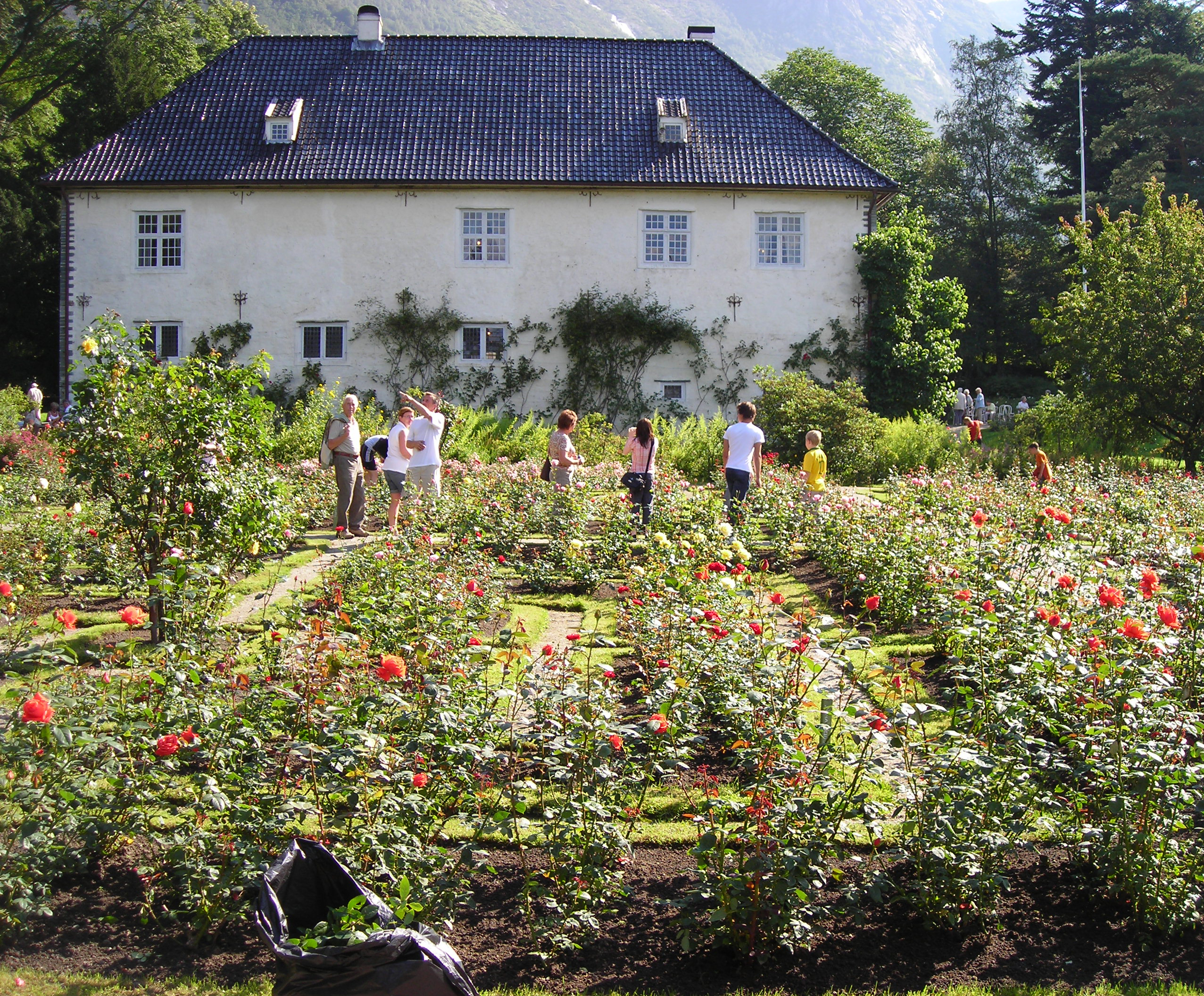
The Rosendal Manor.

- Jacob Maschius poetry book, Norwegia religiosa is published for the first time.

=== Architecture ===
- Construction of the Rosendal Manor started.

== Births ==
- 11 May – Niels Knagenhielm, civil servant, land owner and non-fiction writer (d. 1737).

== Deaths ==
- 27 January – Axel Mowat, admiral and land owner (born 1592).

=== Full date unknown ===
- Lauritz Galtung, admiral and land owner (b.c 1615).
