= 1666 in Norway =

- Centuries: 16th; 17th; 18th; 19th
- Decades: 1640s; 1650s; 1660s; 1670s; 1680s
- See also: 1666 in Denmark; List of years in Norway

Events in the year 1666 in Norway.

== Incumbents ==
- Monarch: Frederick III.

== Events ==
- 12 January - All the crown estates in Helgeland, Salten, Lofoten, Vesterålen, Andenes, Senja and Troms were given to Joachim Irgens von Westervick.
- July - Prince Christian was hailed as heir to the throne of Norway in Christiania.
- Ulrik Fredrik Gyldenløve was appointed commander-in-chief of the Norwegian army.
- The town of Kragerø was founded.

== Births ==
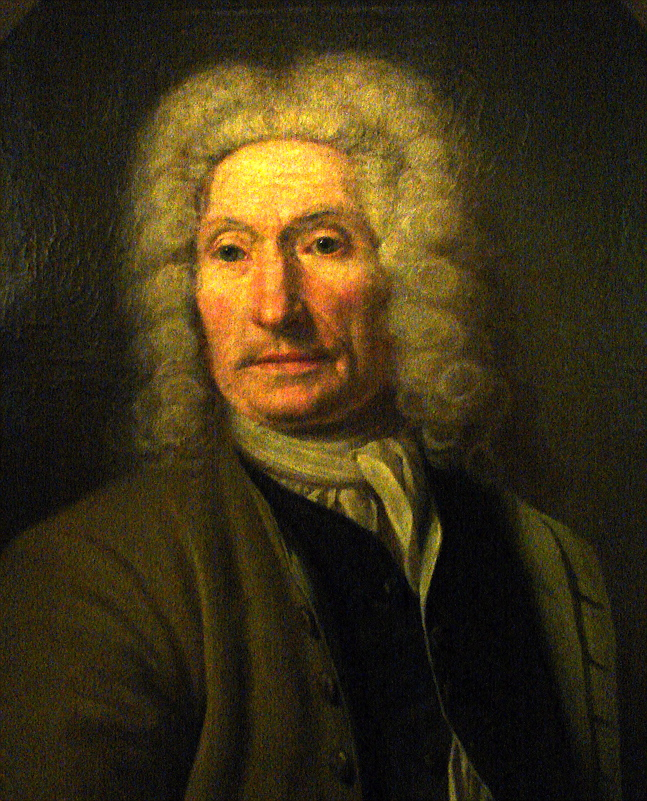
Magnus Berg

- 28 November – Magnus Berg, woodcarver, sculptor, painter (died 1739).
