= 1682 in Norway =

- Centuries: 16th; 17th; 18th; 19th
- Decades: 1660s; 1670s; 1680s; 1690s; 1700s
- See also: 1682 in Denmark; List of years in Norway

Events in the year 1682 in Norway.

== Incumbents ==
- Monarch: Christian V.

== Events ==
- Stavanger stiftamt headquarters was moved to the town of Christianssand and renamed Christianssand stiftamt.
- Kongsvinger Fortress was built.

== Births ==
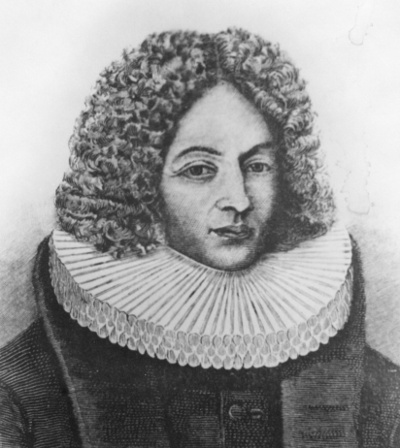
Thomas von Westen

- 13 September – Thomas von Westen, priest and missionary (died 1727).
- 2 October – Birgitte Christine Kaas, poet and translator of hymns (died 1761).

== Deaths ==
- 21 May - Reinhold von Hoven, military officer (b. c. 1610)

=== Full date unknown ===
- Paul Peterson Paus, priest and poet (b 1625).
- Werner Olsen, church builder (b. c. 1600).
