= 1674 in Norway =

- Centuries: 16th; 17th; 18th; 19th
- Decades: 1650s; 1660s; 1670s; 1680s; 1690s
- See also: 1674 in Denmark; List of years in Norway

Events in the year 1674 in Norway.

== Incumbents ==
- Monarch: Christian V.

== Events ==
- 12 October – Finn-Kirsten was executed by burning at the stake. She was the last person to be executed for witchcraft in Trøndelag.
- Johan Frederik von Marschalck was elected Chancellor of Norway. He served as the last Chancellor of Norway, until his death in 1679.

== Arts and literature ==
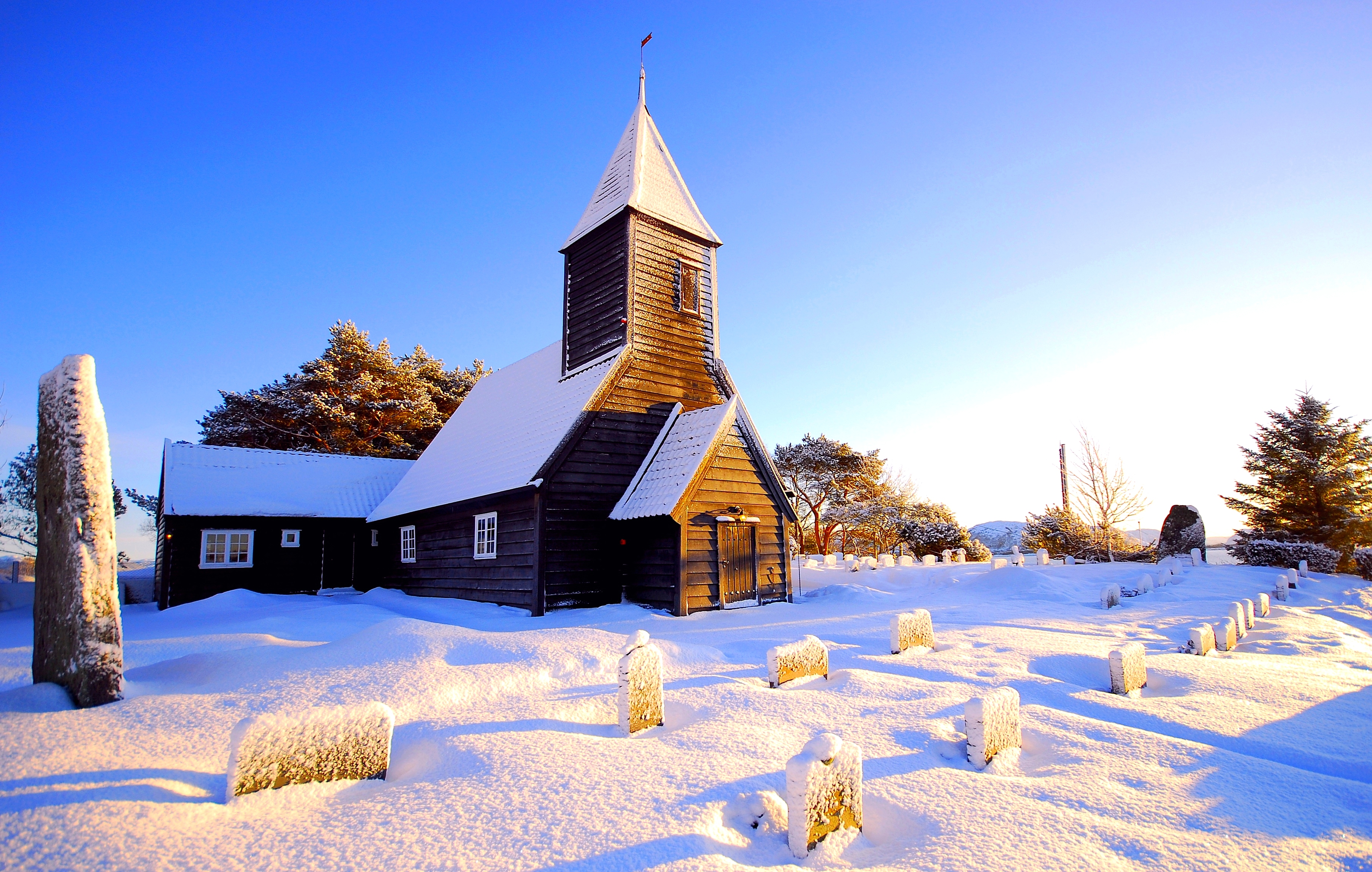
Vilnes Church

- Vilnes Church was built.
- Holmestrand Church was built.

== Deaths ==
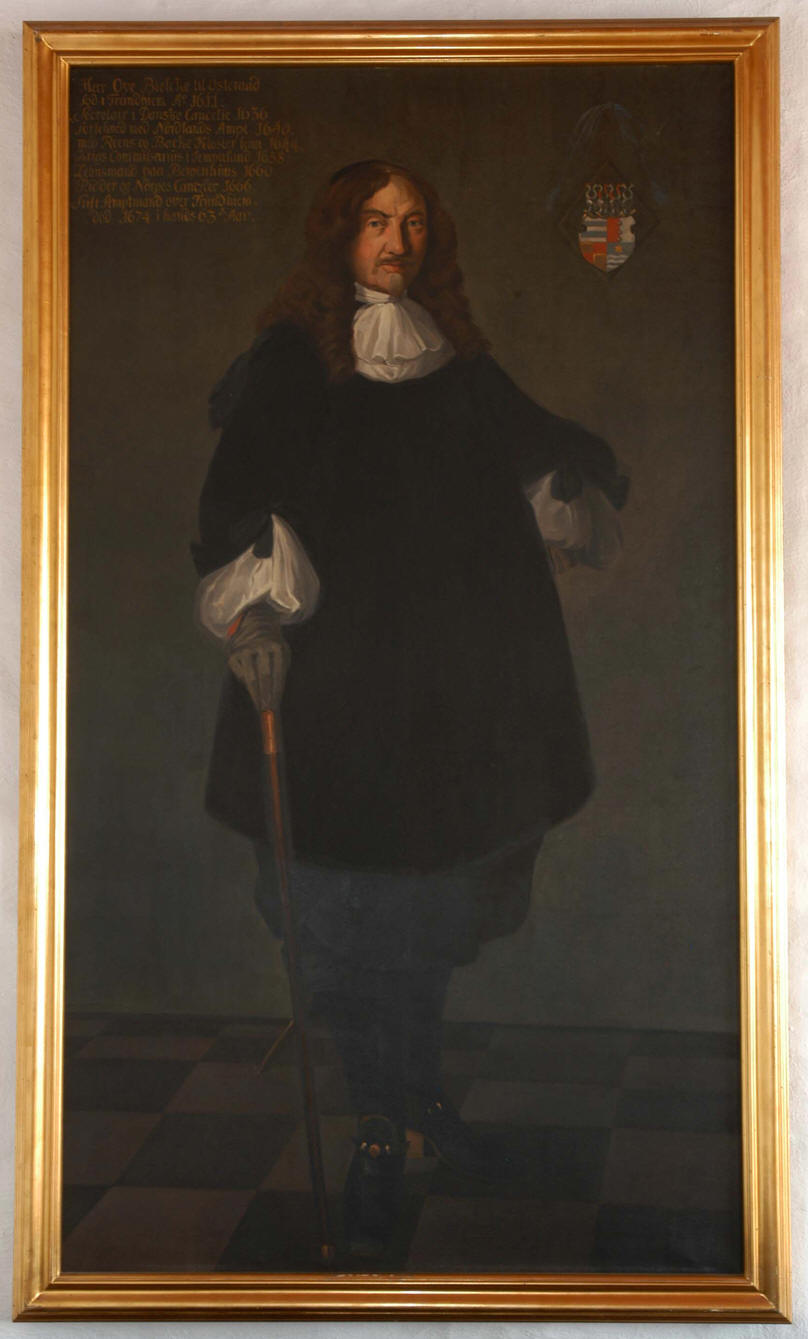
Ove Bjelke

- 29 March – Ove Bjelke, Chancellor of Norway (born 1611).
- 12 October – Finn-Kirsten, alleged witch.
