= 1601 in Norway =

- Centuries: 16th; 17th; 18th; 19th
- Decades: 1580s; 1590s; 1600s; 1610s; 1620s
- See also: 1601 in Denmark; List of years in Norway

Events in the year 1601 in Norway.

== Incumbents ==
- Monarch: Christian IV.

== Events ==
- Jørgen Friis was appointed Governor-General of Norway.

== Births ==
- Isak Lauritssøn Falck, merchant (died 1669).
