= 1670 in Norway =

- Centuries: 17th; 18th; 19th
- Decades: 1650s; 1660s; 1670s; 1680s; 1690s
- See also: 1670 in Denmark; List of years in Norway

Events in the year 1670 in Norway.

== Incumbents ==
- Monarch: Frederick III (until 9 February); then Christian V.

== Events ==
- September – Lisbet Nypan was executed by burning at the stake, while her husband Ole Nypan was beheaded, both in Trondheim.

== Arts and literature ==
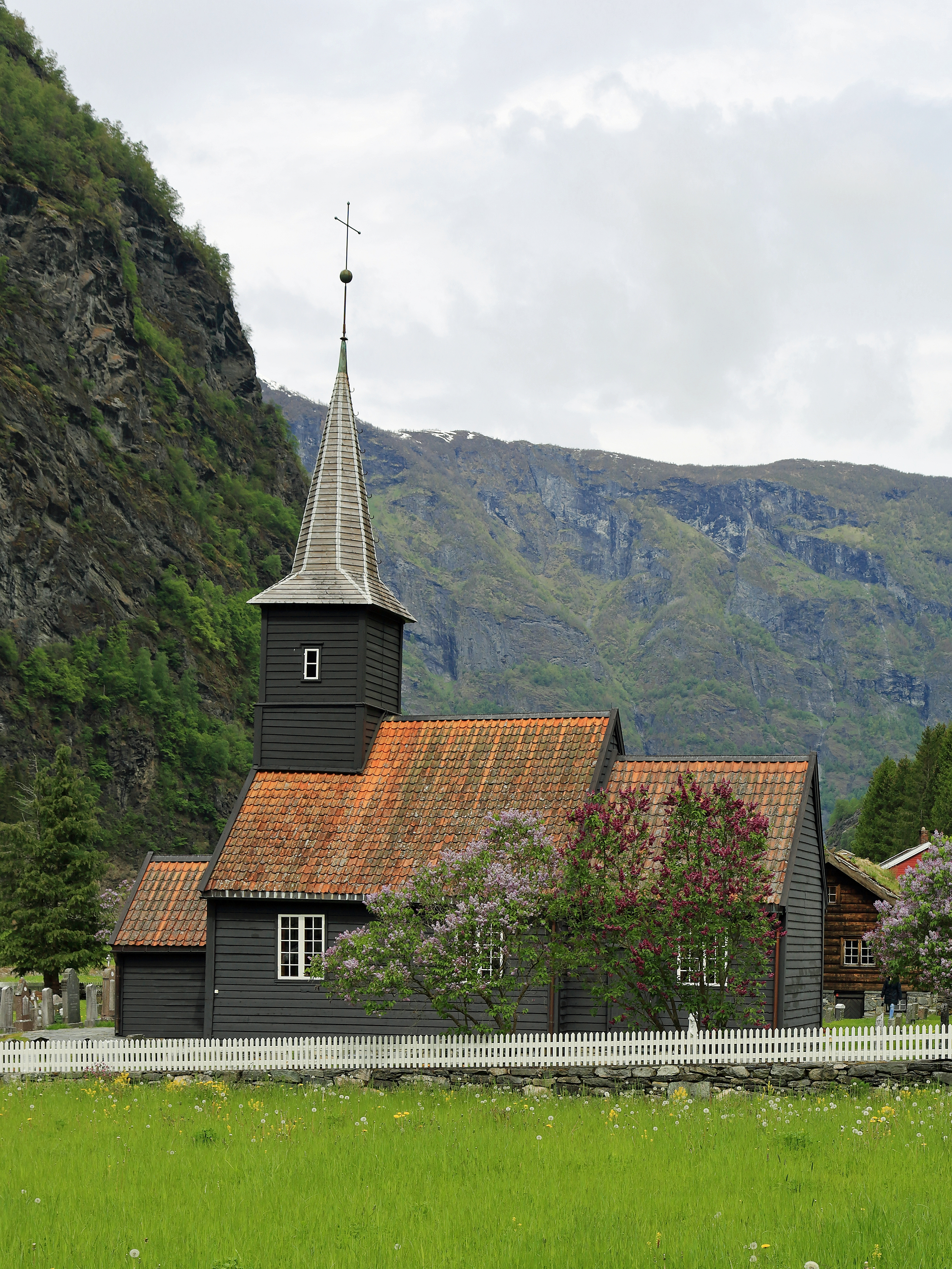
Flåm Church (2022)

- Bakke Church was built.
- Flåm Church was built.

== Births ==
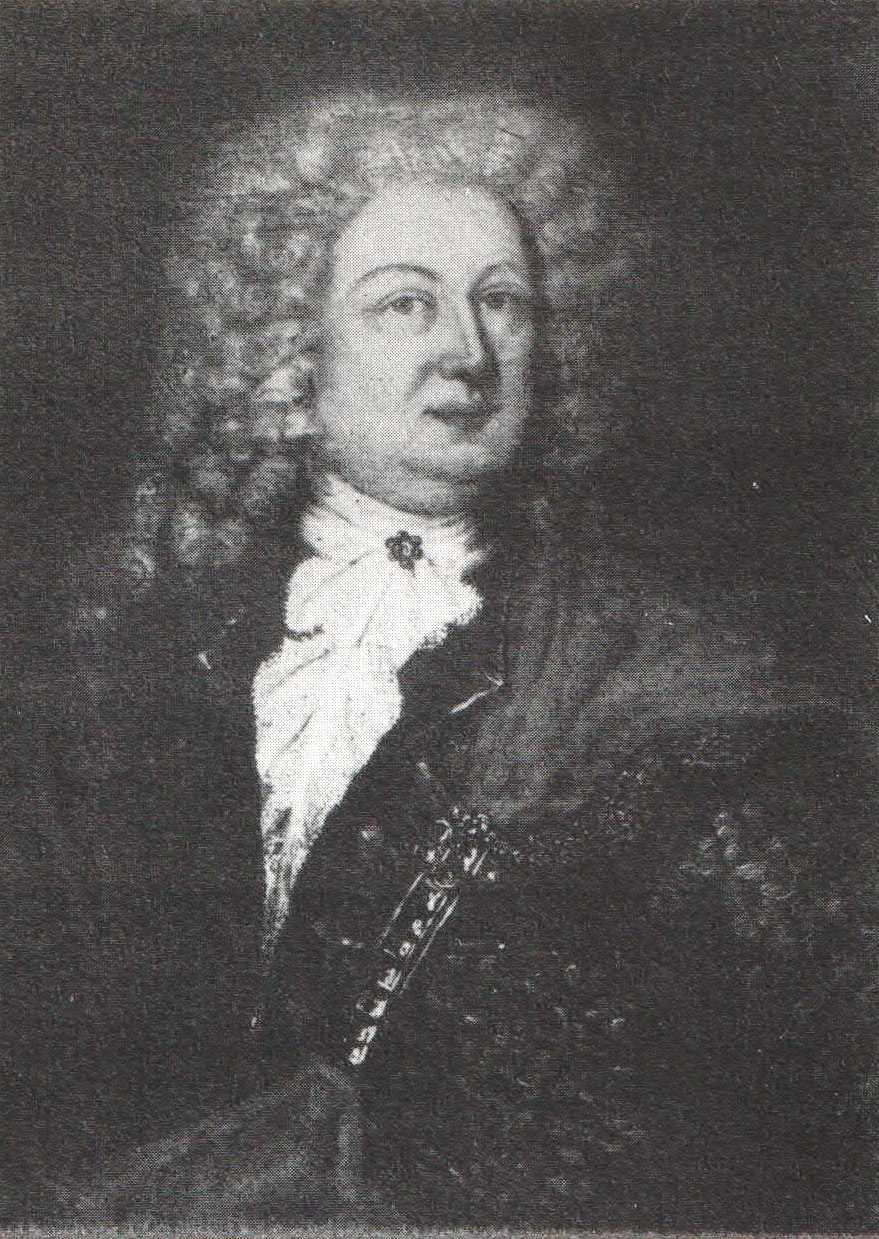
Axel Rosenkrantz

- 12 December – Axel Rosenkrantz, landowner, baron and civil servant (d 1723).

== Deaths ==
- September – Lisbet Nypan, alleged witch (born c.1610).
