= 1664 in Norway =

- Centuries: 16th; 17th; 18th; 19th
- Decades: 1640s; 1650s; 1660s; 1670s; 1680s
- See also: 1664 in Denmark; List of years in Norway

Events in the year 1664 in Norway.

== Incumbents ==
- Monarch: Frederick III.

== Events ==
- January – Ulrik Frederik Gyldenløve is appointed Steward of Norway.
- Herredag, the highest court in Norway, was abolished.

== Births ==
- 11 March – Jørgen Otto Brockenhuus, military officer (died 1728)
- 10 May – Tørres Christensen, merchant, ship owner, land owner (died 1721).

== Deaths ==
- 5 February – Henning Stockfleth, clergyman (born 1610).
- 19 February – Hans Stockfleth, civil servant.
