= 1669 in Norway =

- Centuries: 16th; 17th; 18th; 19th
- Decades: 1640s; 1650s; 1660s; 1670s; 1680s
- See also: 1669 in Denmark; List of years in Norway

Events in the year 1669 in Norway.

== Incumbents ==
- Monarch: Frederick III.

== Events ==
- Ove Juul was appointed Vice Governor-general of Norway under Governor-general Ulrik Fredrik Gyldenløve.

== Arts and literature ==
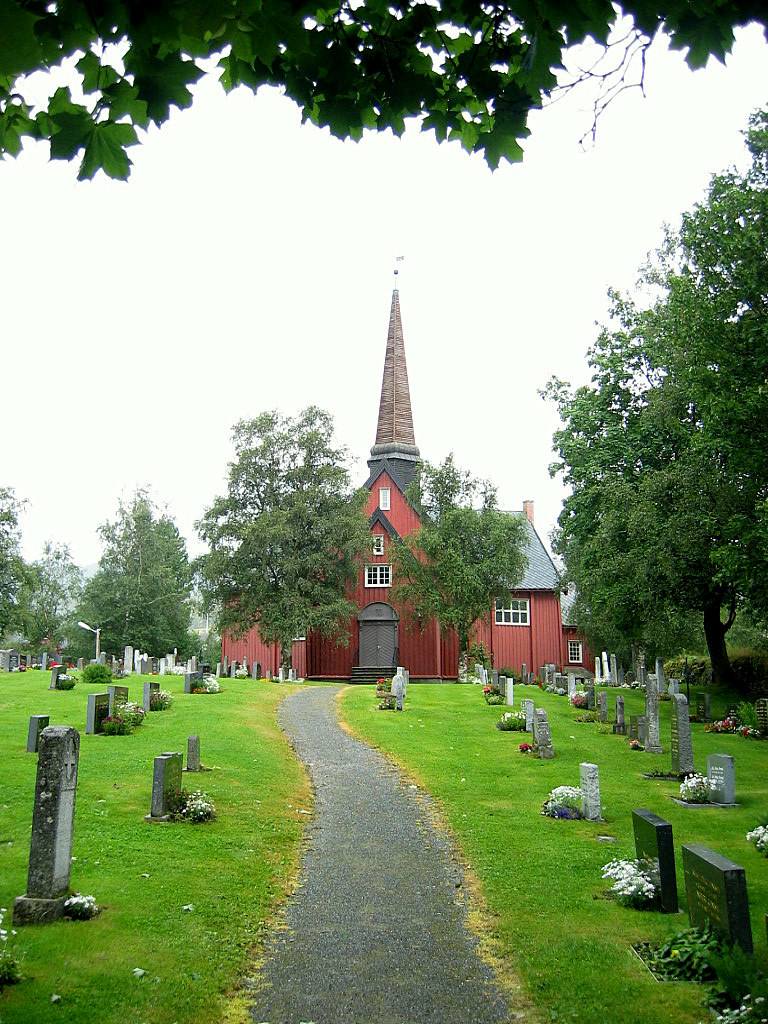
Rennebu Church

- Rennebu Church was built.

== Deaths ==
- 9 March – Isak Lauritssøn Falck, merchant (born 1601).
