= 1663 in Norway =

- Centuries: 16th; 17th; 18th; 19th
- Decades: 1640s; 1650s; 1660s; 1670s; 1680s
- See also: 1663 in Denmark; List of years in Norway

Events in the year 1663 in Norway.

== Incumbents ==
- Monarch: Frederick III.

== Events ==
- Vardø witch trials:
  - 27 February - Ellen Gundersdatter and Sigrid Jonsdatter were burned to death.
  - 20 March - Sølvi Nilsdatter, Margrette Jonsdatter, and two more women were burned to death.
  - 8 April - Barbra Olsdatter from Vadsø and four other women were burned to death, the last to be burned in the Vardø witch trials.

== Deaths ==
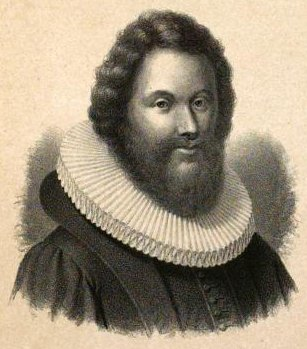
Kjeld Stub

- 20 March – Selius Marselis, tradesman (b. 1600)
- 20 April – Kjeld Stub, priest (b. 1607).
