= 1681 in Norway =

- Centuries: 16th; 17th; 18th; 19th
- Decades: 1660s; 1670s; 1680s; 1690s; 1700s
- See also: 1681 in Denmark; List of years in Norway

Events in the year 1681 in Norway.

== Incumbents ==
- Monarch: Christian V.

== Events ==
- 18–19 April – The 1681 Trondheim fire.
- The construction of Kristiansten Fortress starts.

== Deaths ==
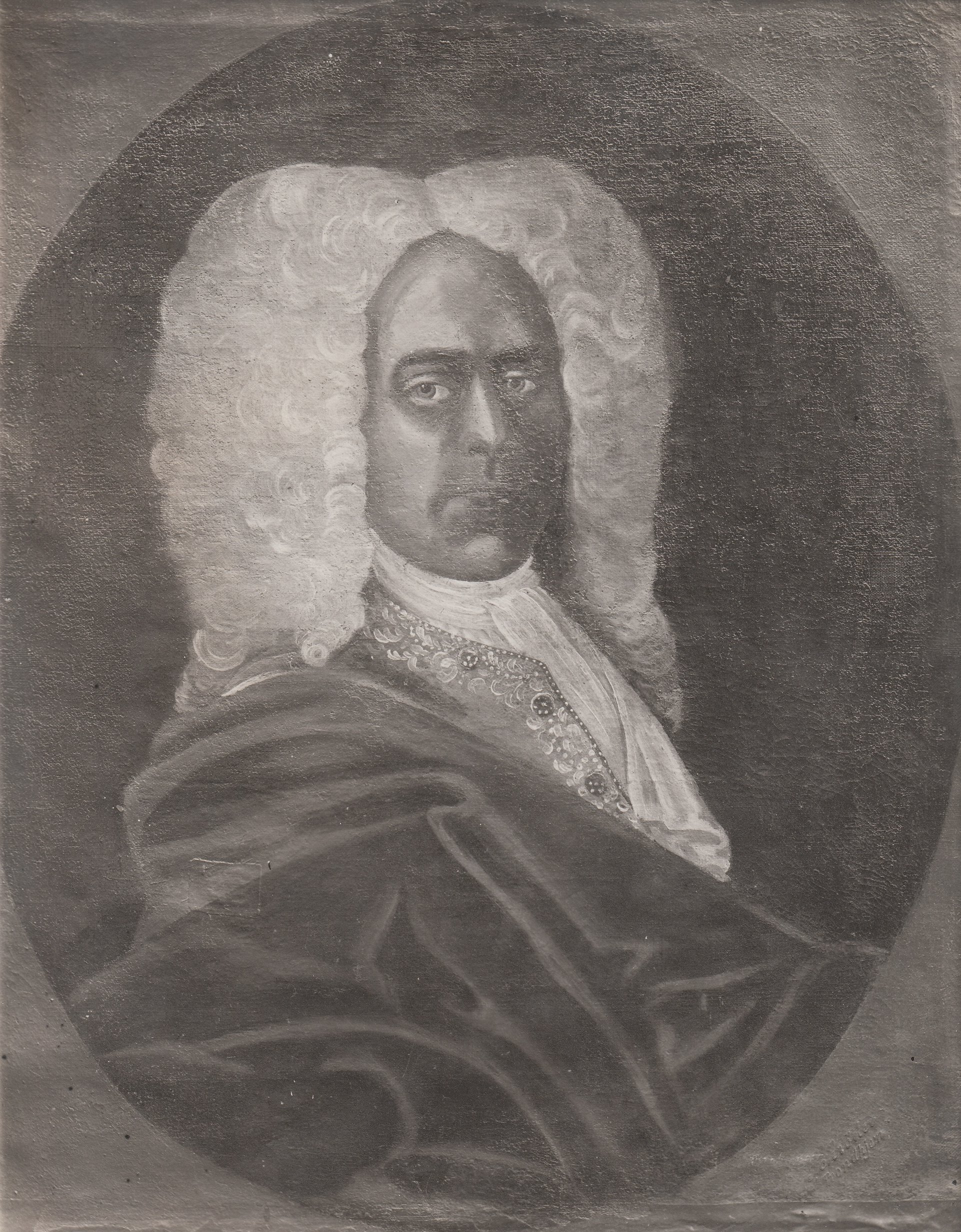
Thomas Hammond

- April – Thomas Hammond, merchant and landowner (born 1630).
