= 1673 in Norway =

- Centuries: 17th; 18th; 19th
- Decades: 1650s; 1660s; 1670s; 1680s; 1690s
- See also: 1673 in Denmark; List of years in Norway

Events in the year 1673 in Norway.

== Incumbents ==
- Monarch: Christian V.

== Events ==
- 26 November - King Christian V established the Countship of Jarlsberg.

== Arts and literature ==
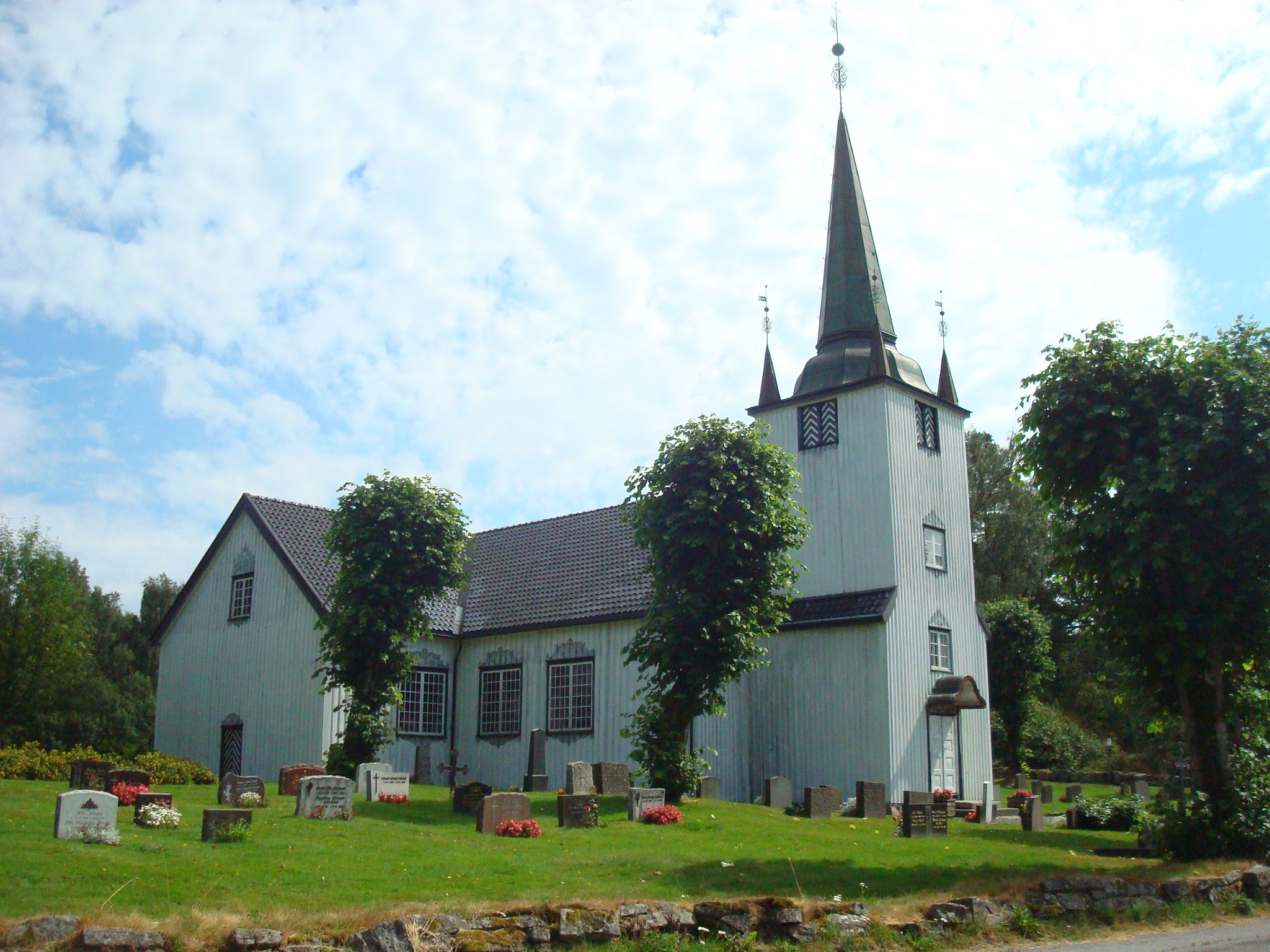
Austre Moland kirke

- Austre Moland Church was built.
- Leinstrand Church was built.

== Births ==
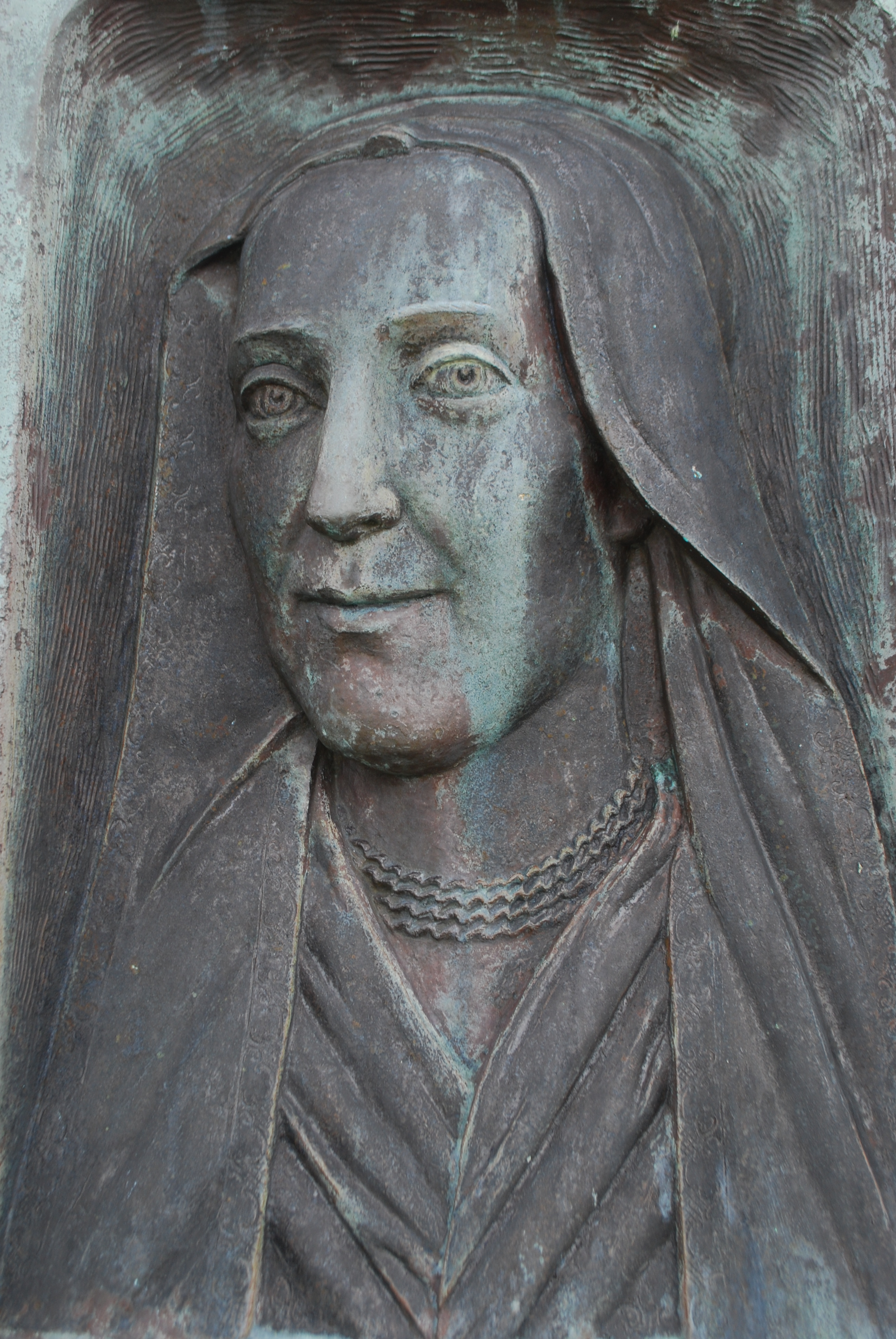
Gertrud Rask

- Povel Juel, civil servant and writer (d. 1723).
- Gertrud Rask, missionary (d 1735).
