= 1671 in Norway =

- Centuries: 16th; 17th; 18th; 19th
- Decades: 1650s; 1660s; 1670s; 1680s; 1690s
- See also: 1671 in Denmark; List of years in Norway

Events in the year 1671 in Norway:

== Incumbents ==
- Monarch: Christian V

== Events ==
- 29 September - King Christian V established the Countship of Larvik.
- Agdesiden amt was divided into Lister og Mandals amt and Nedenæs amt.
- The city of Laurvig (now spelled Larvik) was founded by Ulrik Fredrik Gyldenløve, the first count of Laurvig.

== Arts and literature ==
- The second Kvam Church was built.
