= 1662 in Norway =

- Centuries: 16th; 17th; 18th; 19th
- Decades: 1640s; 1650s; 1660s; 1670s; 1680s
- See also: 1662 in Denmark; List of years in Norway

Events in the year 1662 in Norway.

== Incumbents ==
- Monarch: Frederick III.

== Events ==
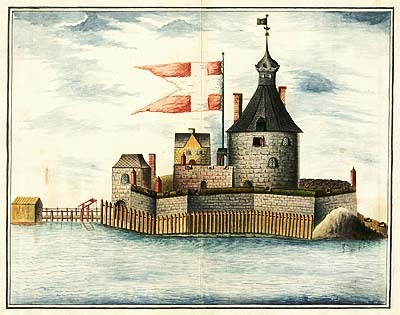
The Fredriksholm Fortress

- 19 February - A royal decree introduces the subdivision Amt as a replacement for the len subdivision.
- Vardø witch trials:
  - 2 September - The trials begin.
  - 6 November - Dorte Laurtitsdatter, Maren Sigvaldsdatter and Marit Rasmusdatter from Vadsø, and Ragnhild Klemetsdatter, Maren Mogensdatter and Marit Hemingsdatter from Ekkerøy, were all burned to death for witchcraft.
- Fredriksholm Fortress is established.

== Births ==
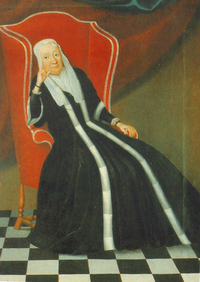
Karen Toller

- Karen Toller, estate owner and ship owner (died 1742).
