= 1665 in Norway =

- Centuries: 16th; 17th; 18th; 19th
- Decades: 1640s; 1650s; 1660s; 1670s; 1680s
- See also: 1665 in Denmark; List of years in Norway

Events in the year 1665 in Norway:

== Incumbents ==
- Monarch: Frederick III

== Events ==
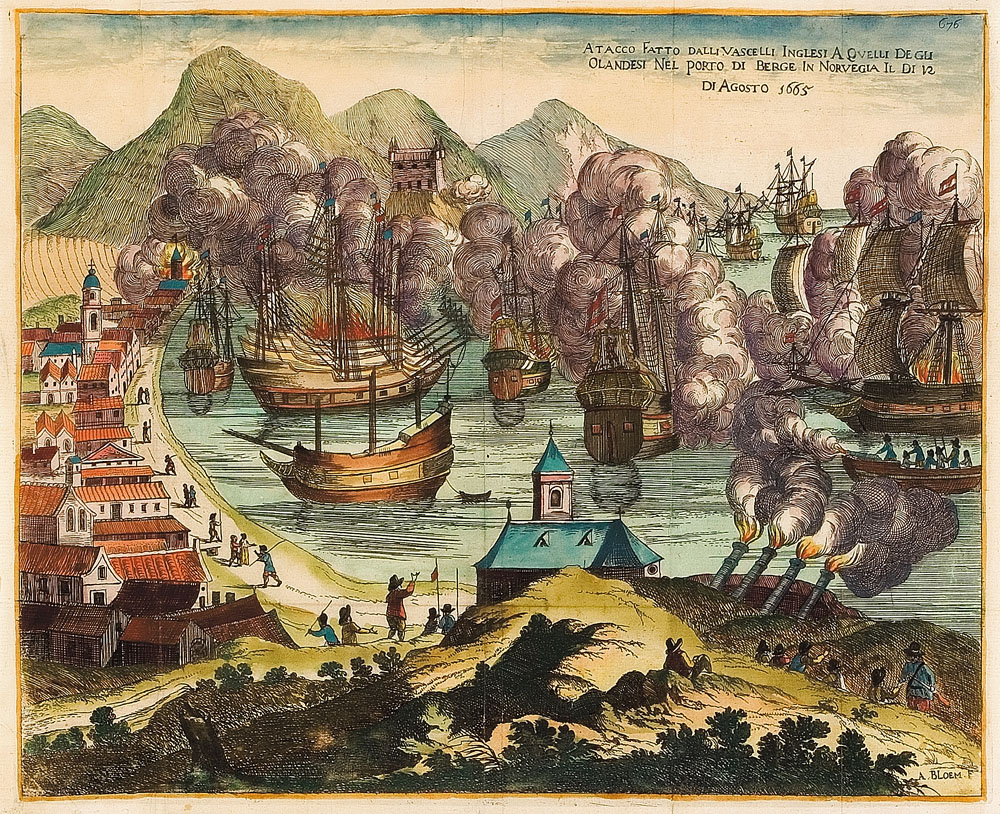
Battle of Vågen

- 2 August – The Battle of Vågen, Bergen, a naval battle between an English flotilla of warships and a Dutch merchant and treasure fleet, as part of the Second Anglo-Dutch War.
- 14 November – The King's Law or Lex Regia (Danish and Norwegian: Kongeloven) was introduced.
- Næs Iron Works starts to operate, it is operated from 1665 to 1959.
- The town of Fredrikshald is founded (now known simply as Halden).

== Arts and literature ==
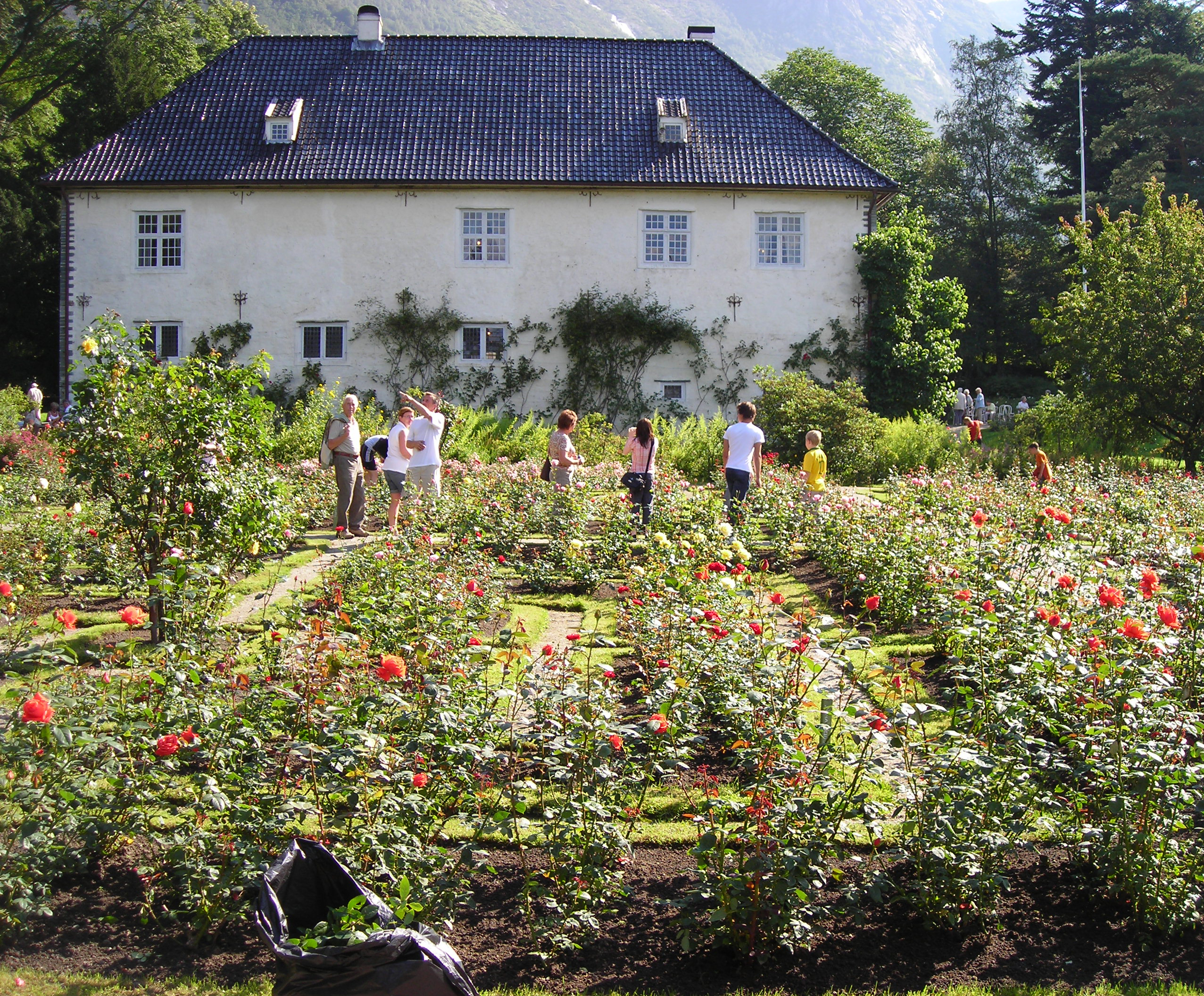
The Rosendal Manor.

- The construction of Rosendal Manor was finished.

== Births ==
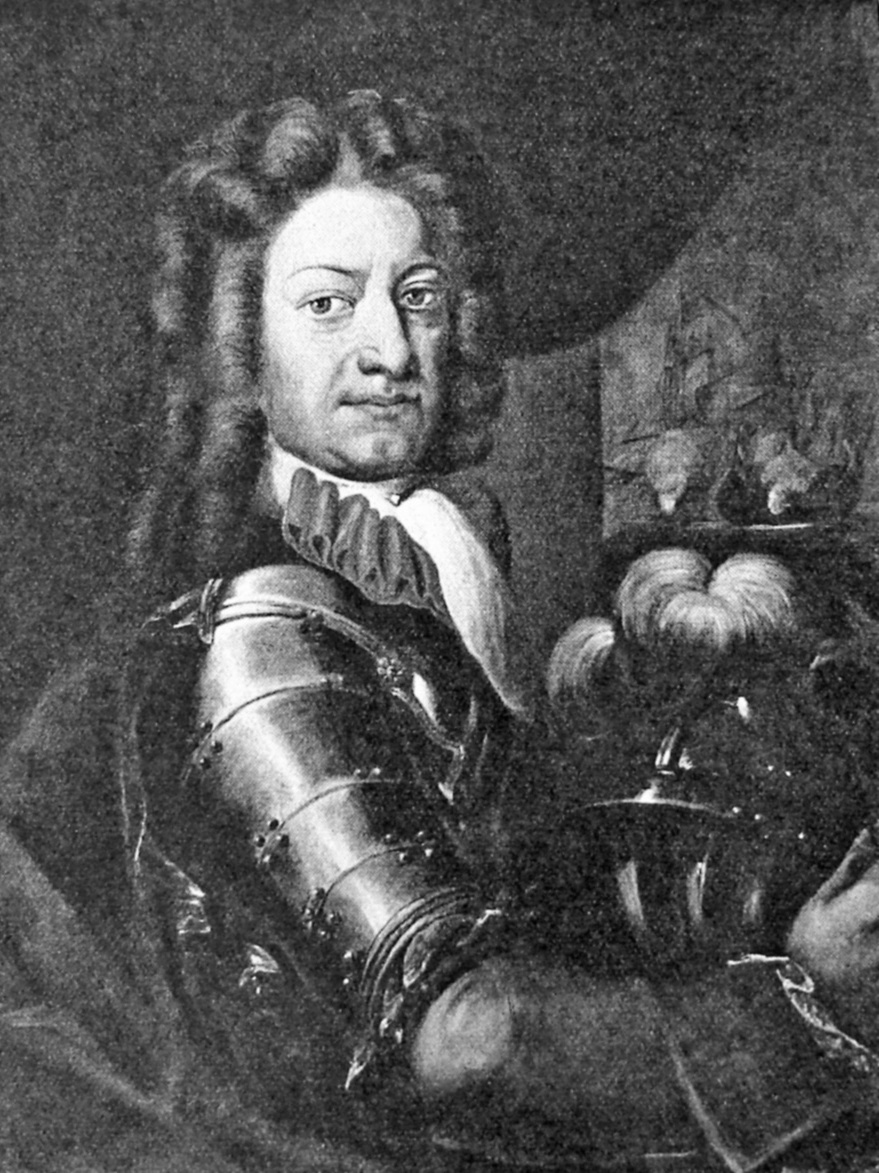
Iver Huitfeldt

- 5 December – Iver Huitfeldt, naval officer (d.1710).
