= 1675 in Norway =

- Centuries: 16th; 17th; 18th; 19th
- Decades: 1650s; 1660s; 1670s; 1680s; 1690s
- See also: 1675 in Denmark; List of years in Norway

Events in the year 1675 in Norway.

== Incumbents ==
- Monarch: Christian V.

== Events ==
- 15 September – The Gyldenløve War starts.

== Births ==
- Cille Gad, poet and culture personality (d.1711).

== Deaths ==
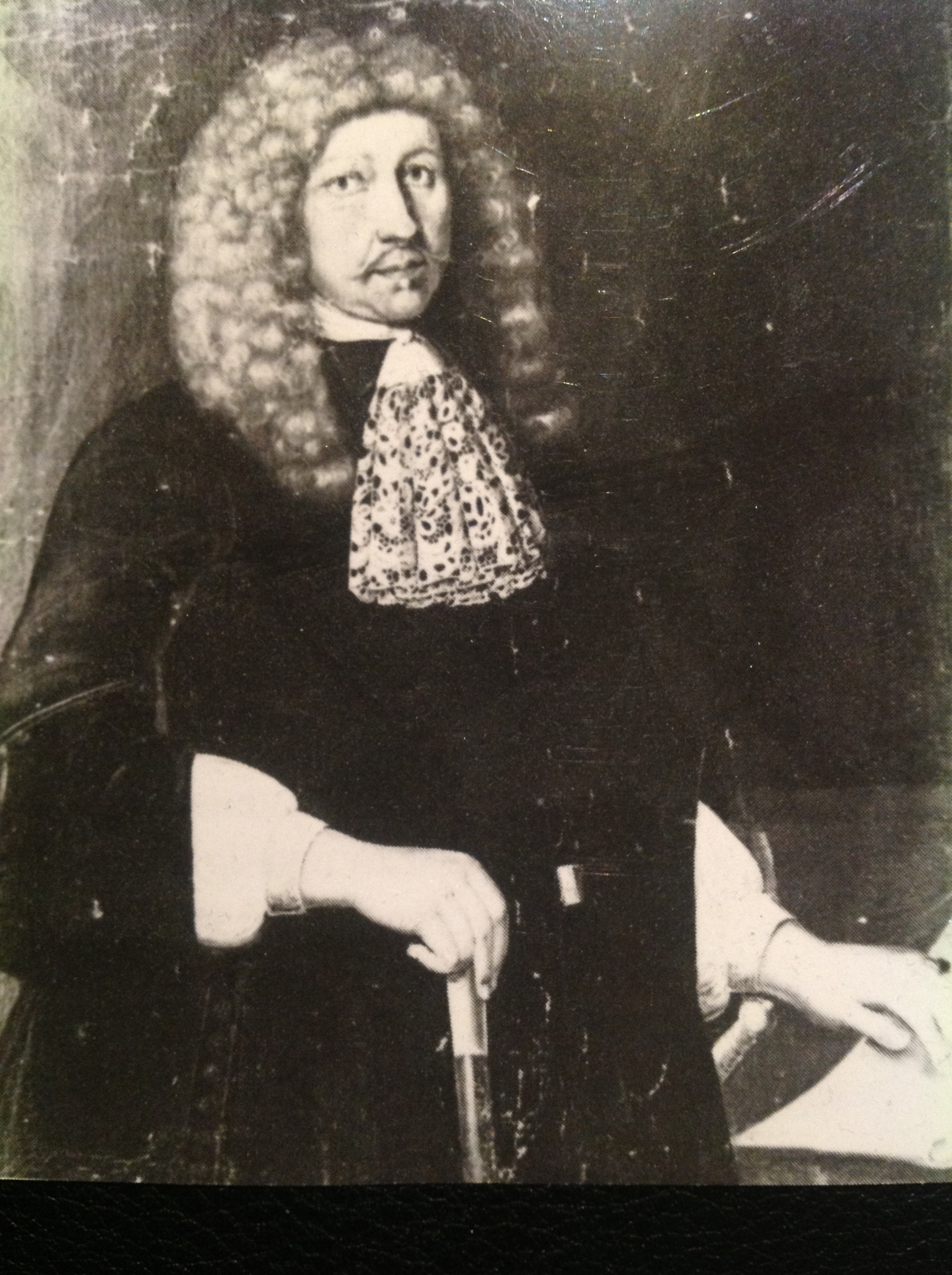
Preben von Ahnen

- 15 November – Preben von Ahnen, civil servant and landowner (born 1606).

=== Exact date missing ===
- Karen Mowat, heiress to the largest fortune in Western Norway (born c.1630).
