= 1680 in Norway =

- Centuries: 16th; 17th; 18th; 19th
- Decades: 1660s; 1670s; 1680s; 1690s; 1700s
- See also: 1680 in Denmark; List of years in Norway

Events in the year 1680 in Norway.

== Incumbents ==
- Monarch: Christian V.

== Events ==
- May - Peder Griffenfeld was imprisoned at Munkholmen, outside of Trondheim.
- A giant squid beached at the coast of Helgeland.
- Brevik is given town status as a ladested.

== Births ==
- 20 December - Anders Daae, priest and landowner (died 1763)

=== Around 1680 ===
- Lorentz Reichwein, military officer (died 1735)

== Deaths ==
- 29 December - Arent Berntsen, topographical-statistical author, businessman, banker, estate owner and councillor (born 1610)
