= 1667 in Norway =

- Centuries: 16th; 17th; 18th; 19th
- Decades: 1640s; 1650s; 1660s; 1670s; 1680s
- See also: 1667 in Denmark; List of years in Norway

Events in the year 1667 in Norway.

== Incumbents ==
- Monarch: Frederick III.

== Events ==
- Fredriksberg Fortress is established.
- Overhoffretten, the highest legal court in Norway, is established.

== Arts and literature ==
- Leksvik Church is built.

== Births ==
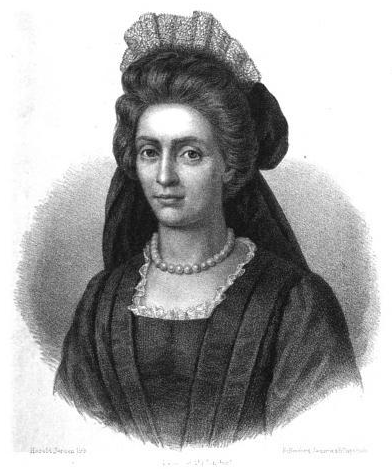
Anna Colbjørnsdatter

=== Full date unknown ===
- Anna Colbjørnsdatter, national heroine (d.1736)

== Deaths ==
- 5 May – Georg Reichwein, Sr., military officer (b. 1593),
