= 1683 in Norway =

- Centuries: 16th; 17th; 18th; 19th
- Decades: 1660s; 1670s; 1680s; 1690s; 1700s
- See also: 1683 in Denmark; List of years in Norway

Events in the year 1683 in Norway.

== Incumbents ==
- Monarch: Christian V.

== Events ==
- Christiansfjell Fortress was built.

== Births ==
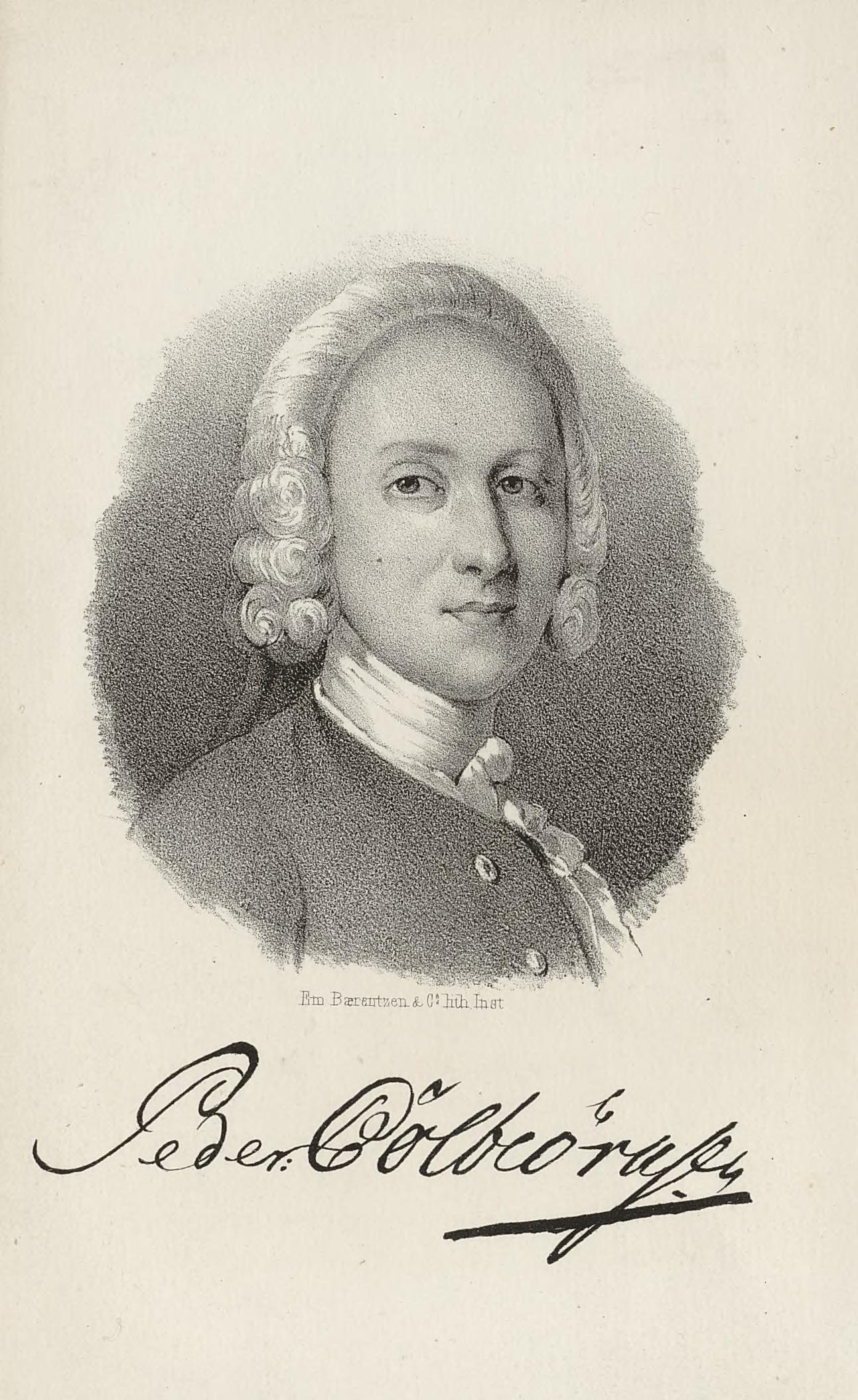
Peder Colbjørnsen

- 23 March – Anna Krefting, businesswoman (d. 1766).
- 5 July – Peder Colbjørnsen, timber merchant and war hero (d. 1738).
- 3 November – Iver Elieson, merchant (died 1753).
- Erik Bredal, governor (d.c 1741)
- Peter Bredal, vice admiral (d. 1756)
