= Reinhold von Hoven =

Danish-German Military Officer in Norwegian service

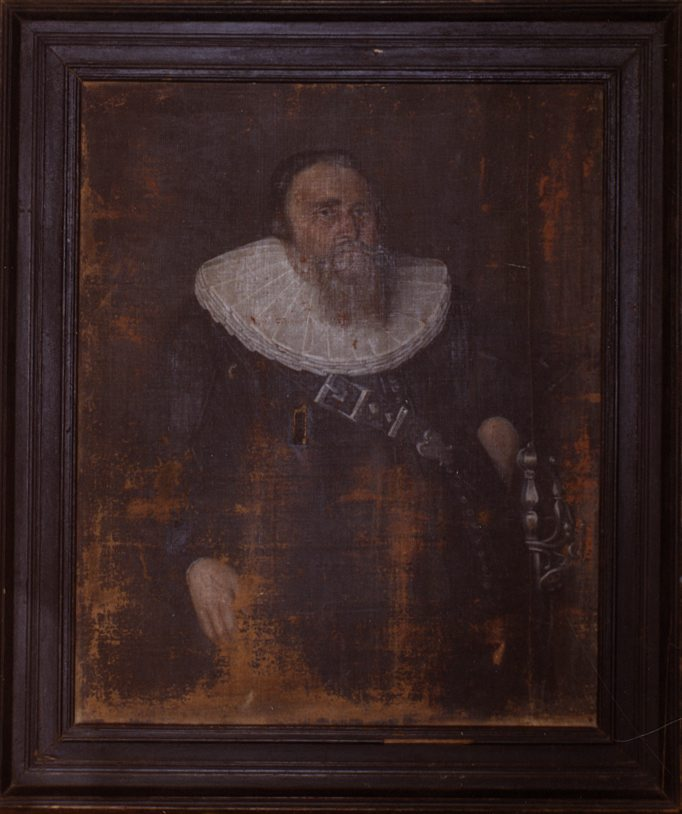
- Died: May 21, 1682 Vestnes, Romsdalen, Norway
- Allegiance: Denmark-Norway
- Conflicts: Second Northern War; Scanian War

Reinhold von Hoven (1607/1610/1614? – May 21, 1682) was a Danish-German Military Officer in Norwegian service.

Reinhold von Hoven was born on the island of Saaremaa in Livonia, then part of Danish Estonia. von Hoven started his military career as a major in Scania, at that time part of the Danish-Norwegian Realm.

Reinhold von Hoven came to Trondelag, Norway in 1649 where he became chief of the Snåsenske Ski Battalion. He was appointed as lieutenant colonel in the Trondhjemske Regimental unit of the Bergenhus Regiment in 1650. From 1658, he served as a colonel in the Bergenhusiske Infantry Regiment under General Jørgen Bjelke, commander-in-chief of the Norwegian army.

He participated in the attack on Jämtland in 1657 and the capture of Trøndelag in 1658. During the Scanian War (1675–1679), forces from the 1st and 2nd Thronhjemske Regiment invaded Jamtland and Harjedalen. The bastion led by Reinhold von Hoven held the Swedish fortification at Frösö (Frösö skanse) in Jämtland for several months. In 1673, he was appointed commander of the Trondhjemske Infantry Regiment in Trondheim.

== See also ==
- Jämtland campaign (1677)
- Gyldenløve War

== Bibliography ==
- Norsk militært Tidsskrift (in Norwegian). Vol. XXV. 1862. p. 485.
