= Larvik Church =

Church in Vestfold, Norway

- Larvik kirke
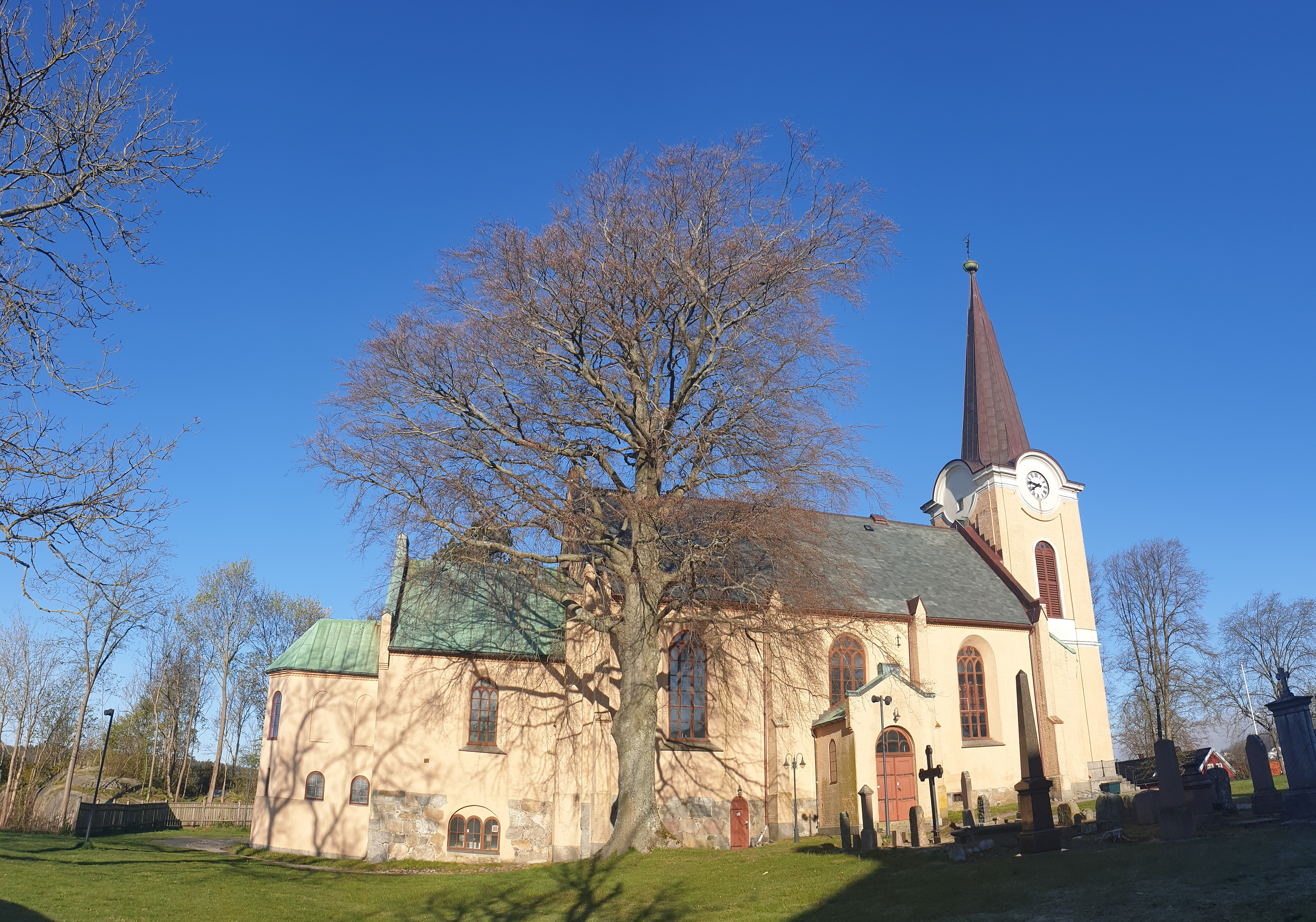
- View of the church
- Larvik Church
- 59°02′49″N 10°02′07″E
- Location: Larvik Municipality, Vestfold
- Country: Norway
- Denomination: Church of Norway
- Churchmanship: Evangelical Lutheran

History
- Status: Parish church
- Founded: 1677
- Consecrated: 1677

Architecture
- Functional status: Active
- Architectural type: Long church
- Completed: 1677 (349 years ago)

Specifications
- Capacity: 450
- Materials: Brick

Administration
- Diocese: Tunsberg
- Deanery: Larvik prosti
- Parish: Larvik
- Norwegian Cultural Heritage Site
- Type: Church
- Status: Automatically protected
- ID: 84911

Larvik Church (Norwegian: Larvik kirke) is a parish church of the Church of Norway in Larvik Municipality in Vestfold county, Norway. It is located in the town of Larvik, right along the shore of the Larviksfjorden. It is one of the churches for the Larvik parish and the seat of the Larvik prosti (deanery) in the Diocese of Tunsberg. The yellow, brick church was built in a long church design in 1677 using plans drawn up by an unknown architect. The church seats about 450 people.

== History ==
In 1671, the seaside village of Larvik was established as a kjøpstad (market town). Soon after this, Ulrik Frederik Gyldenløve applied to the King for permission to build a church in the new town. The new church was consecrated on 6 January 1677. The building was constructed as a long church using yellow brick. In 1706, the exterior was covered with a yellow plaster. In 1742, a sacristy was built on the southern end of the building. In 1762, a church porch with a large clock/bell tower was built at the main entrance to the nave.

In 1814, this church served as an election church (Norwegian: valgkirke). Together with more than 300 other parish churches across Norway, it was a polling station for elections to the 1814 Norwegian Constituent Assembly which wrote the Constitution of Norway. This was Norway's first national elections. Each church parish was a constituency that elected people called "electors" who later met together in each county to elect the representatives for the assembly that was to meet at Eidsvoll Manor later that year.

From 1859 to 1864, the church was rebuilt according to drawings by architect Christian Heinrich Grosch. This included a new neo-Gothic altarpiece and pulpit, new pews, and new second floor seating galleries. The most important change during this renovation was that external buttresses were built into the exterior walls in order to reinforce them. In 1906, the sacristy was enlarged. In the 1970s, the basement under the church was converted into a church hall.

== Gallery ==
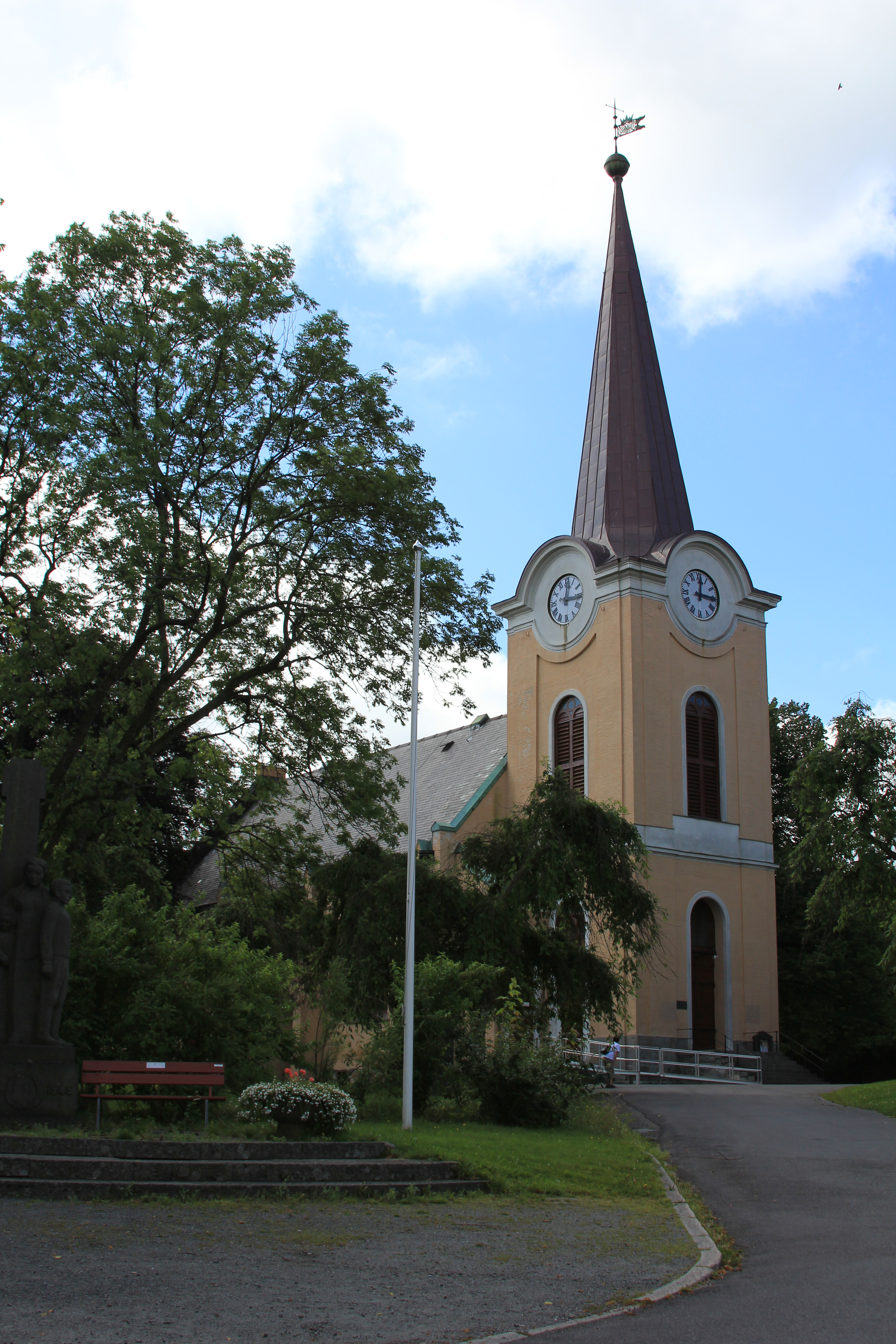

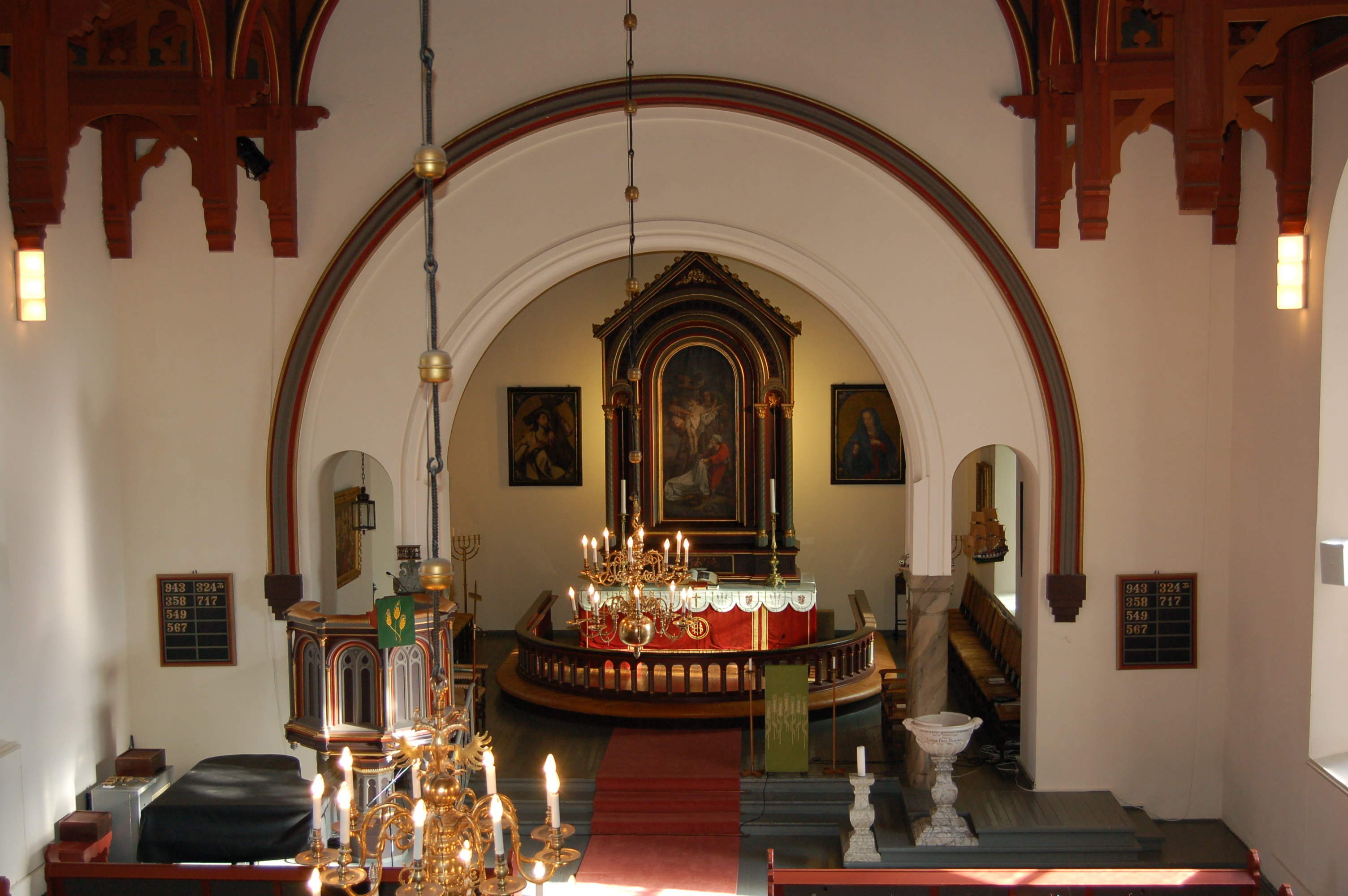

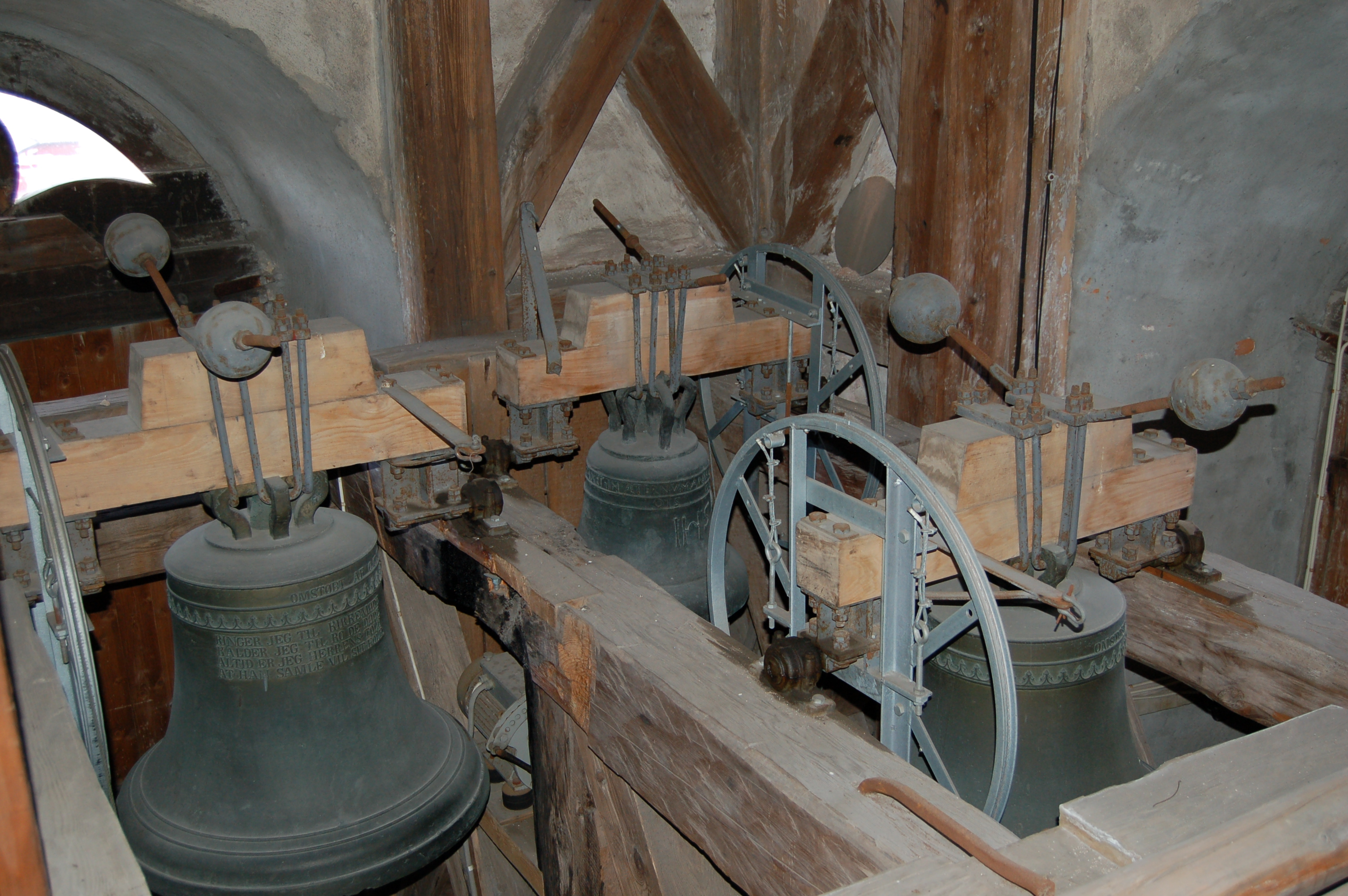

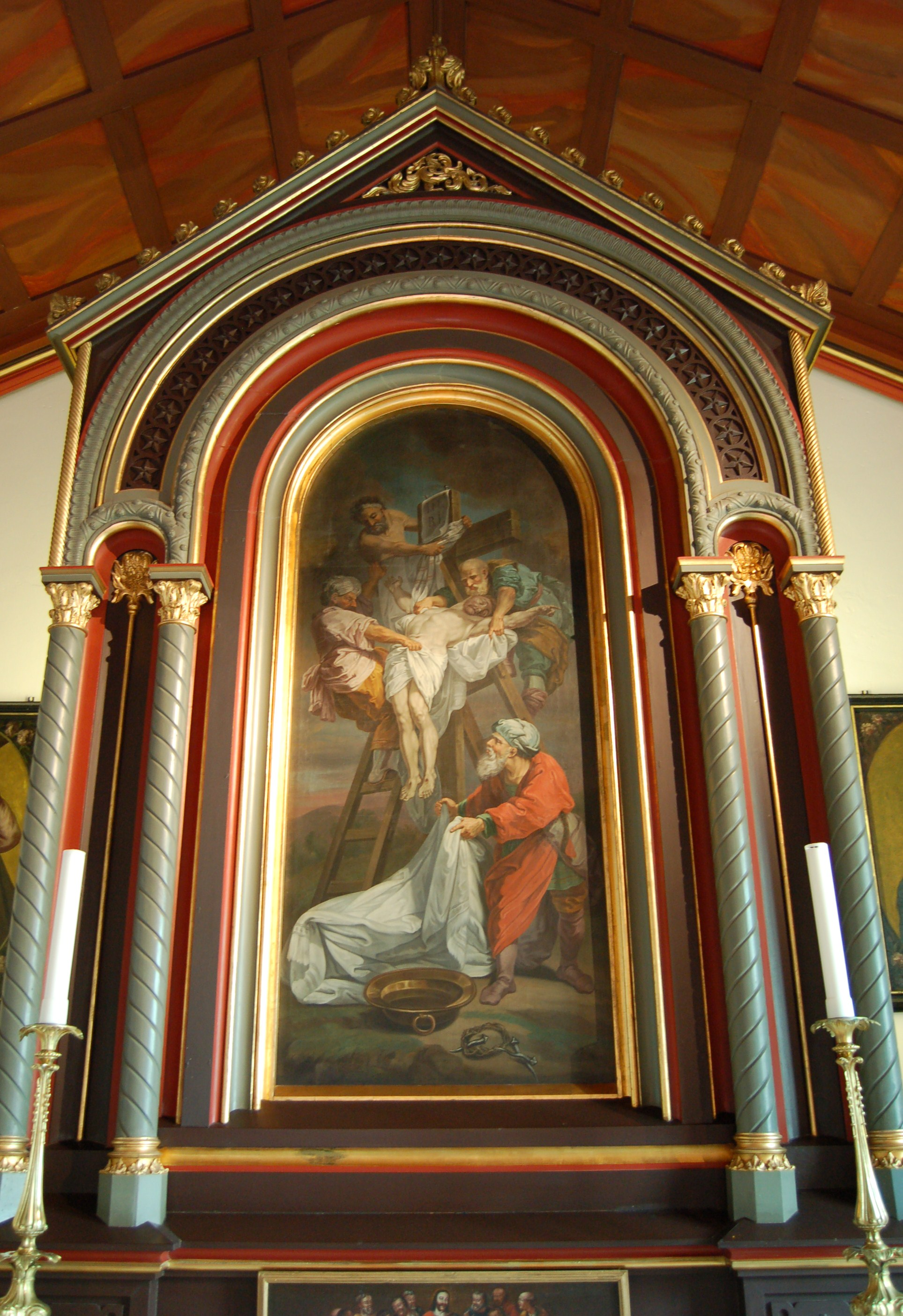

== See also ==
- List of churches in Tunsberg
