= Hallvard Gunnarssøn =

Norwegian educator and writer

- Born: c.1550 Sarpsborg, Norway
- Died: 1608
- Occupations: educator and writer

Hallvard Gunnarssøn (c.1550 – 1608) was a Norwegian educator and author.

Gunnarsson was born at Sarpsborg in Østfold. He was a pupil at the Oslo Cathedral School and later at the University of Rostock. He was enrolled in 1566 and took his magister degree in 1572. Later he also studied in Wittenberg. He lectured at the Oslo Cathedral School from 1577 until his death in 1608.

Among his theological works is Isagoge, a shortened version of the Bible written in Latin hexameter style. Other works are Flores Sapientiæ Divinæ and Piæ Precatiunculæ. He published several historical works written in Latin verses. His translation of a quiz book by the German priest Michael Saxe, first published in 1602, became very popular and was reissued several times. The book became known as Prestepina (literally, "the priest's torment"), as even priests had a hard time to give correct answers to the intricate biblical questions.
