= Anne Løset =

Norwegian woman tried for alleged sorcery

- Born: Probably Sunnmøre, Norway
- Died: December 1679; Rovde, Norway
- Cause of death: Executed by burning
- Known for: Alleged sorcery

Anne Mogensdotter Løset (died December 1679) was a Norwegian beggar woman who was tried for alleged sorcery, convicted and executed by burning.

== Background ==
She was probably born in Sunnmøre to Marit and Mogens Løset. What little is known about her life is gathered from records from the Thing gatherings in 1679. Løset was probably a widow who lived alone in Syvde in poverty, with a married adult daughter, Marit Jetmundsdatter, living in Nordfjord. To provide for herself, Løset travelled around farms in her local area to beg for alms. If she was refused, Løset would threaten them with evil and disease.

== Trial and execution ==
Her witchcraft trial began when one of her neighbours, Knut Olufsen Søfredal claimed that he had been cursed by Løset as she wanted revenge for him hitting her daughter. He alleged this resulted in him being ill and bedridden for three years. After more witnesses testified how she "stole the spark of life from him", further investigations were carried out.

Her next hearing was held in autumn 1679, with several villagers testifying about Løset's alleged witchcraft, with witnesses claiming that her grandmother had been burnt for witchcraft. Løset was also accused of having cursed people with disease. Witnesses also claimed that she healed cows. The distinction between black and white magic was considered fluid during Norwegian witch trials.

Throughout her trial, Løset strongly professed her innocence and often called on Jesus for help. However, her confessor Axel Olufsen convinced her to confess to save her soul and be subject to God's mercy. She made a full confession in December 1679 and claimed that her mother had taught her witchcraft and handed her over as a servant to Satan, who appeared to Løset as a beautiful servant boy and offered her a Devil's pact. She also claimed that she attended a Christmas Mass with Satan at Dovrefjell in 1678 along with four other women, who she also named.

Løset was executed by burning in December 1679 in Rovde.
