= Erik Bredal (bishop) =

Norwegian bishop (1608-1672)

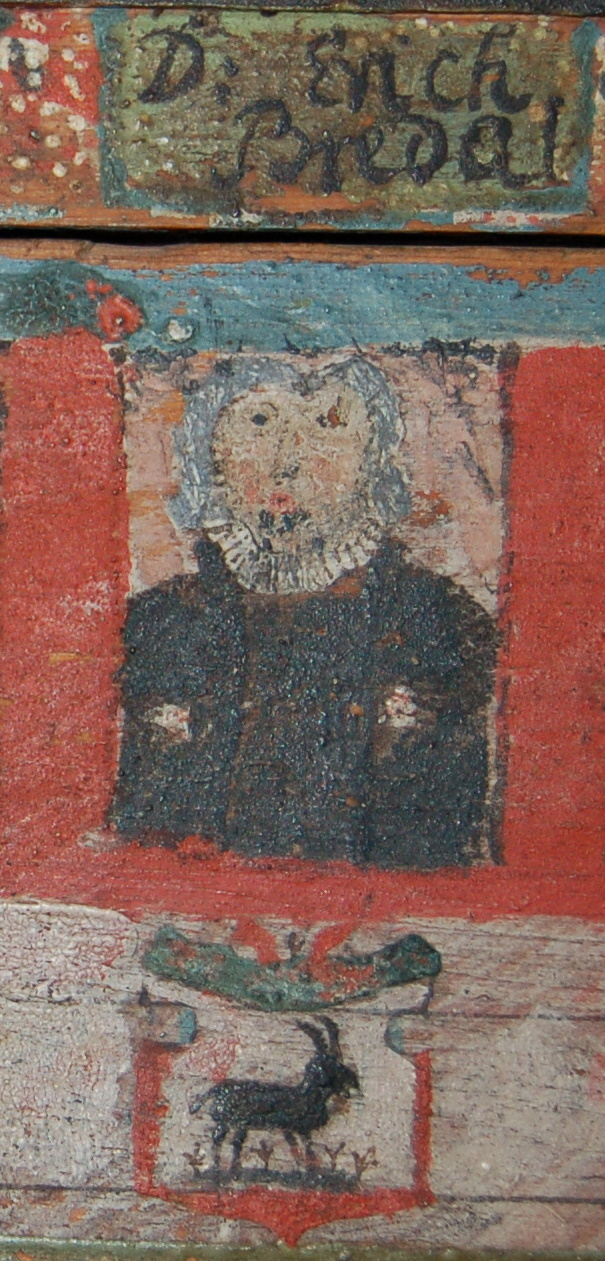
- Erik Bredal, painted by Sigvard Kildal
- Born: 1608; Rudkøbing, Denmark
- Died: 18 May 1672 (aged 63–64); Trondheim, Norway
- Occupation: Lutheran Bishop

Erik Bredal (1608 – 18 May 1672) was a Danish-born, Norwegian Lutheran Bishop.

Erik Bredal was born in the town of Rudkøbing, on the island of Langeland in south-central Denmark. Bredal came from a clerical family. His father was a parish priest in Rudkøbing and provost in Nørre Herred. His grandfather was vicar of Vinding Parish, in Tyrsting Herred. After schooling at Sorø Academy, he came to Nykøbing Falster, where he became rector of the Latin school in 1633. From 1637, he was a student at the University of Rostock, earning his Magister degree in 1639.

In 1640 he became pastor of Church of Our Saviour (Vor Frelsers Kirke) at Christianshavn on the island of Amager. The community and church were both in formation at that time. In 1643, he was appointed Bishop of the Diocese of Nidaros (Trondhjems Stift) which included Trøndelag. His zealous reform efforts led to clashes of interests with local priests on a series of issues, such as the appointment of resident curates, the status of priests' widows, and duties and quality of education.

Trøndelag was ceded in 1658 to Sweden under the terms of the Treaty of Roskilde and was ruled by Sweden. Clergy could retain their positions if they swore allegiance to the Swedish king. Bishop Bredal refused to submit to the enemy, and temporally relocated north to Trondenes, in Troms, with his family. The Treaty of Copenhagen in 1660 restored Trøndelag to Norwegian control and placed Erik Bredal back as Bishop of Trøndelag, where he served until his death in 1672.

Church of Norway titles
Preceded by Peder Skjelderup	Bishop of Trondhjem; 1643–1672	Succeeded by Arnold de Fine
