= Synnøve Johansdatter =

Norwegian woman tried for alleged sorcery (died 1678)

- Born: c. 1648; Trondenes, Harstad, Norway
- Died: Summer 1678; Vadsø, Norway
- Occupations: Maid, healer
- Known for: Accused as a witch
- Spouse: Albert Halvorsen
- Children: 2

Synnøve Johansdatter (c. 1648 – Summer 1678) was a Norwegian healer who was accused and convicted of witchcraft. She was the last person to be executed during the witchcraft trials in Finnmark and one of the last to be executed in Norway.

== Background ==
Synnøve Johansdatter was born in about 1648 in Trondenes. During the 1660s, she moved to Vadsø to work as a maid, as well as working as a healer to the locals, and soon became renowned for her skills. She often advised the villagers on how to treat illness and pain, although the locals had a conflicted relationship with her due to her temper, which led to frequent arguments and cursing at people. She was married to the Bergen fisherman Albert Halvorsen. Together they had two children, Halvor and Anne.

== Trial and execution ==
Johansdatter worked as a maid for the upper class in Vadsø. They accused her of killing their most prized cows and initiated court proceedings against her. During her trial, they presented what appeared to be a ball of black wool that was found in the flesh of one of the cows as evidence of her involvement. When questioned at the court hearing in June 1678, she voluntarily confessed that as a young child working on Sama farm in Harstad, she was taught magic by a fellow farm worker named Anne, who showed her how to kill livestock by placing eggshells in water that had been gathered in the name of Satan. During this training, Johansdatter claimed she had a vision of a beautifully dressed man standing in front of her, with claws on his hands and feet, who soon after disappeared. Eight years after first learning witchcraft, she claimed to have killed a small, half-grown goat on the Lysbotn farm north of Senja because she was angry with a man named Hans Olsen.

On 6 June 1678, Johansdatter was found guilty of violating God's law and the King's commands, and she was sentenced to death. It was emphasized in court that Johansdatter confessed voluntarily, without any form of coercion. After receiving her sentence, she named a Vadsø woman, Kirsten Knudsdatter, as a fellow witch and claimed that Knudsdatter was more skilled and "worse" at witchcraft than she was. However, Knudsdatter was later acquitted of all charges in 1680. When asked by the case's bailiff, Lauritz Faag, whether he would appeal against his wife's verdict, Albert Halvorsen declined and said he believed the charges were correct. Johansdatter was executed by burning that same summer.
