= Finn-Kirsten =

Woman executed for witchcraft

Kirsten Iversdatter, known as Finn-Kirsten (died 14 October 1674), was a Norwegian Southern Sami woman, who was executed for witchcraft in Norway. She was one of only 26 Sami people executed for witchcraft in Norway in the 17th century.

She was active as a wandering beggar in the countryside of Trøndelag. She was arrested in February 1674 and charged with witchcraft in Støren. She was accused of having the ability to cause harm by use of sorcery, and to threaten those who refuse to give her alms by doing so. This was a common accusation when beggars was accused of sorcery. In her case, her Sami origin made her suspicious, since there was a fear among the Christian Norwegians for the "pagan Sami magic", since the Sami was still at this point often pagans. She denied the charges, but was sentenced to death on charge of extramarital sex, since she was unmarried but still accompanied by two daughters. She confessed that she was indeed a witch, and had attended the Witches' Sabbath. She was transferred to Trondheim, where she was prosecuted. She pointed out thirty accomplices. The trial attracted great attention, but the accomplices were eventually acquitted.

Finn-Kirsten was executed by burning at the stake. She was the last person to be executed for witchcraft in Trøndelag.

== See also ==
- Witch trials in Norway
