= Jämtland campaign (1677) =

Norwegian military campaign

The Jämtland campaign of 1677 was a military campaign that led to a temporary Norwegian reconquest of the province of Jämtland (Norwegian: Jemtland) in the summer of 1677 during the Scanian War. The conquest was short-lived; Sweden was able to regain control of the province in November the same year.

== Strategic aims ==
Jämtland had been ceded to Sweden by Denmark-Norway at the Treaty of Brömsebro in 1645, and was, therefore, a target for reconquest. From the onset of the war, the Swedish strategic plan had included an attack into Norway from Jämtland. However, the crises on the other fronts had repeatedly drawn away from the troops that would have participated in such an attack.

== Development ==
In the beginning of 1677 news arrived that the Norwegians defending Trondheim had moved south to reinforce the army of Ulrik Frederick Gyldenløve. This presented an opportunity for advancing across the Norwegian border. The attacking force was to be led by Carl Larsson Sparre, the governor-general of Västernorrland county. He had at his disposal a force of 1,700 men, of which three companies were local men from Jämtland. However, he was unable to feed these troops, and furthermore, the troops, who hadn't received payment in ten months, had dispersed across Norrland to live meagerly off the land, which had been ravaged by famine for several years. Thus, the planned attack had to be abandoned.

That summer Swedish reconnaissance indicated that the Norwegians were themselves gathering forces in Trondheim and Røros and preparing for an attack across the border. Sparre received a dispatch from Magnus Gabriel De la Gardie encouraging him to prevent this attack by moving his men either towards Trondheim or alternatively to Røros and on through the valley of Gudbrandsdal to Värmland. Sparre chose the latter alternative, detaching major Carl Rutencrantz with a force to Oviken, but delaying his own departure to await a promised complement of 1,400 men from Österbotten. Sparre also attempted to muster troops and supplies from Jämtland itself, but like in Skåne and Bohuslän the people were still loyal to their former masters. The Swedes were barely tolerated, and promised supplies and horses never appeared. When the troops from Österbotten finally arrived, they numbered only 290, and were poorly armed and trained. Short of ammunition and unable to feed his troops, Sparre was again forced to scatter his troops to live off the land.

News now arrived of the Norwegians crossing the border. Sparre was now in an even more precarious position: his defensive positions were in disrepair and he had no means to strengthen them. There were only fourteen cannon at his disposal.

On August 16, a large Norwegian force attacked Rutencrantz' positions at Oviken. The engagement had barely begun when the Jämtlandians abandoned their positions and defected to the Norwegians. The remaining Swedish dragoons held their positions and continued fighting into the night until they were overrun.

Before news of this action had reached Sparre, he had decided to move his remaining troops north to Brunflo in order block the Norwegians' access to Storsjön. While the infantry marched overland, the artillery was to be transported by boat. At his arrival, Sparre found only 400 men and the artillery lost, and retired to Gullesundsbro. There he learned that Rutencrantz' detachment in Oviken had been defeated. This prompted him to rush to Borgsjö to regroup. His army had been reinforced to 1,700 men but he dared not attempt to stop the Norwegian force, as he had convinced himself he was surrounded by larger enemy numbers.

The Norwegians had captured about 400 men and four cannon. A medal was struck to commemorate the victories and celebrate the reconquest of the former Norwegian province. On the Swedish side, blame of the failure was directed at Sparre, who in turn blamed his scant supplies and paucity of men. Charles XI was a stern master and relieved him, naming Jacob Fleming governor-general of Jämtland in his stead. Field marshal Henrik Horn was ordered to lead the troops in the general area of Stockholm to defend Norrland. Horn assembled his men in Medelpad in the fall of 1677 and had hardly begun his march into the Jämtland when news reached him that the Norwegians had already left. Reconnoitering Swedish cavalry had given them the impression that a larger force was arriving, so they left Jämtland November 1 after burning their stores. This was a stroke of luck for the Swedes, as Norrland was still suffering from the famine, and it would have been near impossible to find supplies for his men.

As he was entering Jämtland, Horn received a letter from the king, where he was ordered to investigate the reports of treachery from the local people. In December the clergy and local representatives were summoned for questioning. Horn learned that a secret alliance had been made between the people of Jämtland and the Norwegians, ratified with the local communities' seals. Severe reprisals were feared, but in the end the people of Jämtland were ordered to hand over their weapon in order to prevent "future secret aid to the enemy". This relatively mild punishment was in stark contrast to the harsh treatment of the Scanian lands.

== Sources ==
- Björlin, Gustaf (1885) Kriget mot Danmark 1675 - 1679 ISBN 978-1-142-27749-9
- Vaupell, Otto Frederik (1872) Den danske hærs historie til nutiden og den norske hærs historie, indtil 1814 (University of Michigan Library. 1872)
- Sehlin, Carl (1929 Grunddragen av Jämtlands och Härjedalens historia (Östersund, Jämtlands Läns Bildningsförbunds förlag)
- Gjerset, Knut (1915) History of the Norwegian People (The MacMillan Company)
- Lisk, Jill (1967) The Struggle for Supremacy in the Baltic: 1600-1725 (Funk & Wagnalls, New York)
