= Magnus Berg =

Norwegian painter and sculptor (1666–1739)

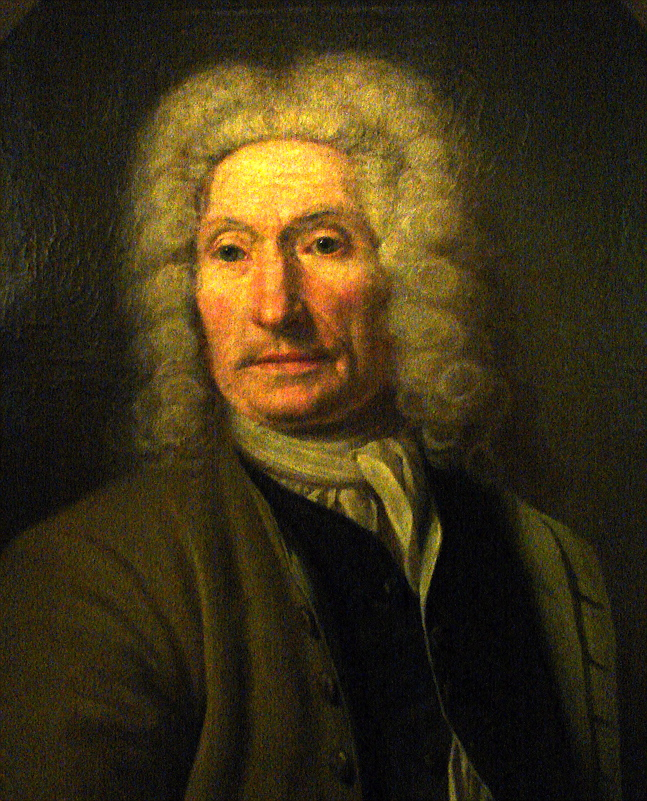
- Portrait of Magnus Berg (unknown artist)
- Born: 28 November 1666; Gudbrandsdalen, Norway
- Died: 31 March 1739 (aged 72); Copenhagen, Denmark
- Known for: Ivory sculptures
- Notable work: Vannets element

Magnus Berg (28 November 1666 – 31 March 1739) was a Norwegian-born wood carver, painter, sculptor and non-fiction writer who settled in Denmark.

== Early life and education ==
Berg was born in Gudbrandsdal where his father worked for the Selsverket Kobberverk in what is now Sel Municipality in Innlandet county, Norway. Ulrik Frederik Gyldenløve who was viceroy to (Statholder) of Norway discovered his skill as a woodcarver. As a young man, Berg was brought to Copenhagen. From 1690 to 1694, the king apprenticed him to the court painter Peder Andersen Normand at Frederiksborg Castle. As an artist paid by the king, he had to make a four-year study trip to Italy and Paris. In 1703 he was appointed art teacher for the Danish Royal family in Copenhagen.

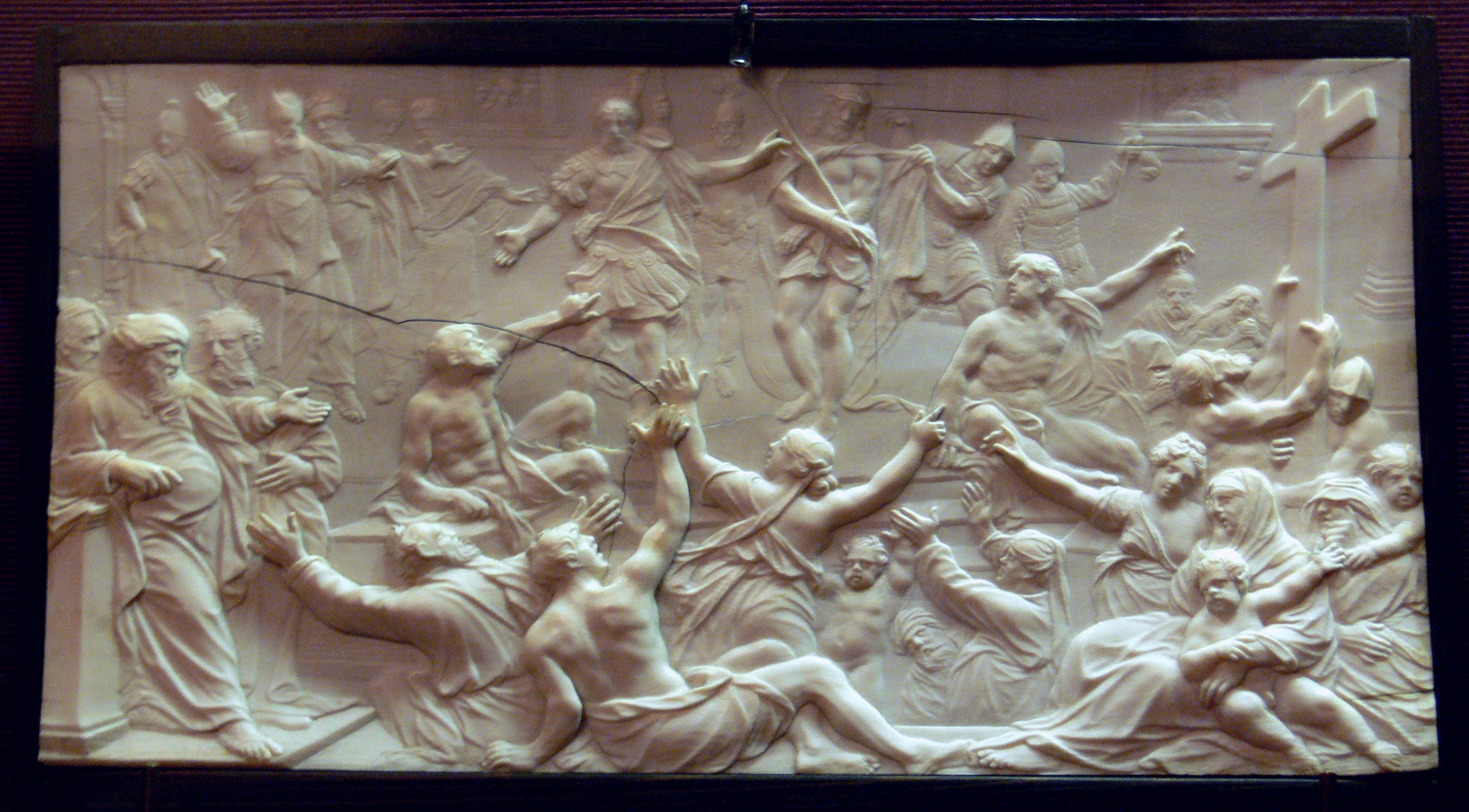
Ecce Homo. Ivory relief by Magnus Berg, possibly from 1721

Berg was most noted for carving miniature reliefs in ivory. Most were acquired by the Danish royal family. Among his 42 works located at the Rosenborg Castle in Copenhagen is the vase Vannets element. He is also represented at the National Gallery of Norway and in museums in Hamburg, Vienna and Stockholm. A biography of Berg was published in Copenhagen in 1745.
