= Niels Hanssøn Meng =

Norwegian politician

- Born: 1604; Fredrikstad, Norway
- Died: 1676 (aged 71–72)
- Occupation: Timber trader

Niels Hanssøn Meng (1604 – August 1676) was a Norwegian timber trader, property owner and civil leader.

Meng was born at Fredrikstad in Østfold, Norway. He was a leading timber merchant of the town, came to great wealth, and was the owner of dozens of farms. Around 1640, he settled in Halden and increased his holdings in Båhuslen and Follo.

About 1630, he came into public service, first in Nordre Viken, and from 1644 to 1655 as bailiff there and in Idd and Marker. In addition, he was royal customs officer at Halden and Svinesund. He was also judge and acting district governor of Smaalenenes (now Østfold). Meng was the first Mayor of Fredrikshald, after it was given town privileges from 1665.

Through his marriage to Johanne Christensdatter (b. ca. 1615), he received significant properties in Båhuslen. He was the father of four daughters and included among his sons-in law, Peder Olsen Normand (d. 1676) who was a merchant at Halden and owner of Holene in Idd.
