= Jacob Maschius =

Norwegian clergyman, poet and engraver (1630-1678)

Jacob Mortenssøn Maschius (c.1630 – 12 August 1678) was a Norwegian clergyman, poet and copperplate engraver. He is most remembered for the poetry book, Norwegia religiosa (1661).

== Life ==
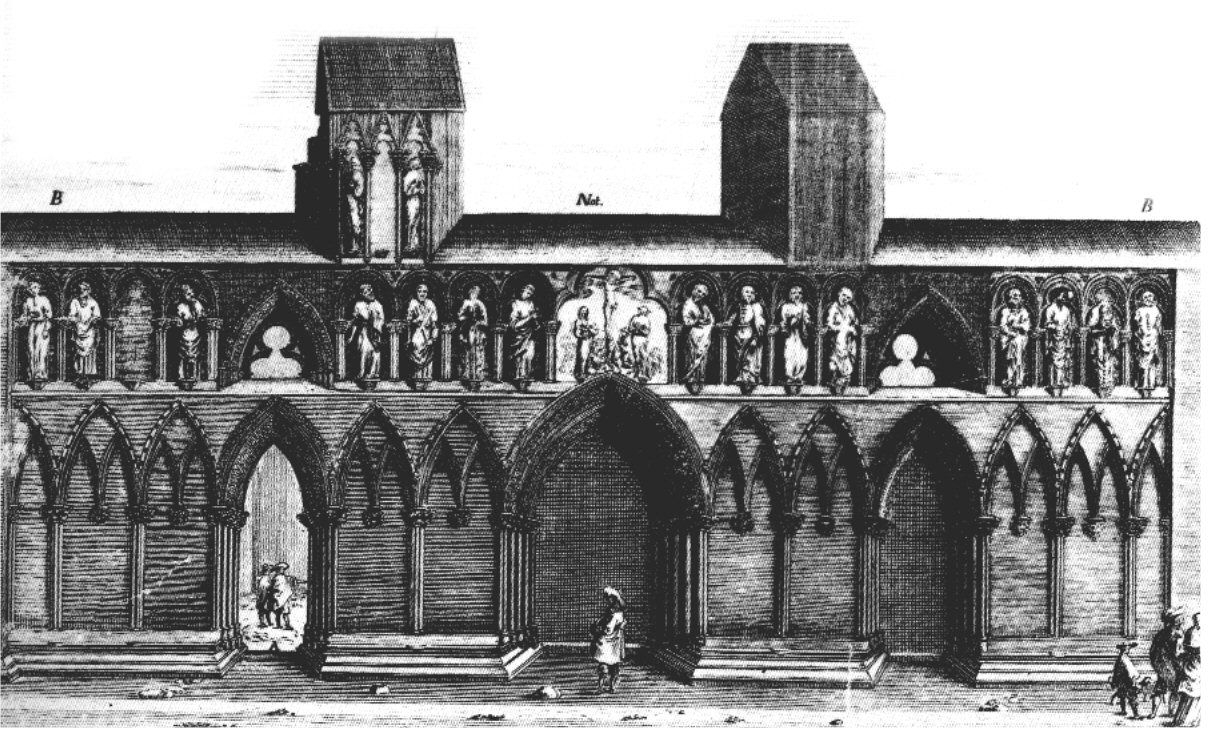
West front of Nidaros Cathedral, Trondheim, 1661

Maschius attended Bergen Cathedral School in 1651. He subsequently traveled to Copenhagen and studied there for some years, returning to Norway in 1659. He received a commission to serve as a draftsman during the construction of a fortification on Munkholmen, an islet located north of Trondheim. Construction of the fortress began in 1658 and was completed in 1661. From 1668 to 1669, he worked for Johan Frederik von Marschalck, commander of Bergenhus Fortress located in the entrance to the harbor in Bergen.

After a visit to the Nidaros Cathedral in Trondheim approximately 1660, he wrote a poetry book entitled Norwegia religiosa. It contained illustrations of the cathedral, one set from the north, the second of the western front. These later formed the basis for discussions regarding subsequent restoration of the cathedral which was initiated in 1869.

In 1676, he was appointed priest in the parish of Jølster in Nordre Bergenhus county. He became engaged in May 1678 with Maren Finde, who was his predecessor's widow. They were married in June 1678. He continued to serve as parish priest until his death on 12 August 1678.

== Other sources ==
- Bakken, Arne (1997) Nidarosdomen – en Pilegrimsvandring (Oslo:Aschehoug) ISBN 82-03-22186-6
- Danbolt, Gunnar (1997) Nidarosdomen, fra Kristkirke til nasjonalmonument (Oslo: Andresen og Butenschøn) ISBN 82-7694-024-2
- Ekroll, Øystein (2006) Nidarosdomen - Vestfrontens skulpturer (Trondheim: Nidaros Domkirkes Restaureringsarbeiders forlag) ISBN 82-7693-061-1
