= Mathia Collett =

Norwegian merchant and businessperson

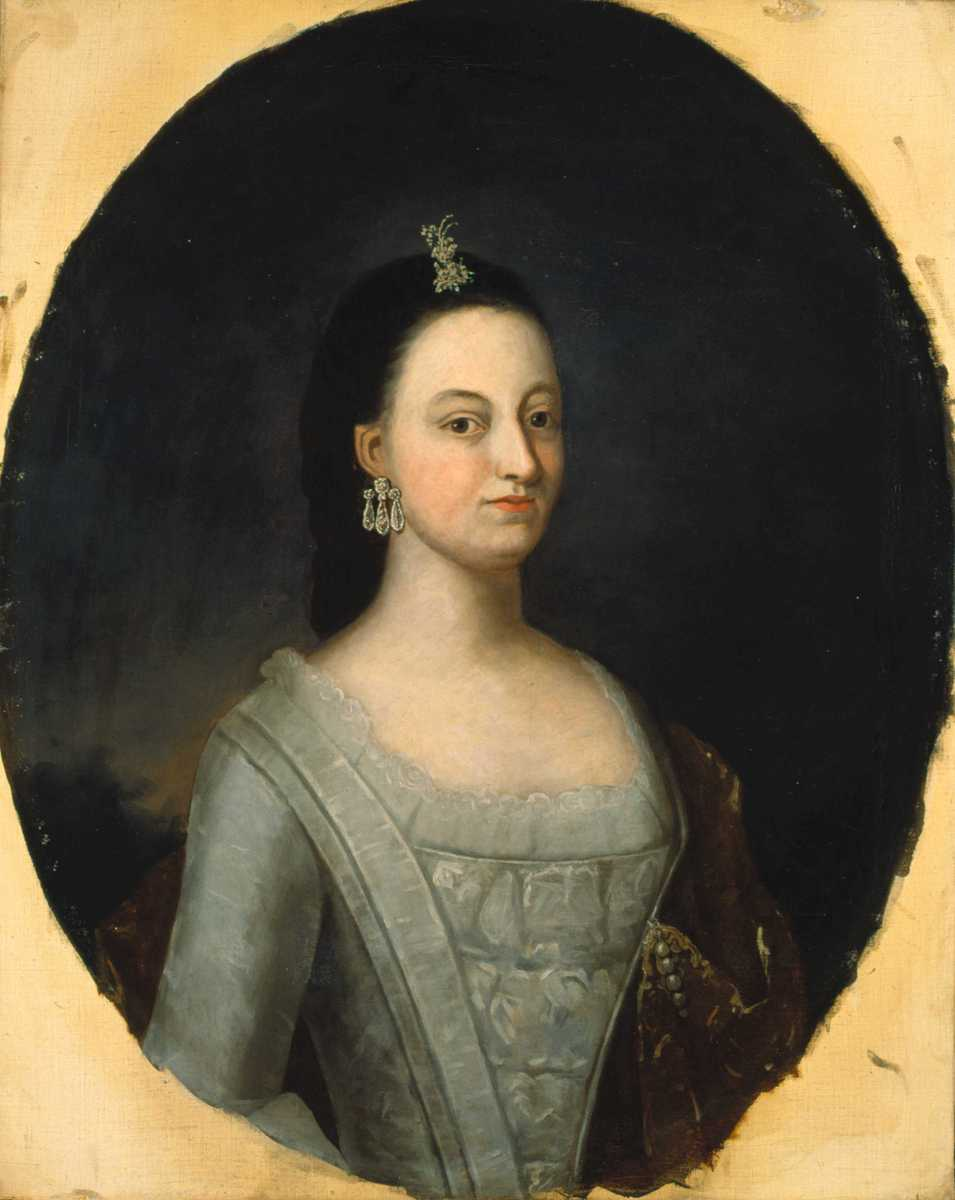
- Born: 28 May 1737; Christiania, Denmark-Norway
- Died: 21 July 1801 (aged 64)
- Other names: Mathia Leuch, Mathia Anker
- Occupations: businessperson; amateur theatre directress
- Known for: Being married to Norway's then wealthiest person, Bernt Anker
- Spouses: Morten Leuch (m. 1758; died 1768) Bernt Anker (m. 1773)
- Relatives: Ditlevine Feddersen (sister); James Collett (grandfather)
- Family: Collett

Mathia Collett (Norwegian pronunciation: [mɑˈtîːɑ ˈkɔ̀ɫːət]; 28 May 1737 – 21 July 1801) was a Norwegian merchant and businessperson. After her first husband's death, she was the co-owner of the trading company Collett & Leuch, an influential trading company, with her brother. From 1773 to her death in 1801, she was married to the then wealthiest person in Norway, Bernt Anker. She was the younger sister of the poet Ditlevine Feddersen.

== Early life ==
Collett was born on 28 May 1737 in Christiania as the tenth of eleven children to Peter Collett and Anna Cathrine Collett (née Rosenberg). As a member of the Collett family, she was born into the social elite of Christiania. Given that she was a woman in 18th-century Norway, her options of education were limited; women were not allowed to attend universities until 1882. However, due to her social status she did receive home schooling, unlike women of lower social strata.

Collett became an orphan at an early age; her father died when she was three years old, and her mother five years later. She inherited 12,500 riksdaler (approximately US$750,000 in 2019) after the death of her parents. She and her sister Ditlevine moved in with their widowed aunt Maria three years later. They stayed with their aunt until their marriages.

== First marriage ==
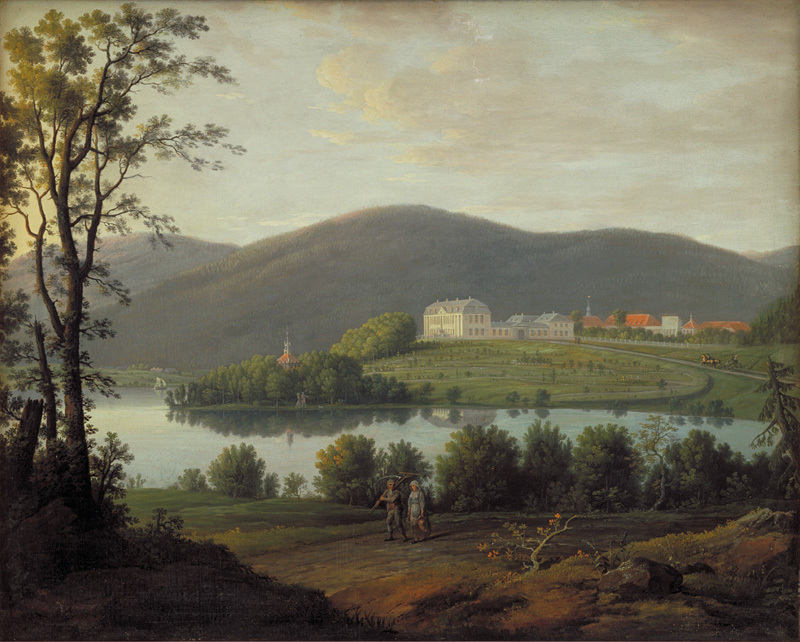
The Bogstad estate in which Collett lived with her first husband, Morten Leuch

On 6 May 1758, Collett married her relative Morten Leuch, co-owner of the Collett & Leuch company, the then biggest trading company in Christiania, with her brother James Collett. Leuch was at the centre of the merchant aristocracy of Christiania, and owner of the Bogstad manor, which he had inherited from his mother. In 1761, the couple adopted the twelve-year-old daughter of Isaac Cold, Anna Elisabeth Cold, after his death. This would be the only child Leuch would raise with her.

After Leuch's death in 1768, Collett became the sole owner of their estate as Cold could not inherit it. Collett also became the co-owner of Collett & Leuch until her second marriage in 1773. Collett continued living with their daughter until she sold the estate to her in 1772, the same year Cold married Peder Anker.

== Second marriage ==
The year after Collett sold their estate, she married Anker's brother, Bernt Anker, who was nine years her junior. The marriage was largely based in their economy; Anker stated that it was "an episode where his soul had no part". Romance was not present in their relationship, nevertheless, they were content. The couple traveled abroad often, as they were fond of European culture. This extended to their interest in theatre, as they started their own amateur theatre group, "The dramatic party" (Det dramatiske Selskab), of which Mathia was the "directrix" (directrise). Mathia would again take in a foster daughter, Martine Elieson, whom she would raise with her husband. Elieson would later marry Mathia's nephew, John Collett. Toward the end of the century, Anker had become the wealthiest individual in Norway.

=== The Ankerian orphanage ===
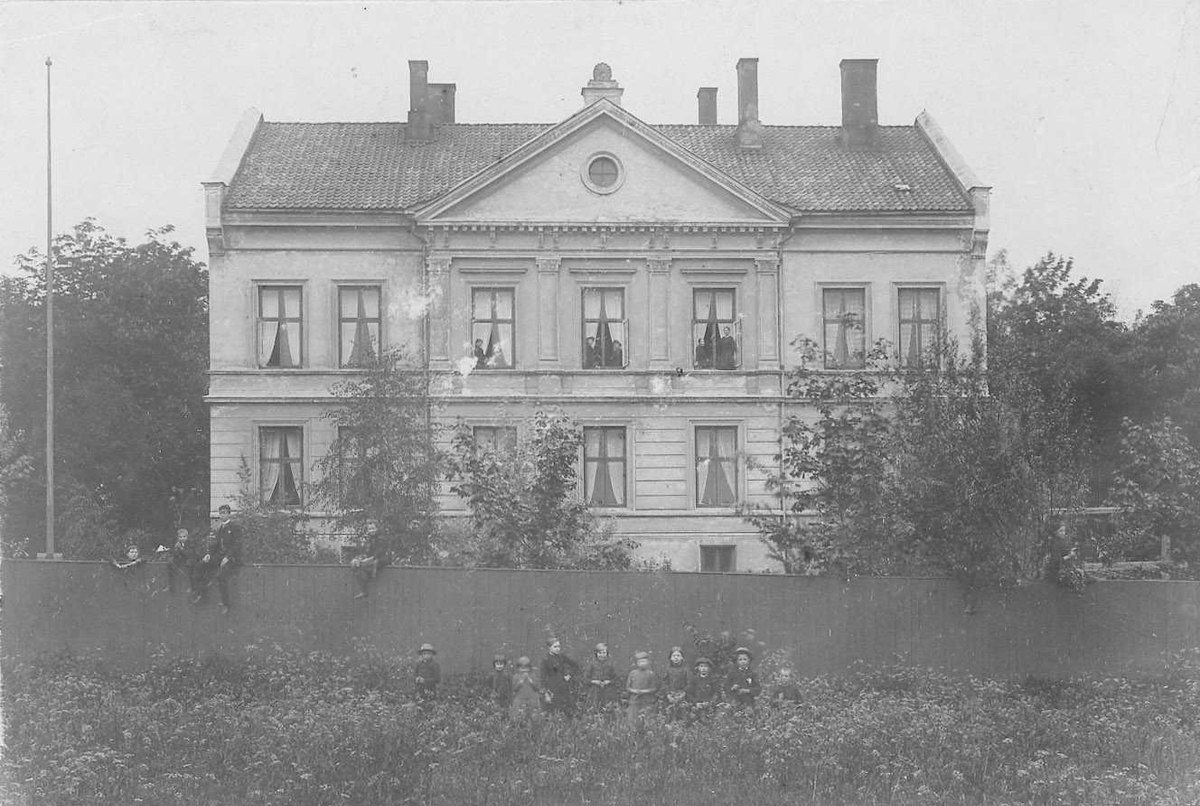
The Ankerian Orphanage

On their anniversary in 1778, the couple founded "the Ankerian orphanage" (Det Ankerske Waisenhus). Orphans, preferably those of higher status families, would be given free housing, meals, and education until their sixteenth birthday. The education consisted of literacy, calculus, geography, history, morals, and religion, and would mostly be taught by students. Due to Mathia's adolescence as an orphan, she would often teach classes herself, and would treat the "foreign and poor children as her own". After their graduation, they would be given clothes and finances. Boys would be given the opportunity to pursue a craft or travel overseas, while girls would be sent to work as maids, or be given comparable work. The orphanage was funded by the couple's immense wealth.

== Death ==
Mathia Collett died on 21 July 1801 at the age of 63 due to unknown causes. Her funeral three days later was described as "one that has never been seen before", as the whole of Christiania was "in motion". Close family and friends weren't the only ones to attend the procession, as the children of the orphanage attended it along with their teacher, who walked in front of the coffin.

Anker died four years later in 1805 at the age of 58.

A monument was established in her memory in 1803 by Anker in Paléhaven, a public garden close to an estate of his, Paléet, which would later become the residence of the royal family. The monument was later moved to Frogner Park to be closer to Collett and Anker's residence, the Frogner manor.
