= Morten Leuch =

Norwegian merchant

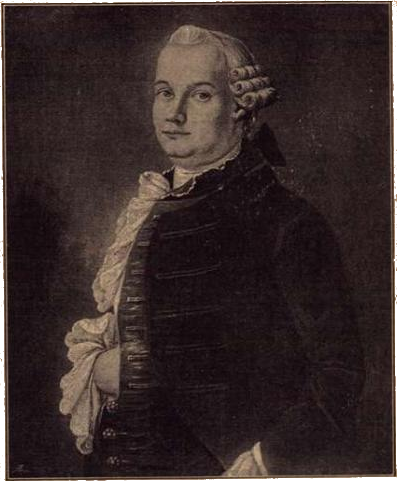
Morten Leuch

Morten Leuch (15 April 1732 – 24 January 1768) was a Norwegian timber trader and landowner. He was the owner of Bogstad Manor at Sørkedalen .

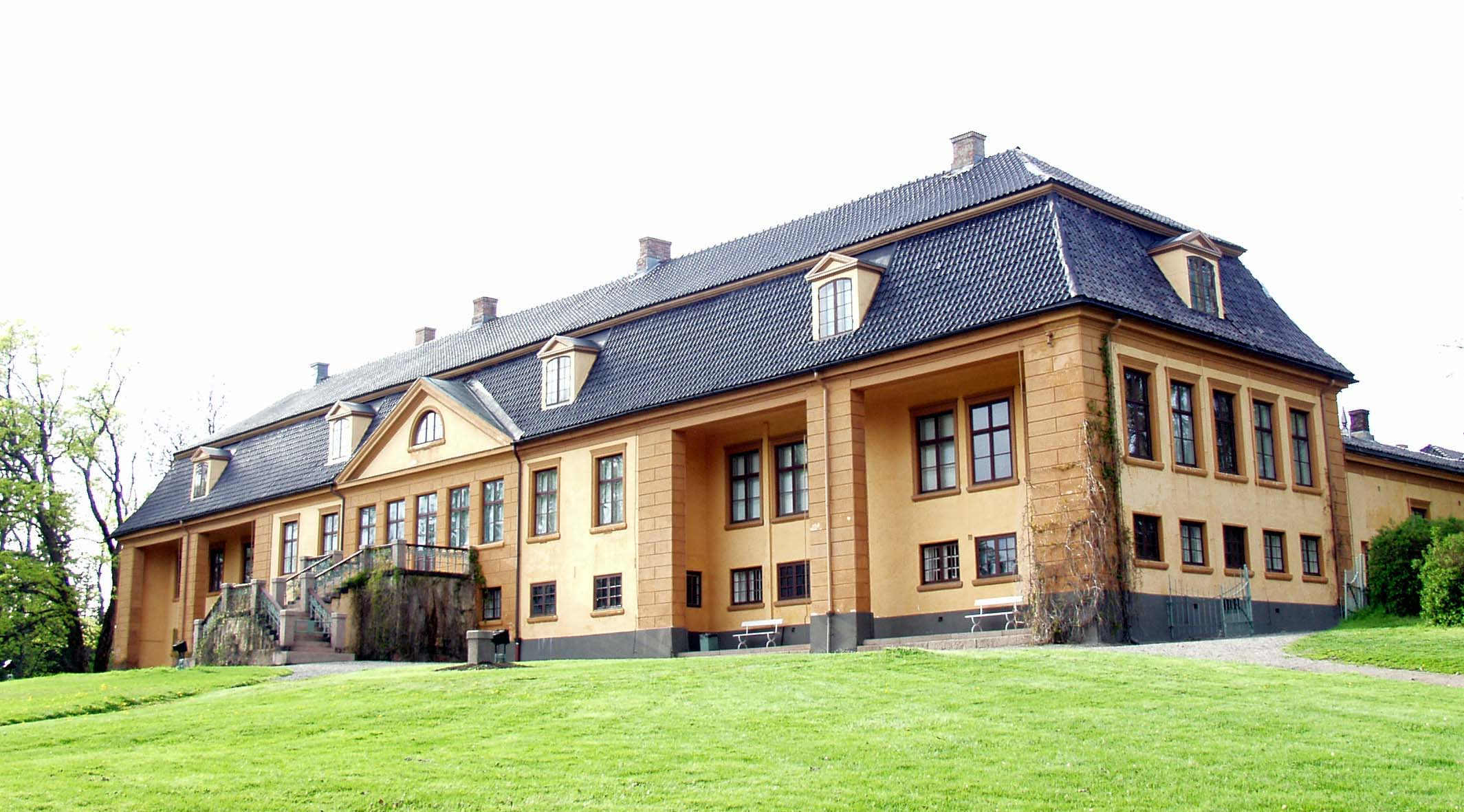
Bogstad Manor

== Biography ==
Morten Leuch was born in Christiania (now Oslo), Norway. He was the son of merchant Peter Mortensen Leuch (1692–1746) and Anna Catharina Hellesen. His father had founded the company Collett & Leuch together with Peter Collett (1694–1740). After several years of education abroad, Morten Leuch returned to Norway in 1754 and joined the company Collett & Leuch with his future brother-in-law James Collett (1728–1794).

Leuch was the owner of Bogstad (Bogstadgodset), which he inherited in 1756 after his grandmother's death. He was married in 1758 to Mathia Collett, (1737-1801) the sister of his partner. Christian Braunmann Tullin wrote the poem "Maidagen" to their wedding. Leuch died at the age of 36 in 1769. After his death, his widow married landowner Bernt Anker (1746-1805).
