= 1820 Norwegian parliamentary election =

← 1817	May 1820–14 February 1821	1823 →

All 77 seats in the Storting 39 seats needed for a majority
- Registered: 62,026
Prime Minister before election
Peder Anker
Prime Minister after election
Peder Anker

Parliamentary elections were held in Norway in 1820. As political parties were not officially established until 1884, all those elected were independents.

== Results ==
Of the 77 seats, 27 were won by civil servants, 26 by farmers, sheriffs, church singers and teachers and 24 by people with other professions.

Party	Votes	%	Seats
Independents			77
Total			77
Registered voters/turnout	62,026	–	
Source: Nohlen & Stöver, NSSDS
