= Christian Ancher =

Norwegian merchant, timber trader and ship owner

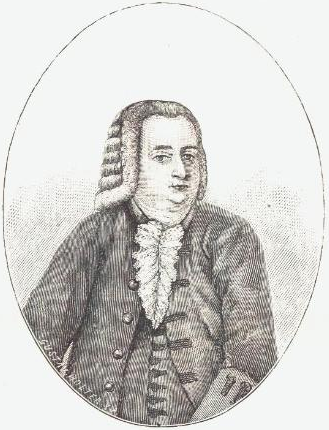
- Born: 27 July 1711; Søndre Land, Denmark-Norway
- Died: 9 January 1765 (aged 53); Christiania, Denmark-Norway
- Occupations: merchant, timber trader, and ship owner

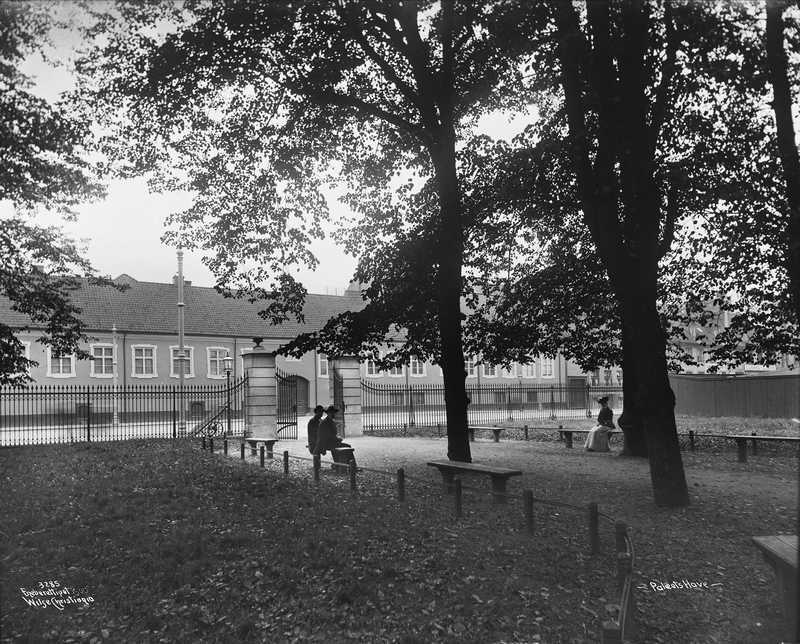
Paléet Manor in Christiania

Christian Ancher (27 July 1711 – 9 January 1765) was a Norwegian merchant, timber trader and ship owner.

== Biography ==
Ancher was born in the southern part of Land in Christians amt, Denmark-Norway (present-day Søndre Land Municipality in Innlandet county). He was the son of Bernt Ancher (1680–1724) and Karen Tanche (1685–1758). The son of a vicar in the Church of Norway, he trained in the trading house established by cousins James Collett (1655–1727) and Peder Leuch (1692–1746) in Christiania (now Oslo).

He eventually became the largest timber trader in Christiania. He was also quite active in shipping. He is commonly associated with his residence, Paléet Manor near Bjørvika, which later was used as a Royal residence.

== Personal life ==
He was married to Karen Elieson (1723–1806). They were the parents of four sons: Bernt Anker who was a merchant and owner of Frogner Manor, Peder Anker who became Prime Minister of Norway and was owner of Bogstad Manor, as well as Iver (1745–1772) and Jess (1753–1798).
