= Johannes P. Bøe =

Norwegian politician

Johannes Paulsen Bøe (4 November 1774 – 7 November 1859) was a Norwegian politician.

He was elected to the Parliament of Norway in 1815, representing the constituency of Christians Amt. He was a farmer. He sat through one term.
