= Gulbrand Eriksen Tandberg =

Norwegian farmer and politician

Gulbrand Eriksen Tandberg (11 November 1775 – 4 February 1848) was a Norwegian farmer and politician.

He was a son of Erich Olsen (1724–1801) and Marie Ellevsdatter Tandberg, who lived at the farm Østre Tanberg. Gulbrand received the farm name as his surname, and also the patronymic Eriksen. He was a great-grandfather of agricultural director Gudbrand Tandberg (1851–1929).

He was elected to the Parliament of Norway in 1815. He was later re-elected in 1824, representing the constituency of Buskeruds Amt. He was later a deputy representative during the term 1827–1829. In addition to farming he worked as a timber merchant.
