= 1817 Norwegian parliamentary election =

← 1815	August 1817–26 February 1818	1820 →

All 78 seats in the Storting 40 seats needed for a majority
- Registered: 60,488
Prime Minister before election
Peder Anker
Prime Minister after election
Peder Anker

Parliamentary elections were held in Norway in 1817. As political parties were not officially established until 1884, all those elected were independents.

== Results ==
Of the 78 seats, 42 were won by civil servants, 18 by farmers, sheriffs, church singers and teachers and 18 by people with other professions. Seven elected members were affiliated with the Haugean movement.

Party	Votes	%	Seats
Independents			78
Total			78
Registered voters/turnout	60,488	–	
Source: Nohlen & Stöver, NSSDS
