= Eidsvoll 1814 =

Museum in Norway

Coordinates: 60°18′04″N 11°10′18″E

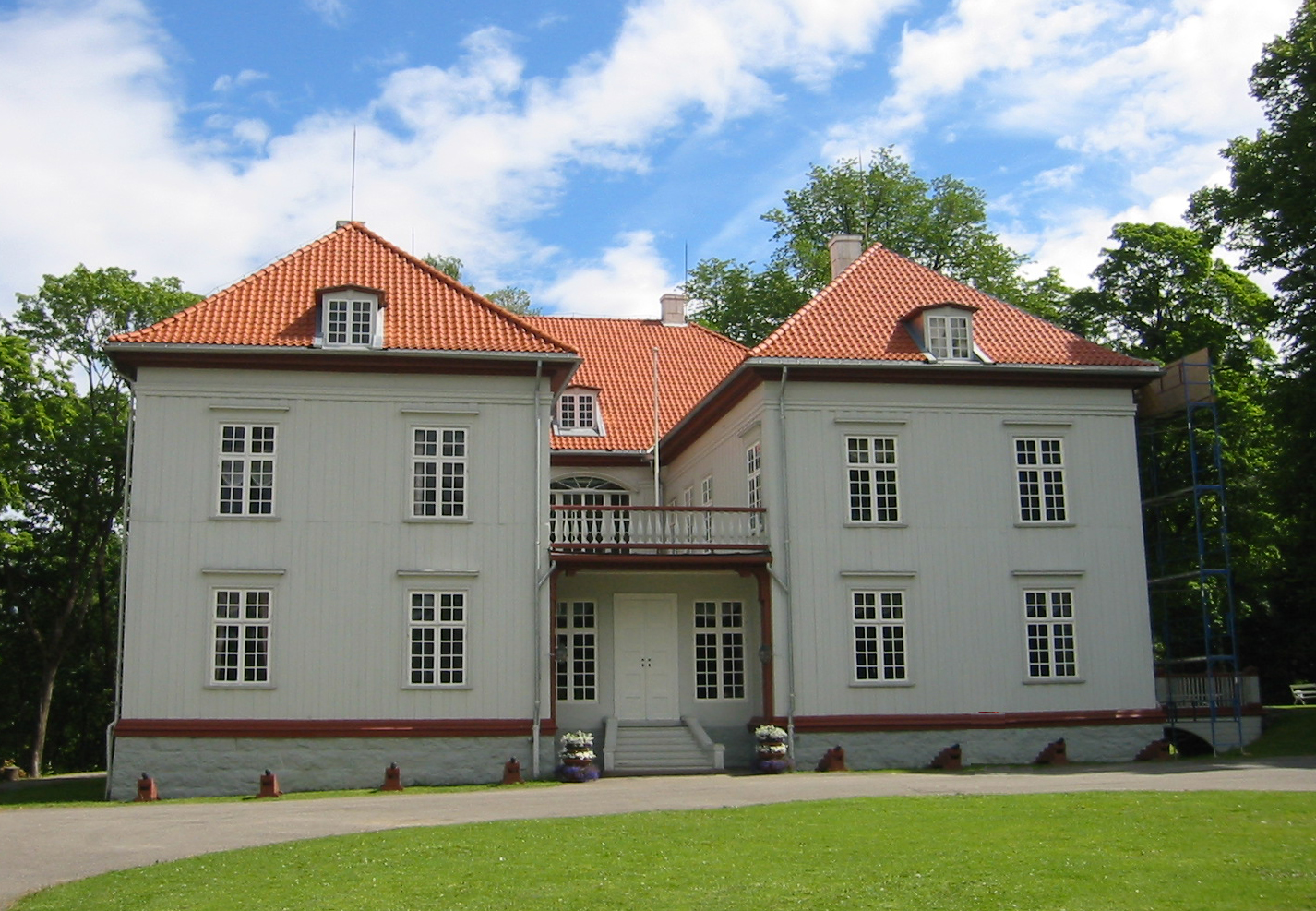
Eidsvoll Manor House, which the foundation manages

Eidsvoll 1814 is the Norwegian Constitution museum with Eidsvoll Manor House, where the Norwegian constitution was drafted and debated in 1814. The building is one of the best-known and most historically important buildings in Norway as the arena for the constitutional process in 1814. The finished constitution was dated and signed on May 17, which also became the Norwegian national day. The museum also consists of the Wergeland House visitor center, with an auditorium, exhibition area, café, and shop, as well as an administrative office. The visitor center is named after the Norwegian poet Henrik Wergeland, who grew up in Eidsvoll in the early 19th century, and who played an important role in the establishment of the museum.

Eidsvoll 1814 was set up as an independent foundation by the Storting in 1998, but on January 1, 2010 it was merged with the Norwegian Museum of Cultural History as a result of the national museum reform. One of the reasons for the merger was that both the Norwegian Museum of Cultural History and Eidsvoll 1814 had significant shared interests in the 2014 Norwegian Constitution Bicentennial. Following the merger, Eidsvoll 1814 is a now division of the Norwegian Museum of Cultural History, but Eidsvoll 1814 is still presented with a separate profile.

Eidsvoll 1814 has a national mandate to preserve and convey the history of the creation of the Constitution of Norway in 1814. The museum has approximately 80,000 visitors in total per year.

== History ==
Eidsvoll 1814 was established as a foundation for managing the Eidsvoll Manor House for the Norwegian state. The foundation then replaced the former Eidsvoll Memorial (Norwegian: Eidsvollminnet), which was created in 1837 when the Eidsvoll Manor House was purchased for preservation as a national monument. The manor had been purchased by private individuals with collected funds, and it was given as a gift to the Norwegian state in 1851. Erik Jondell served as the director of the foundation from 2001 to July 1, 2016. On September 1, 2016 he was succeeded by historian Bård Frydenlund as CEO.
