= 1815 Norwegian parliamentary election =

← 1814	December 1814–June 1815	1817 →

All 87 seats in the Storting 44 seats needed for a majority
- Registered: 59,282
Prime Minister before election
Peder Anker
Prime Minister after election
Peder Anker

Parliamentary elections were held in Norway in 1815. As political parties were not officially established until 1884, all those elected were independents.

== Results ==
Of the 85 seats, 39 were won by civil servants, 32 by farmers, sheriffs, church singers and teachers and 16 by people with other professions. Five elected members were affiliated with the Haugean movement.

Party	Votes	%	Seats
Independents			85
Total			85
Registered voters/turnout	59,282	–	
Source: Nohlen & Stöver, NSSDS
