= Yngvar Hauge =

Norwegian writer

Yngvar Hauge (6 April 1899 – 7 March 1977) was a Norwegian novelist and non-fiction writer.

Yngvar Hauge was born in Oslo, Norway. Hauge was a student at Christiania Blind Institute from 1908 to 1915 and attended a school for the blind in Trondheim from 1915 to 1918. He passed the matriculation examination in 1922, and then studied history and art history at the University of Oslo.

He debuted in 1925 with the novel Ulv av Lauvnes, a saga from the time of King Sverre of Norway. He principally wrote novels with biographical and documentary features. His trilogy set in the time of King Charles XIV John of Sweden was one of his major works. He wrote books on the estate and manor house at Bogstad and on the iron foundry at Ulefos Jernværk. He also worked as a journalist for the newspaper Morgenbladet. He was awarded the Mads Wiel Nygaards Endowment in 1964.

== Selected works ==
- Ulv av Launæs (1924)
- Herren til Hegra (1926)
- Skuvøyhøvdingen (1927)
- Evas ætling (1930)
- Fra herregården og fra bruket (1934)
- På ytterste post (1938)
- Slottet og byen. Da kongeboligen ble til (1947)
- For åpen scene. Struensee i hoffkretsen (1950)
- Under flyvende vimpel (1954)
- Ulefos jernværk 1657–1957 (1957)
- Teodora (1961)
- Morgenbladets historie 1819–1854 (1963)
- Arven fra Østråt (1964)
- Keiseren og Ingerina (1963)
- Athenes datter (1966)
- Kongelig villskudd (1968)
- Fru Julie. Skildringer fra et gammelt jernverk (1972)
- Den stengte porten (1973)
- Falskmyntneren (1975)
