= Ditlevine Feddersen =

Norwegian poet, translator and culture personality

Ditlevine Feddersen (née Collett; 19 July 1727 – 18 November 1803) was a Norwegian poet, translator and culture personality. She was the older sister of Mathia Collett.

== Biography ==
She was one of eleven children of the wealthy merchant Peter Collett (1694–1740) and Anna Cathrine Rosenberg (1699–1747). She was given her name after governor Ditlev Vibe, who was her godfather. When her parents died, she lived together with her younger sister, Mathia, and their aunt until her marriage.

In 1749, she married Nicolai Feddersen (1699–1769), who was magistrate president of Christiania (now Oslo). They belonged to the social elite of the Oslo aristocracy. She arranged amateur theater performances. She was a central figure of the culture development in Oslo in the mid-18th century. She translated foreign language plays, including Carlo Goldoni's Pamela (1765). She was the muse of the poet Christian Braunmann Tullin, and in turn wrote her own poems which were influenced by him.

She wrote poems during great events in the city society life, such as Til Digteren Tullin paa egne og flere Damers Vegne, da han havde skrevet sin Majdag (1758). Nicolai and Ditlevine had one daughter and four sons together. In 1769, her spouse died and she left Norway for Copenhagen, Denmark.
