= Paléet =

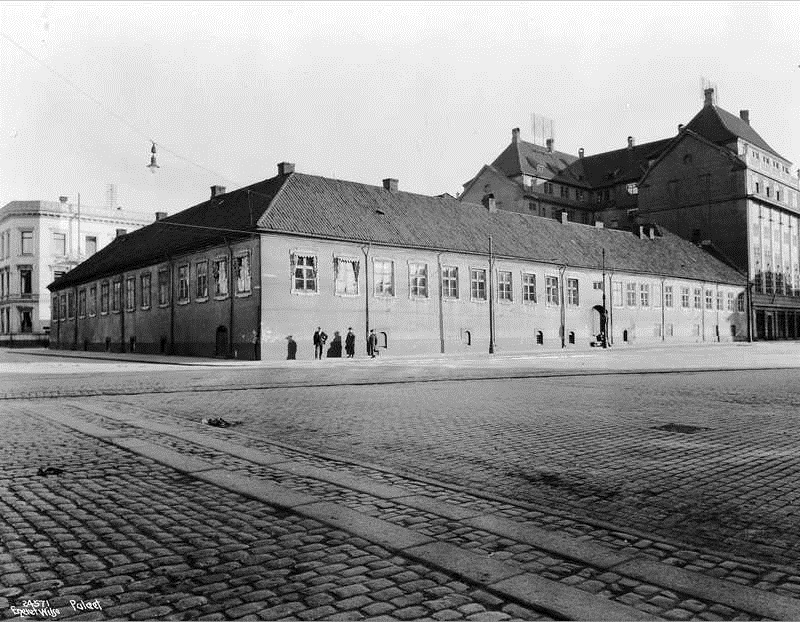
- Paléet around the year 1900

- Location within Oslo Paléet (Norway)

General information
- Architectural style: Baroque
- Location: Oslo, Norway
- Coordinates: 59.9145°N 10.7354°E
- Construction started: 1744
- Completed: 1745
- Client: Christian Ancher

Paléet was a monumental single storey townhouse located in the Norwegian capital Oslo that for a long time functioned as a residence for the Norwegian royalty.

== History ==
=== Construction ===
The building was constructed between the years 1744-45 and was commissioned by the wealthy merchant Christian Ancher. Situated in what is present-day Fred.Olsens gate 6, close to Oslo Central Station, the building was near a public garden, Paléhaven, that stretched down to the shores of Bjørvika.

=== Royal residence ===
The townhouse remained in the Anker family until the death of Bernt Anker who in 1805 bequeathed Paléet to the Norwegian government and the Norwegian royal family. King Charles XIV John expanded townhouse greatly, with the old stables being converted into residential areas, all decorated in Empire style. Paléet was subsequently given the role as the royal residence in Christiania during the era of the Union between Sweden and Norway, a role the townhouse maintained until the completion of the Royal Palace in 1848.

=== Later years ===
Paléet would later function as offices, living quarters for members of the Norwegian civil service, housed the Norwegian Supreme Court between 1898 and 1903 and was used by the Hird during the Second World War. The townhouse was demolished after a damaging fire in 1942 and no trace of the building can be seen today.

== Kings and royalty who resided at Paléet ==
- Christian VII of Denmark
- Charles August, Crown Prince of Sweden
- Prince Frederik of Hesse
- Charles XIV John of Sweden and Norway
- Oscar I of Sweden
- Charles XV of Sweden

== Gallery ==
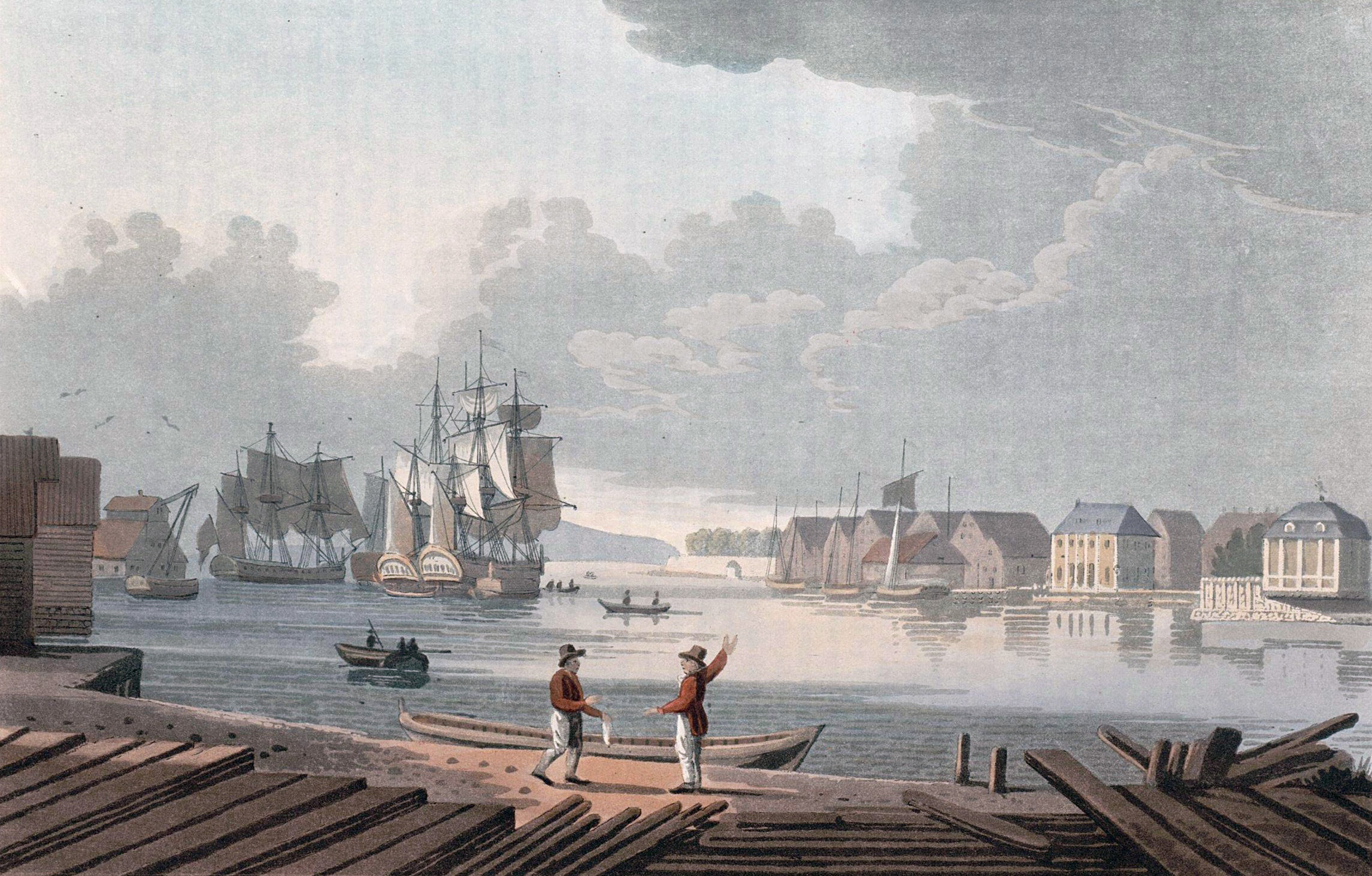
Harbour of Christiania with Paléet visible in the corner

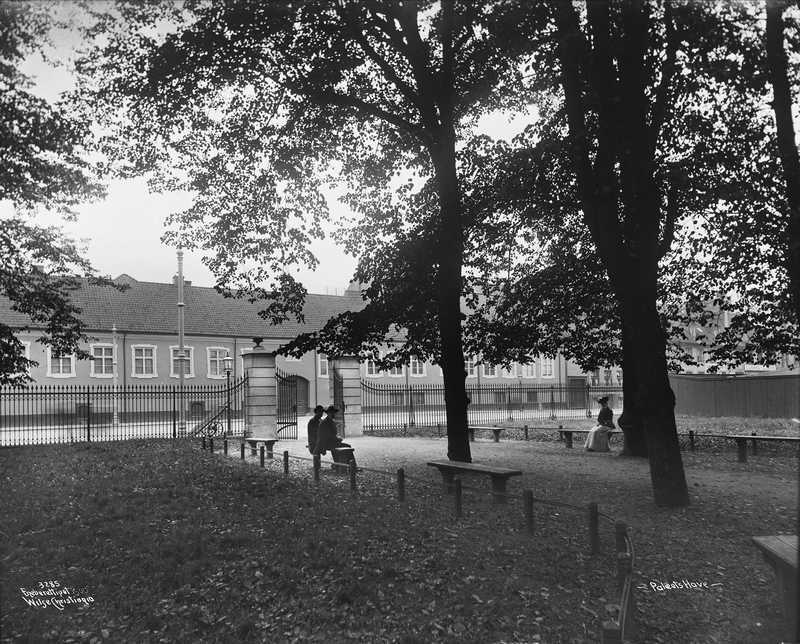
Paléet seen from Paléhaven

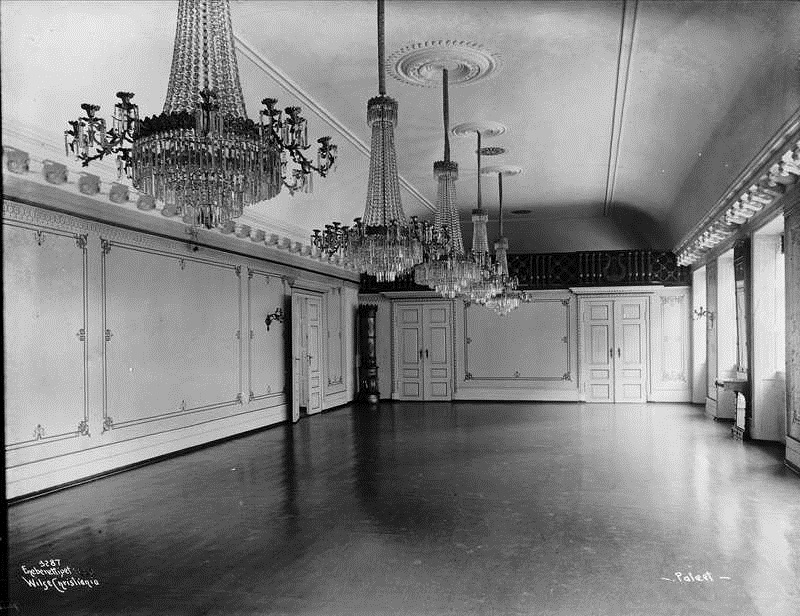
The ballroom hall

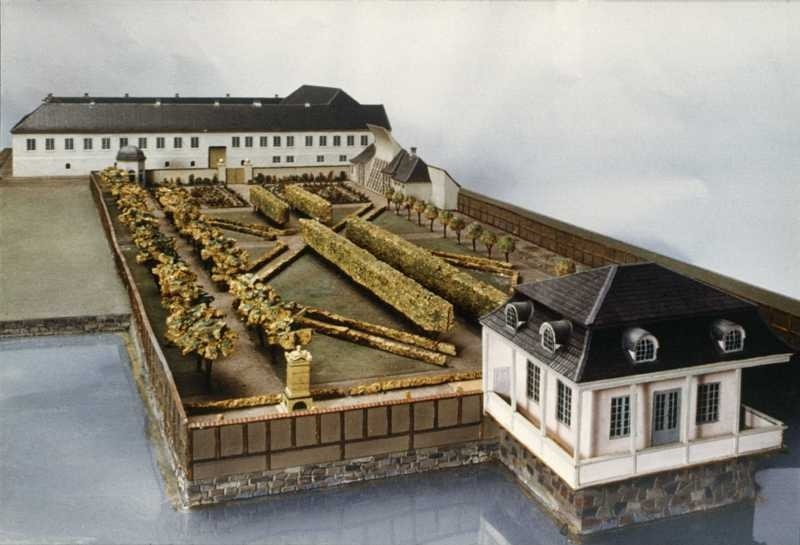
Model of Paléet

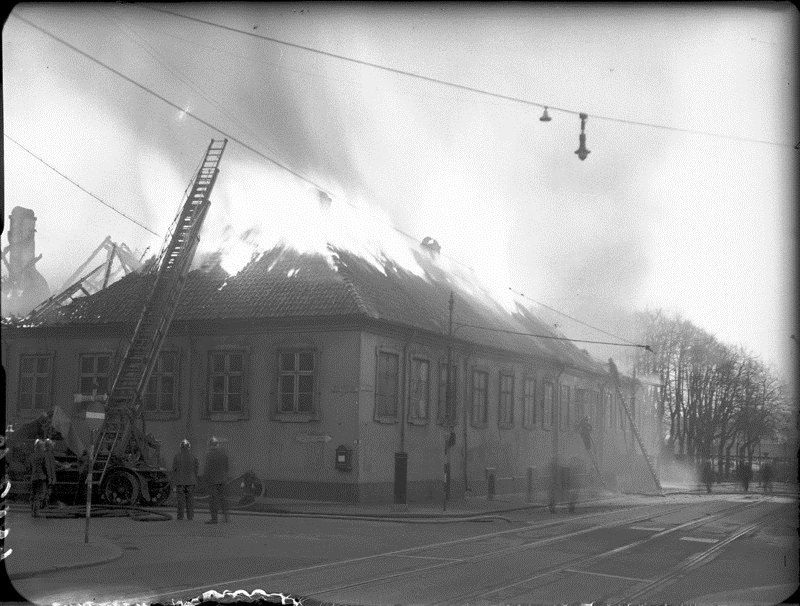
Paléet during the devastating fire in 1942

== Sources ==
- Ludvig Daae: Det gamle Christiania 1624-1814. Anden omarbeidede og forøgede Udgave. J.W. Cappelens Forlag. Christiania 1891, pages 253-289
- Thor Bendz Kielland: Paléet i Oslo. Constitutionsværkets Vugge. Gyldendal Norsk Forlag. Oslo 1939
- Oslo byleksikon. Kunnskapsforlaget. Oslo 2000.
- Monica Mørk and Ulf Holmene: Kong Christian Frederik og Paleet i Christiania og sommerresidensen på Ladegaardsøen, from Jørn Holme (red.): De kom fra alle kanter - Eidsvollsmennene og deres hus, Cappelen Damm 2014
