= Bernt Anker =

Norwegian merchant, chamberlain and playwright

Bernt Anker FRS
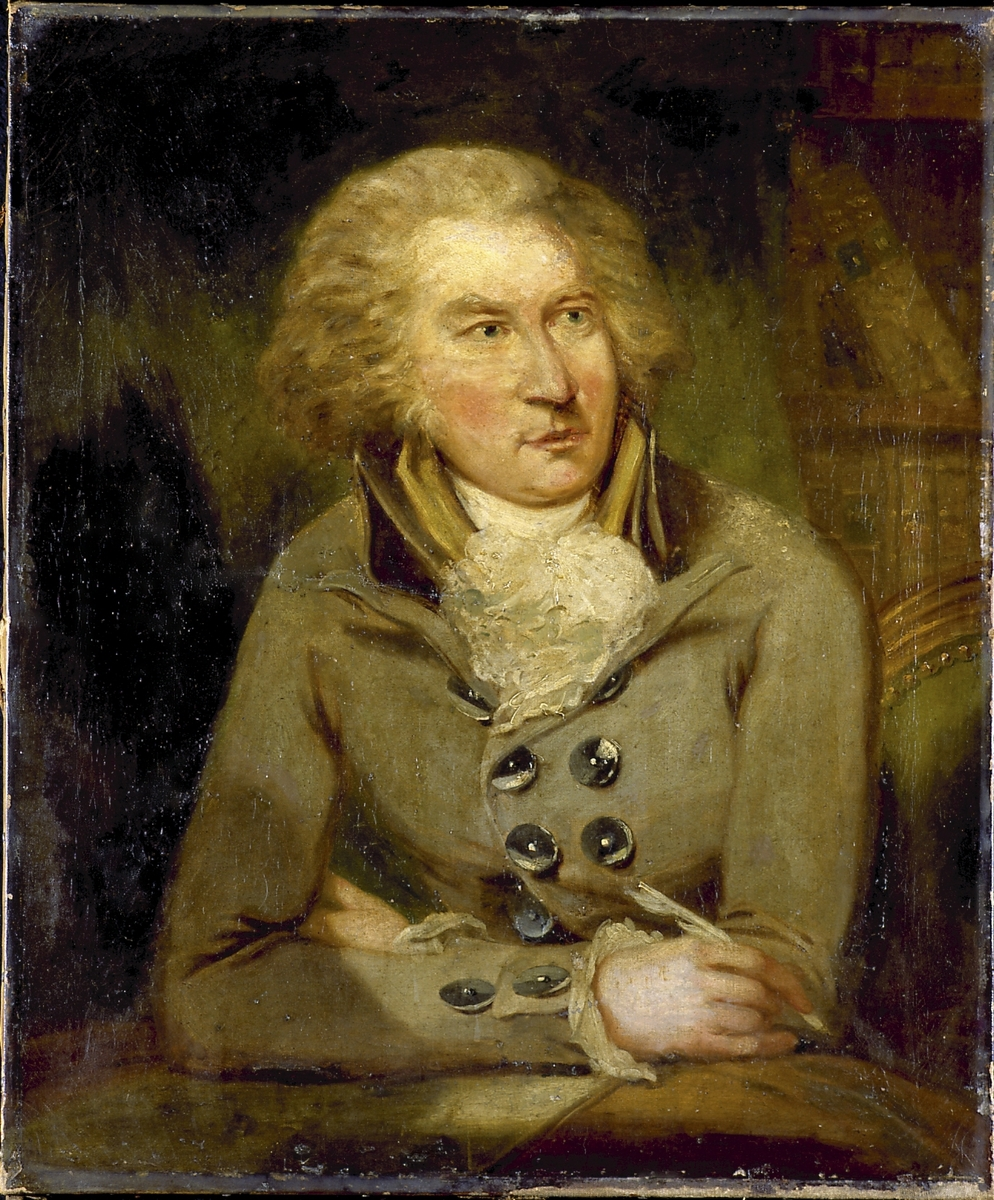
- Painting of Bernt Anker, by Carl Frederik von Breda
- Born: 22 November 1746; Christiania, Norway
- Died: 21 April 1805 (aged 58); Copenhagen, Denmark
- Occupations: Merchant, chamberlain and playwright
- Spouse: Mathia Collett (m. 1773; died 1801)
- Parent: Christian Ancher

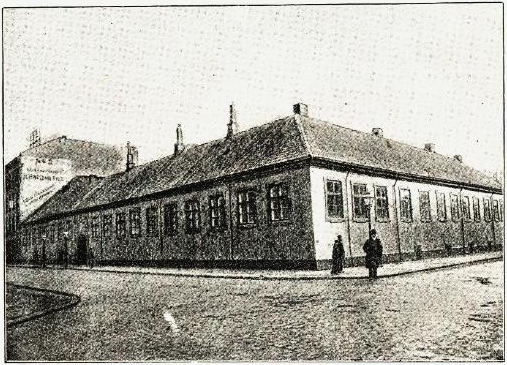
Paleet, Anker's home

Bernt Anker (22 November 1746 – 21 April 1805) was a Norwegian merchant, chamberlain and playwright who became the wealthiest person in Norway during his lifetime. Born in Christiania (now Oslo), he amassed his fortune primarily through timber trade with the Royal Navy of England and owned numerous properties including Frogner Manor, Moss Jernverk, and his residence Paléet. Beyond his commercial endeavours, Anker made contributions to Norway's cultural and civic development, founding the Dramatic Society in Christiania in 1780, where he wrote, directed and performed in theatrical productions. He was elected Fellow of the Royal Society in 1782 and was decorated Knight of the Order of the Dannebrog in 1803. Though not formally a diplomat, Anker's cultural patronage and strategic relationships with Danish authorities helped assert Norwegian identity within Denmark–Norway, laying groundwork for later independence movements.

== Biography ==
Anker was born in Christiania, the son of Christian Ancher, brother of Peder Anker and cousin of Carsten Anker. His business included trade in timber on large scale, with a large income from supplying the fleet of England. He eventually became the wealthiest person in Norway. Among his properties were Frogner Manor and Moss Jernverk. His massive home Paléet near Bjørvika was used as a Royal residence after his death, until the completion of the Royal Palace in Christiania.

He was elected a Fellow of the Royal Society of London in 1782. He was decorated Knight of the Order of the Dannebrog in 1803.

A street in Oslo, Bernt Ankers gate, is named after him.

== Amateur theatre and cultural patronage ==
In 1780 Anker was one of the five initiators of the Dramatic Society in Christiania, writing, directing and frequently starring in its productions. He extended this passion to his Moss Jernverk estate, where in 1784 he established another theatre hall and staged several of his own plays and prologues for family and friends. Østberg argues that Anker viewed such amateur performance as more refined than the travelling professional troupes of the day, believing that "conditioned dilettantes" could elevate the literary quality of theatre and civilise social manners.

Underlying the Society's operations was a strict ban on profit‑making: its statutes forbade use of the hall for anything other than free performances by members, and any sale of the building would revert its proceeds to the city poor fund. This model of patron‑driven, non‑commercial theatre fostered a sustained culture of private performance that endured for over two generations in Christiania.

== Public life and proto‑democratic practices ==
Anker's amateur‑theatre endeavours also functioned as a training ground for more participatory social and organisational forms. Membership of the Dramatic Society was open to "all young people of decent conduct, irrespective of rank or status", and general assemblies allowed men and women alike to vote on the board of directors, with the direktrise granted a double vote in recognition of her status. At times of dissent, the Society even held secret ballot, using black and white balls, demonstrating an early Norwegian exercise in collective decision making.

Beyond internal governance, the cross-class casting of roles encouraged participants to experience others' perspectives and engage in a playful rehearsal of alternative social relations. Østberg suggests that by enacting both aristocratic and common parts together on stage, Christiania's elite developed a spirit of convivial equality that anticipated later democratic attitudes in civic life.

== Legacy in Norwegian nation‑building ==
Although never a formal diplomat, Anker's theatrical "performances" and cultured hospitality served as an unofficial ambassadorship for Norway. By entertaining foreign visitors in lavish, anglophile‑style company and promoting Norwegian interests—such as the founding of a national bank—he leveraged his cultural prestige into political influence. Østberg credits these activities with helping to assert a distinct Norwegian identity within Denmark–Norway, preparing the way for later independence movements.

Moreover, Anker's use of print media to champion local commercial rights and his theatre writings both cemented his role as an opinions leader. His example spurred other members of the Christiania elite to engage more publicly in economic and cultural debates, thereby advancing a proto‑public sphere that would underpin the growth of constitutional and democratic aspirations in early nineteenth‑century Norway.

== Political strategy and relations with the Danish government ==
Bernt Anker pursued a pragmatic approach to Copenhagen's authority, preferring collaboration over confrontation. According to Bård Frydenlund (as reported by Erik Helmer Pedersen), Anker "saw his advantage in collaboration, rather than open opposition" and leveraged his personal connections to maintain the Anker family’s extensive influence across commerce and culture. Anker likewise "consistently kept out of Denmark's grain trade", focusing his activities on timber exports rather than challenging the Danish crown's corn monopoly. This strategy of working within the system was carried on by his brother Peder Anker, who after 1814 allied with Swedish interests to protect Norway's commercial autonomy.
