= Autumn 1814 Norwegian Constituent Assembly election =

- Autumn 1814

All 81 seats in the Storting 41 seats needed for a majority

Constituent Assembly elections were held in Norway during the Autumn of 1814. The Assembly approved the November constitution, ratified the Union with Sweden and disbanded. As political parties were not officially established until 1884, all those elected were independents.

== Results ==
Party	Seats
Independents	81
Total	81
Source: NSSDS
