= Bogstad =

Historic manor house in Oslo, Norway

Coordinates: 59.9655°N 10.6423°E

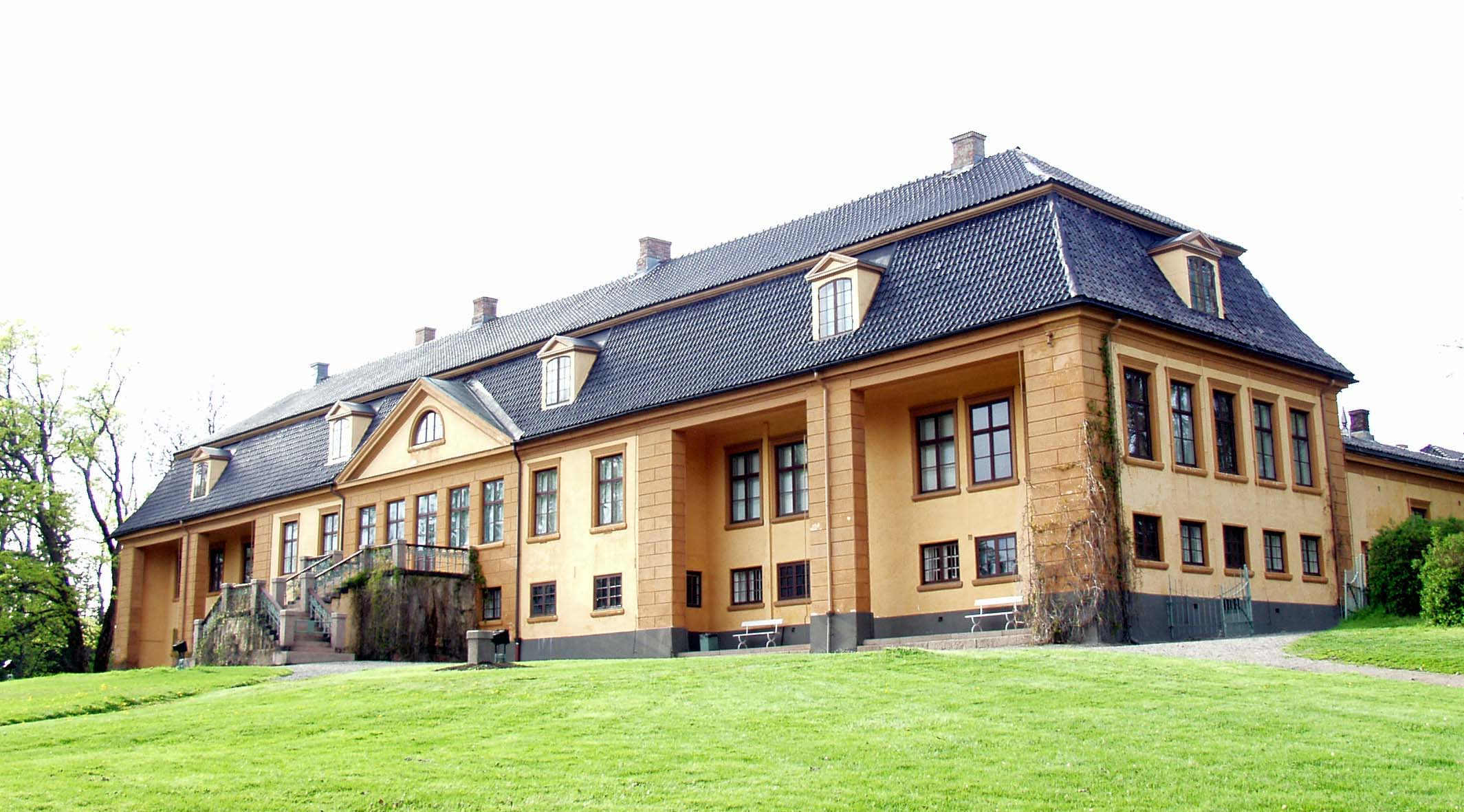
Bogstad Manor

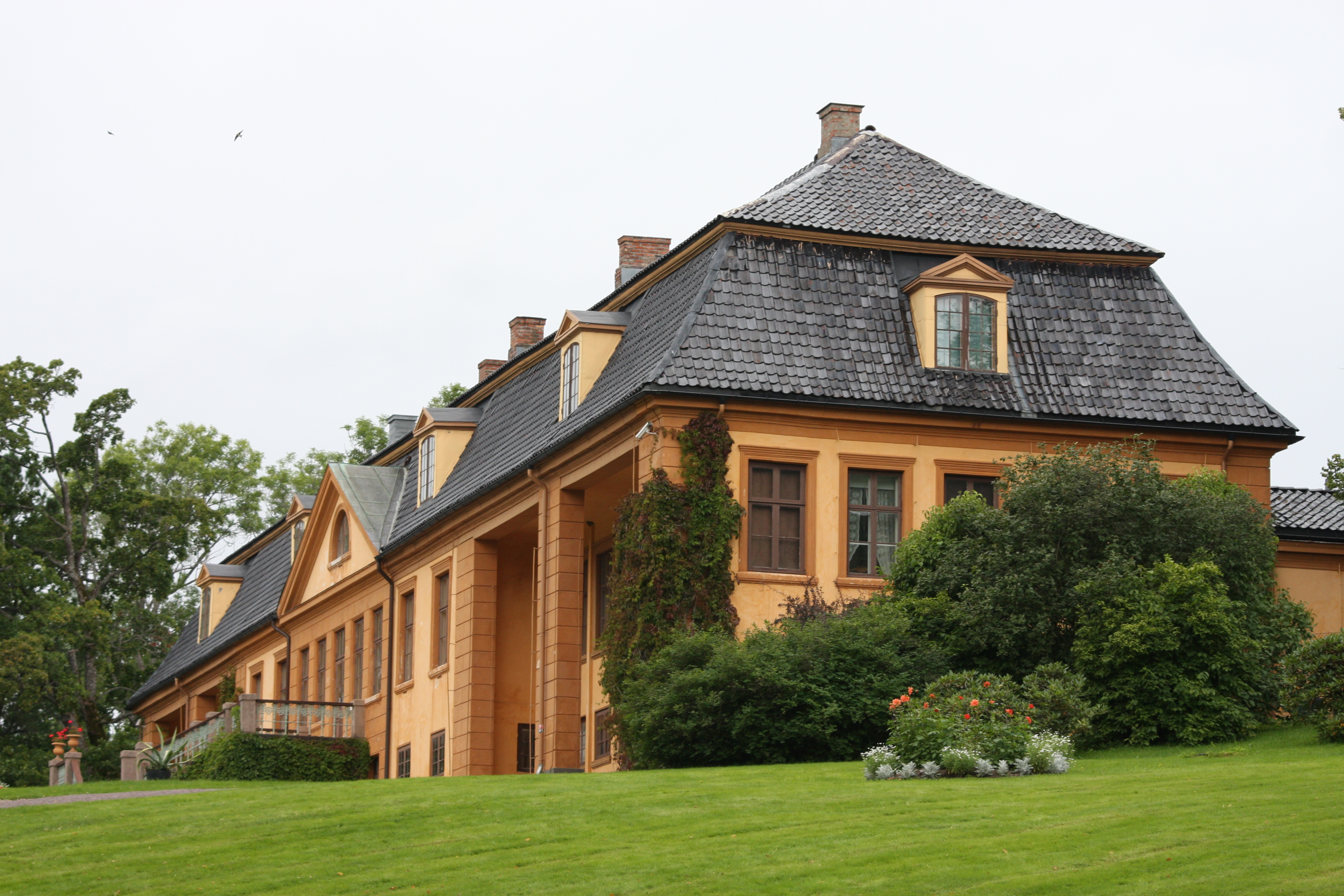
Bogstad Manor

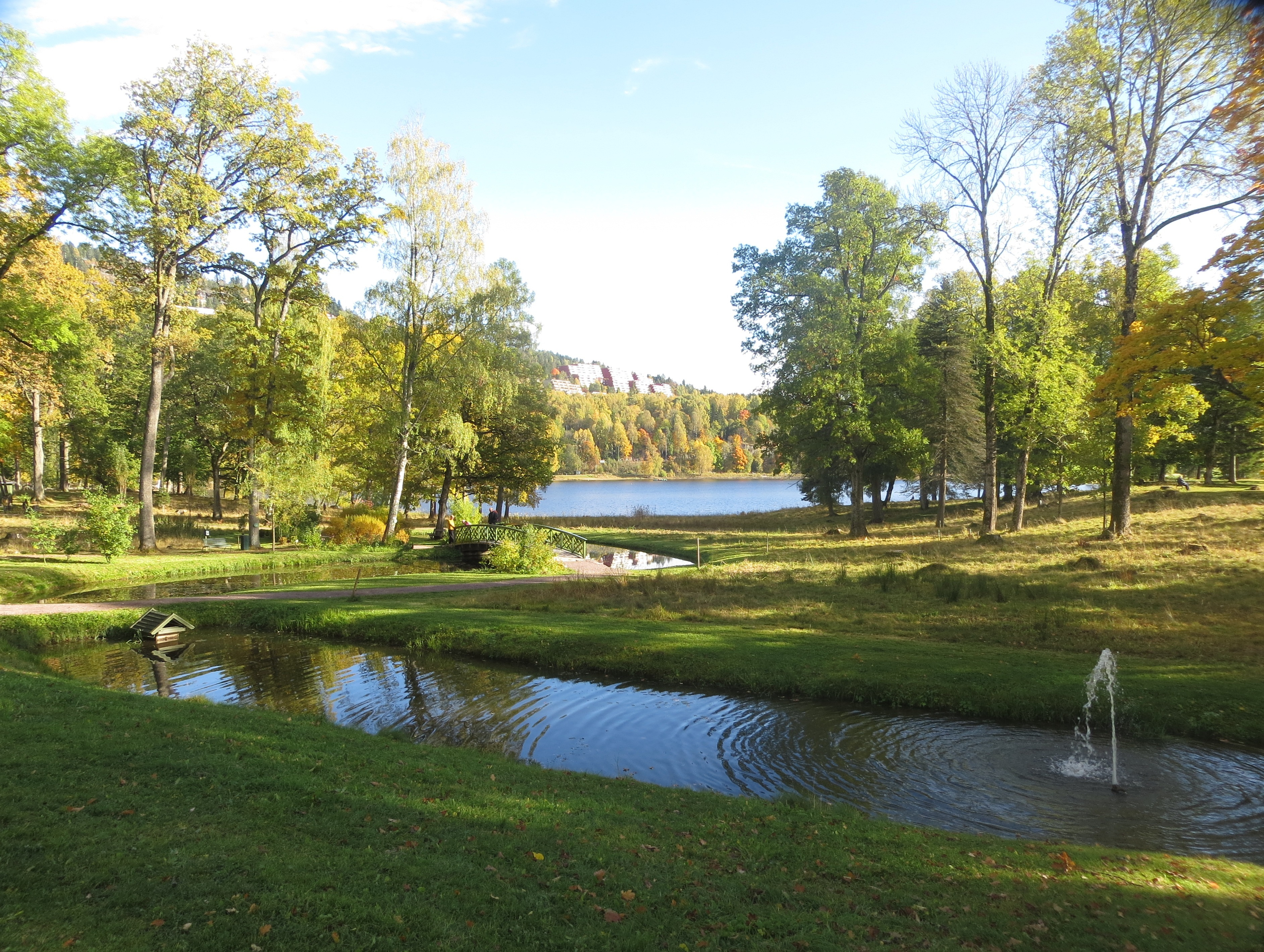
Bogstad gård at Bogstadvannet in Sørkedalen

Bogstad Manor (Bogstad gård) is a historic manor house and former estate located in the borough of Vestre Aker in Oslo, Norway. It is situated in the northwestern part of Oslo.

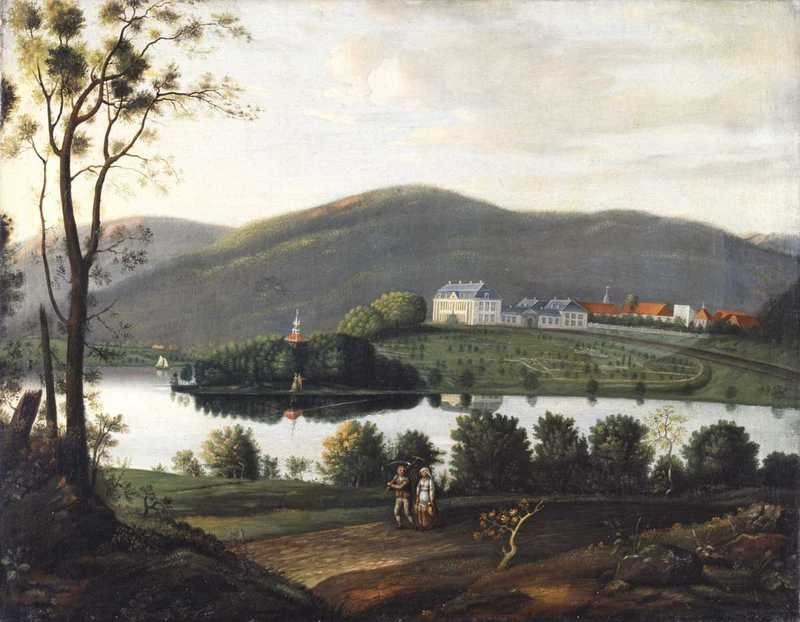
Bogstad gård by Frederik Petersen (ca. 1800)

== Background ==
Bogstad has its origin in a farm which was located near Bogstadvannet, a lake in the valley of Sørkedalen. The farm was owned by several notable people. It went from merchant and councilman Peder Nielsen Leuch (1692–1746) and his family to Norwegian Prime Minister Peder Anker, then to his son-in-law Governor of Norway Herman Wedel Jarlsberg via his marriage to Karen Anker, the only child of Peder Anker. The property included forested acreage which provided the basis for sawmills and timber trade. Timber trader and landowner Morten Leuch was the owner of Bogstad estate from 1756. Bernt Anker later acquired the estate through marriage with Leuch's widow, Mathia Collett.

Peder Anker utilized the slope from the main house down to Bogstadvannet for development with curved paths and artificial creeks. The landscape was further developed from 1780. The estate was developed with a larger manor house in 1785. The last private owners were Nini Wedel-Jarlsberg (1880–1945) and Westye Parr Egeberg (1877–1959).

The property has been owned by Oslo municipality since 1954. The manor house is owned by Bogstad Foundation and operated as a museum in cooperation with the Norwegian Museum of Cultural History. The manor house dating from between 1760 and 1780 was built in the style of Classicist architecture and is a typical example of building styles for the period. Bogstad Manor has been fully furnished with paintings, chandeliers, furniture and other furnishings from the period 1750–1850. Guided tours of the museum are available during summer months.

Bogstad has become the name of a neighborhood of northwest Oslo which includes the area of Bogstad Manor and Bogstad Golf Course operated by the Oslo Golf Club (Oslo Golfklubb).

== Primary source ==
- Hauge, Yngvar, Nini Egeberg (1960) Bogstad, 1773-1995 (Oslo: H. Aschehoug)

== Other sources ==
- Roede, Lars (2010) To gårder – to brødre. Mye om Frogner og litt om Bogstad (Oslo: Boksenteret/Bogstad stiftelse) ISBN 978-82-92865-03-3
- Hopstock, Carsten (1997) Bogstad - et storgods gjennom 300 år (Oslo: Boksenteret/Bogstad stiftelse) ISBN 82-7683-166-4
