= Bård Frydenlund =

Norwegian historian

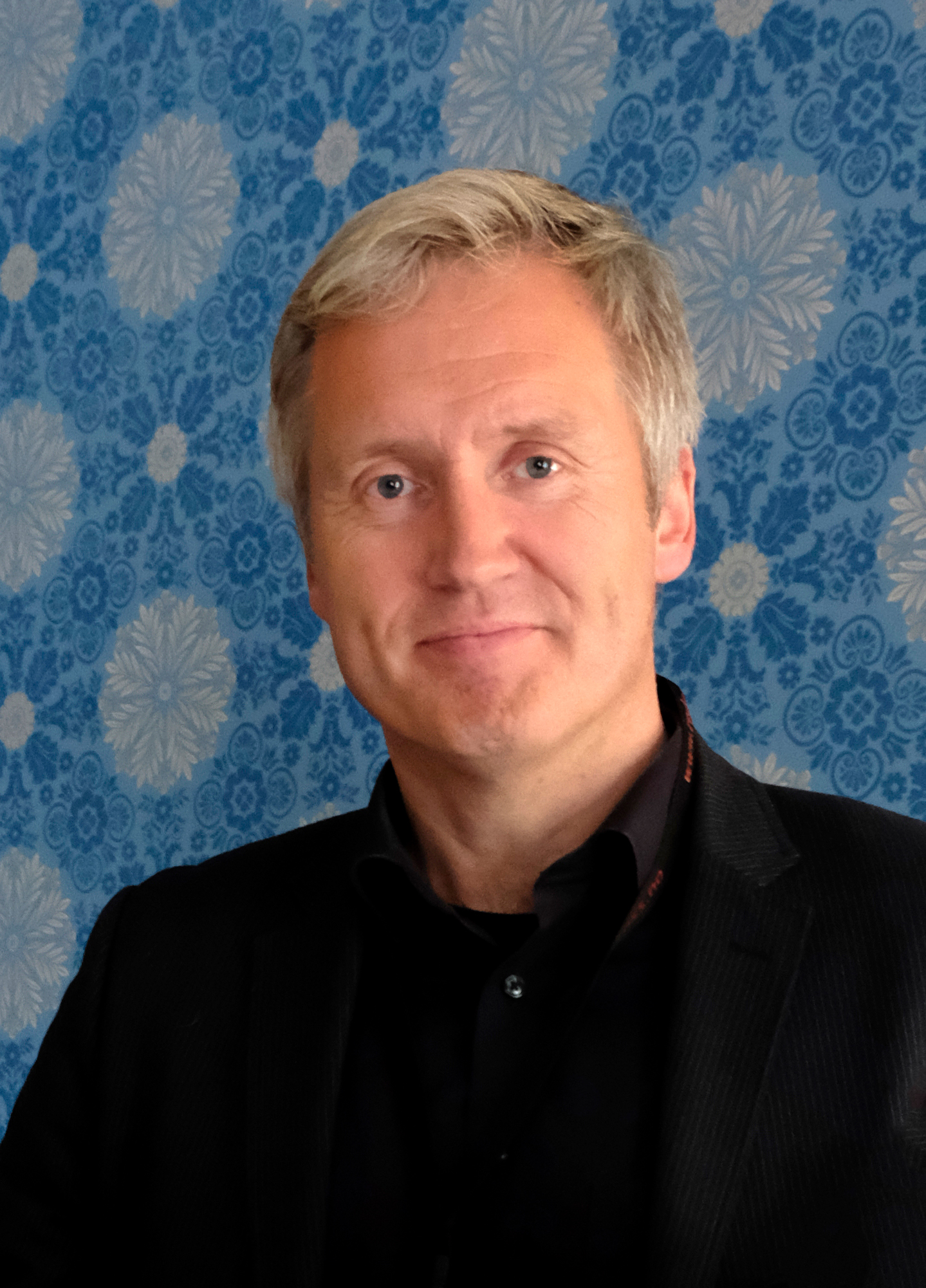
- Frydenlund in 2018
- Born: 11 July 1972 (age 54); Ringerike, Norway
- Occupation: director (CEO) at Eidsvoll 1814
- Employer: Norsk Folkemuseum

Bård Frydenlund (born 11 July 1972) is the director (CEO) at Eidsvoll 1814 in Norway. He is the former CEO at Næs Jernverksmuseum.

He is an author and a historian, and has a background as researcher and teacher at IAKH – Department of Archaeology, Conservation and History, University of Oslo. His field of expertise is Norway and Scandinavia in the age of revolutions - political history, trade networks and social elites.

Frydenlund was formerly head of the Student Parliament of the University of Oslo (1998) and policy advisor for former rector (vice chancellor) Kaare R. Norum at the University of Oslo (2000-2001). He has been working as an advisor at the Ministry of Education and Research (2004), as book review editor at Historisk Tidsskrift (Norway) (2005-2009), and as board member of the University of Oslo (2010-2012). In 2009 he published the biography of Norway's first prime minister Peder Anker. Frydenlund is currently chairman of ABM-Media AS (the media house for the archive, library and museum's sector in Norway).

== Selected bibliography ==
- 2008: Christianias handelspatrisiat. En elite i 1700-tallets Norge. Edited by John Peter Collett & Bård Frydenlund
- 2009: 1807 og Danmark-Norge. På vei mot atskillelsen. Edited by Bård Frydenlund & Rasmus Glenthøj
- 2009: Stormannen Peder Anker. En biografi.
- 2013: Veivalg for Norden 1809-1813. Edited by Bård Frydenlund & Odd Arvid Storsveen
- 2014: Fangen på Bogstad. Co-authors Madeleine von Essen & Else Espeland
- 2014: Spillet om Norge. Det politiske året 1814.
- 2015: Smak av frihet. 1814-grunnloven - historisk virkning og sosial forankring. Edited by Odd Arvid Storsveen, Amund Pedersen & Bård Frydenlund
