= Christian Braunmann Tullin =

Norwegian businessman & poet (1728–1765)

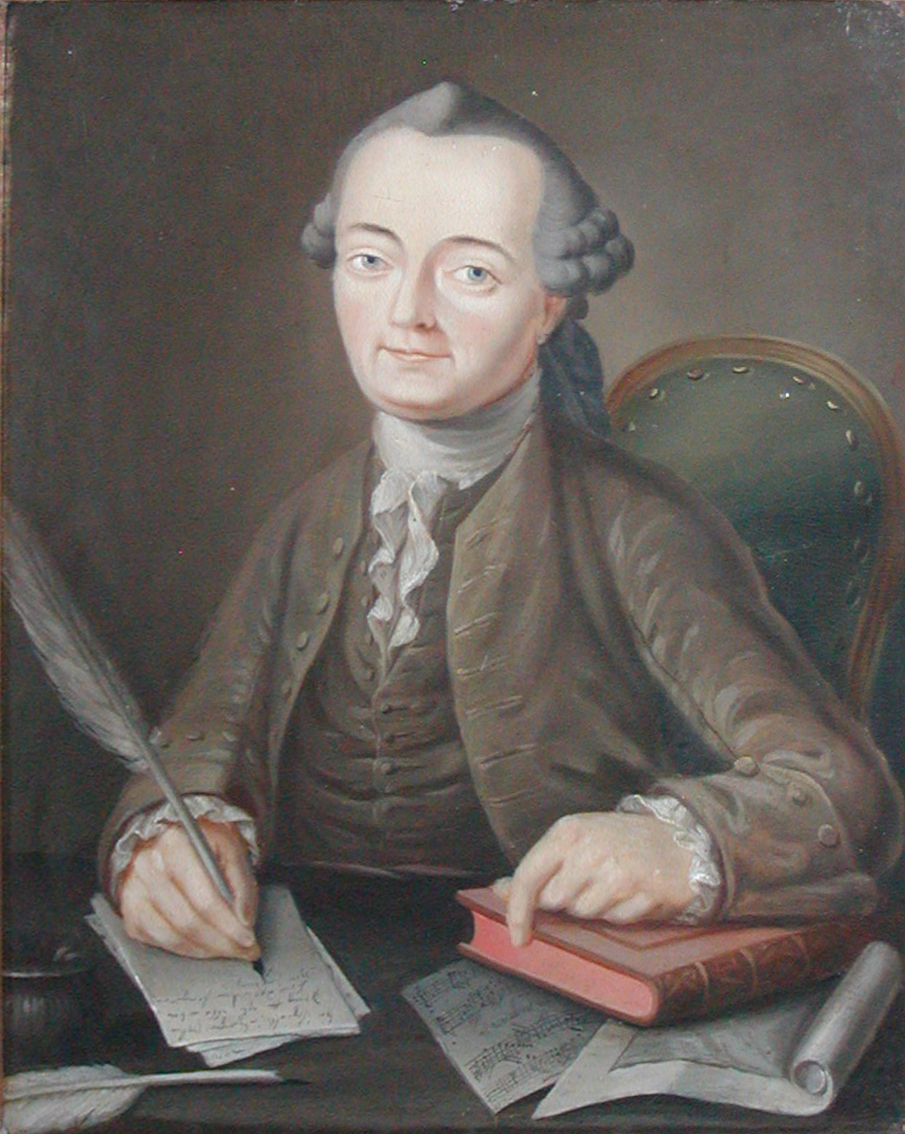
- Portrait of Christian Braunmann Tullin, 1760. Oslo Museum
- Born: 6 September 1728; Christiania, Norway
- Died: 21 January 1765 (aged 36)
- Education: University of Copenhagen
- Occupations: Businessman and poet

Christian Braunmann Tullin (6 September 1728 – 21 January 1765) was a Norwegian businessman and poet. He was regarded as one of Denmark–Norway's most important poetic talents by his contemporaries.

== Biography ==
Tullin was born in Christiania (now Oslo), Norway. His parents were Gulbrand Hansen Tullins (1694–1742) and Ragnhild Hansdatter Dehli (1695–1765). His father, who originated in the rural district of Ringebu, had become a wealthy merchant. Tullin attended Christiania Cathedral School and later graduated from the University of Copenhagen with a theology diploma in 1748.

After his father's death, his mother married Claus Therkelsen Koefoed, who was a customs official. Together with his step-father, in 1750 Tullin started Faabro Pudder- og Stivelsesfabrik, a company which produced powder, starch and nails. It was located at Granfossen on Lysakerelva. He also built a summer residence at the factories, directly above the nail factory. This building was later taken over by O. Mustad & Søn.

In 1759, Tullin became the customs inspector of Christiania. In 1760, he became a custodian in the city. He became city manager for Christiania from 1763. He was also chairman of the Board of Customs and Excise Service (Oslo regiontollsted) and in 1764 the Customs Director.

== Personal life ==
In 1760, he married Mette Feddersen Kruckow (1725–1809). She was a niece of Nicolai Feddersen (1699–1769), who was magistrate president of Christiania, and his wife Ditlevine Feddersen.

== Works ==
Samtlige Skrifter was issued in Copenhagen between 1770–1773 in three volumes. The first volume contained his poetry, while the two others contained essays. These works have been re-published over time including in a four volume set published between 1972 and 1976 by Gyldendal Norsk Forlag.
