= Peder Anker =

First Prime Minister of Norway

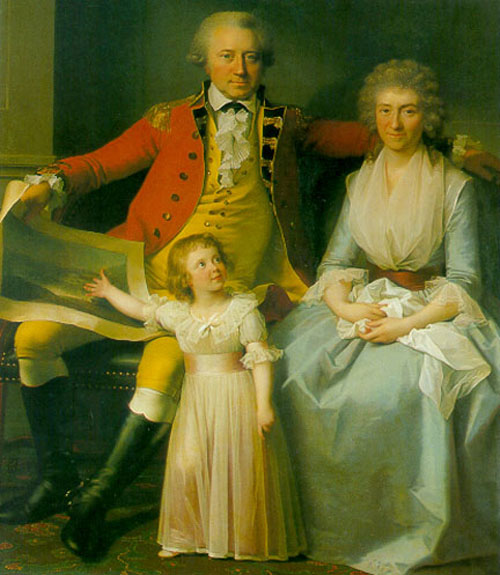
- Anker and his family

Norwegian Prime Minister in Stockholm
- In office 18 November 1814 – 30 June 1822
- Monarchs: Charles II; Charles III John
- Preceded by: Position established
- Succeeded by: Mathias Sommerhielm

Personal details
- Born: 8 December 1749 Christiania, Denmark-Norway
- Died: 10 December 1824 (aged 75) Christiania, Kingdom of Sweden and Norway
- Spouse: Anna Elisabeth Cold
- Children: Karen Wedel-Jarlsberg

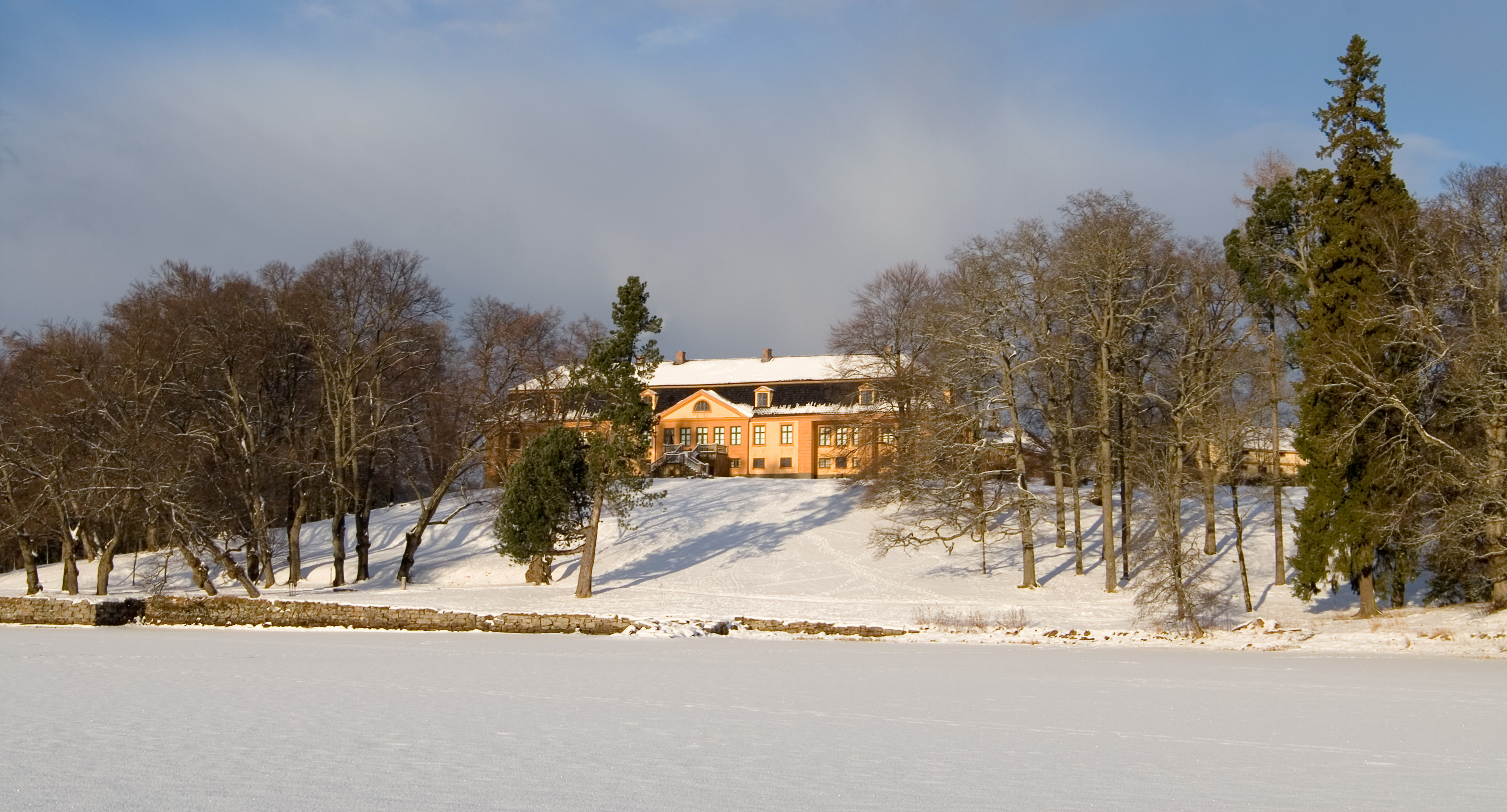
Bogstad Manor

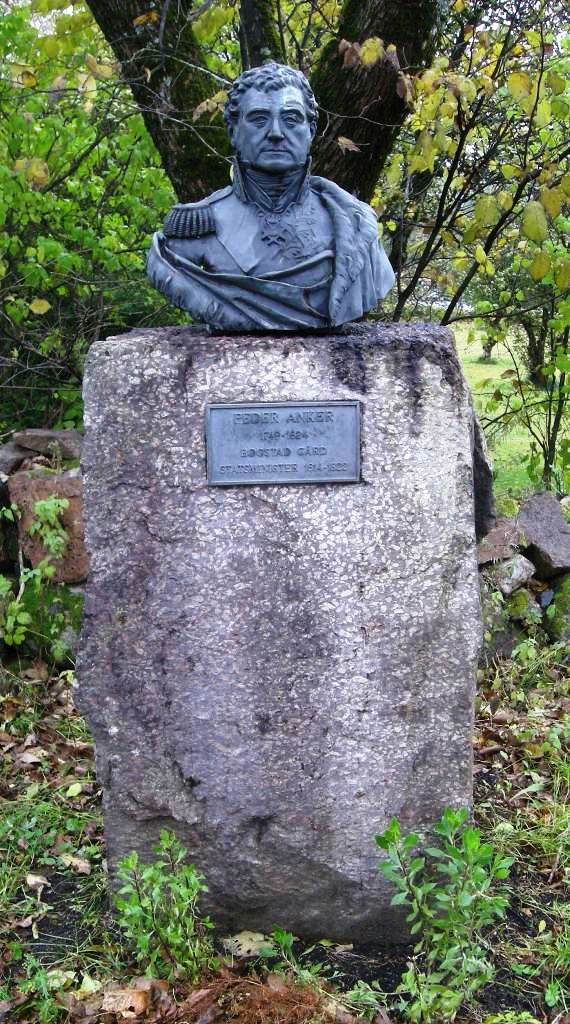
Memorial for Peder Anker on Peder Ankers plass in Oslo

Peder Anker (8 December 1749 – 10 December 1824) was a prominent Norwegian landowner, businessman and politician. He served as the first prime minister of Norway from 1814 until 1822.

== Biography ==
Peder Anker was a member of a Danish-Norwegian noble family. He was born in Christiania, the son of the wealthy merchant Christian Ancher. He had three brothers: Iver, Bernt and Jess. Following education in Christiania and a year as student at the University of Copenhagen, Peder Anker and his brothers spent five years traveling with private tutors in Great Britain, France and Germany. They were pupils of the noted Swedish naturalist Carl von Linné at Uppsala University in 1764. He was granted Danish nobility in 1778 and was awarded the title of General War Commissioner in 1788.

Peder Anker bought Bogstad Manor with additional forest land and extended the existing house to make a splendid mansion. Bogstad had for about 100 years belonged to members of the Leuch family, his grandmother's family. He also acquired iron mines and foundries, notably Bærums Verk and Hakadal Verk. The Vækerø manor (Vækerø gård) near Oslo was established as a port for the export of lumber. Anker rose to become one of Norway's richest individuals.

Peder Anker was a delegate to the Norwegian Constituent Assembly at Eidsvoll in 1814, representing Akershus Amt. He distinguished himself as a "unionist", whose members opposed complete independence for Norway. On 18 November 1814 he was appointed Prime Minister of Norway to Stockholm after the Union between Sweden and Norway was established, and remained in this office until 30 June 1822.

== Honors ==
Peder Anker was decorated with the Royal Order of the Seraphim and the Order of Charles XIII. He was awarded the Grand Cross of the Order of Dannebrog in 1812. In 1815, he was elected a member of the Royal Swedish Academy of Sciences.

== Legacy ==
Several roads in Norway have been named in honor of Peder Anker including Peder Ankers vei in Jar, Peder Anker gate in Halden, and Peder Ankers Plass in Oslo.

== Sources ==
- Frydenlund, Bård (2009) Stormannen Peder Anker : en biografi (Oslo: Aschehoug) ISBN 978-82-03-21084-6
- Government Administration Services Peder Anker

Political offices
Preceded by position created	Prime Minister of Norway; 1814–1822	Succeeded by Mathias Sommerhielm
