= 1997 in Norway =

- Centuries: 18th; 19th; 20th; 21st
- Decades: 1970s; 1980s; 1990s; 2000s; 2010s
- See also: List of years in Norway

Events in the year 1997 in Norway.

== Incumbents ==
- Monarch – Harald V.
- Prime Minister – Thorbjørn Jagland (Labour Party) until October 17, Kjell Magne Bondevik (Christian Democratic Party)

== Events ==
- 18 January – The Norwegian explorer Børge Ousland became the first to complete an unassisted Antarctic solo crossing.
- 4 June – Great Nordic Biker War: a car bomb destroyed the Bandidos motorcycle gang's Norwegian chapter headquarters in Drammen, killing Irene Astrid Bekkevold, who was passing by in her car when the bomb went off. The explosion caused widespread material damage in the area, including to the Drammens Is ice cream factory. The bombing had been planned by the Norwegian chapter of the rival Hells Angels motorcycle gang, seven members of which were eventually convicted and sentenced to prison terms from 5 to 16 years.
- 15 September – The 1997 Parliamentary election takes place. While Labour won a plurality of seats, they were unable to reach Jagland's 36,9% threshold, gaining 35% of the vote. As a result of this, the Labour government stepped down, being replaced by a centrist coalition of the Christian People's Party, Liberal Party and the Centre Party, with Kjell Magne Bondevik being appointed Prime Minister.
- 17 October – Bondevik's First Cabinet was appointed.
- 22 December – Værøy Municipality is struck by a 3.3 magnitude earthquake.

== Popular culture ==
=== Sports ===
- 29 June to 12 July – the UEFA Women's Euro 1997 was held in several cities.
- 11 to 16 August – the 1997 World Orienteering Championships were held in Grimstad.

=== Literature ===
Awards

- Sophie Prize - In 1997, Norwegian author Jostein Gaarder, renowned for his novel "Sophie's World," and his wife Siri Dannevig established the Sophie Prize. This international award, administered by the Oslo-based Sophie Foundation, aimed to inspire individuals and organizations working towards a sustainable future by recognizing outstanding efforts in environmental and sustainable development. The prize awarded recipients $100,000 annually.

==== Novels ====
- Jo Nesbø – Flaggermusmannen

== Anniversaries ==
- 1000 years since Trondheim was founded by Olav Tryggvason
- 350 years since the foundation of Posten Norge

== Notable births ==
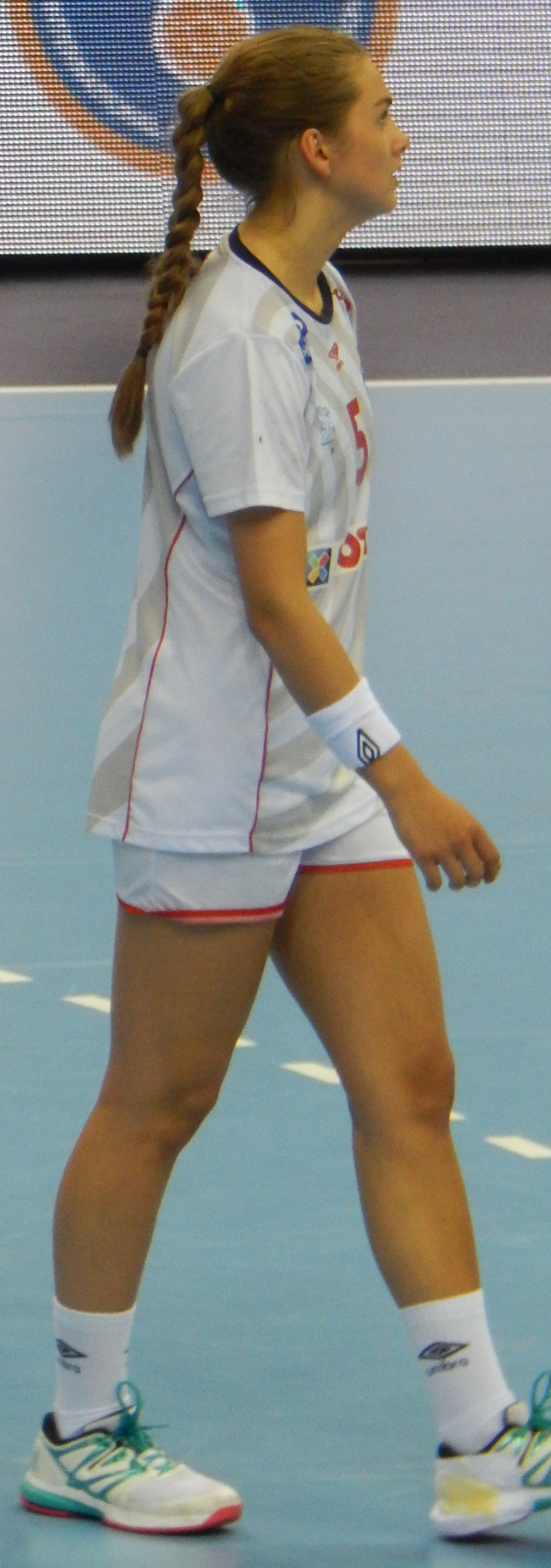
Helene Gigstad Fauske

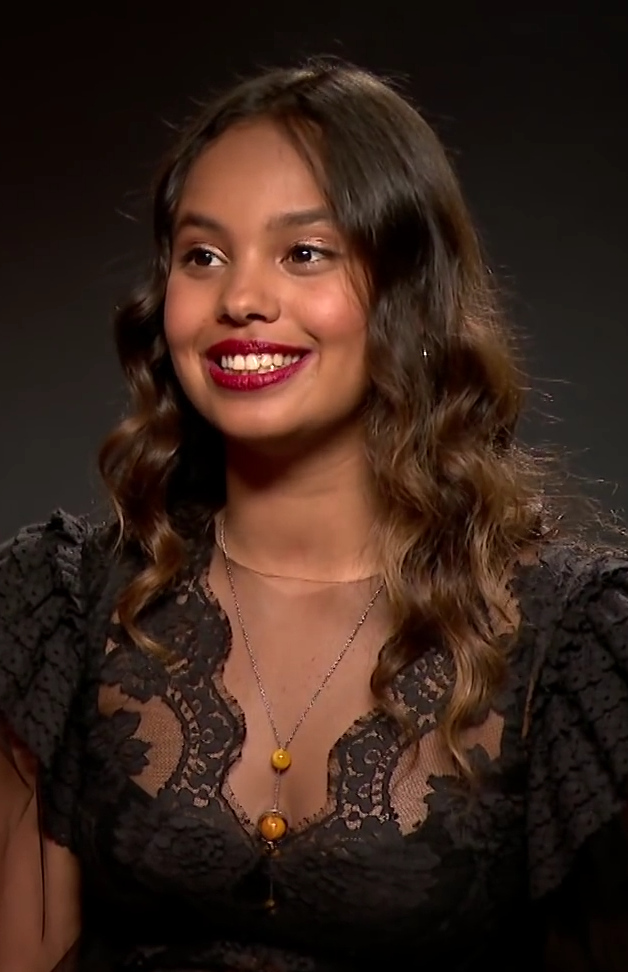
Alisha Boe

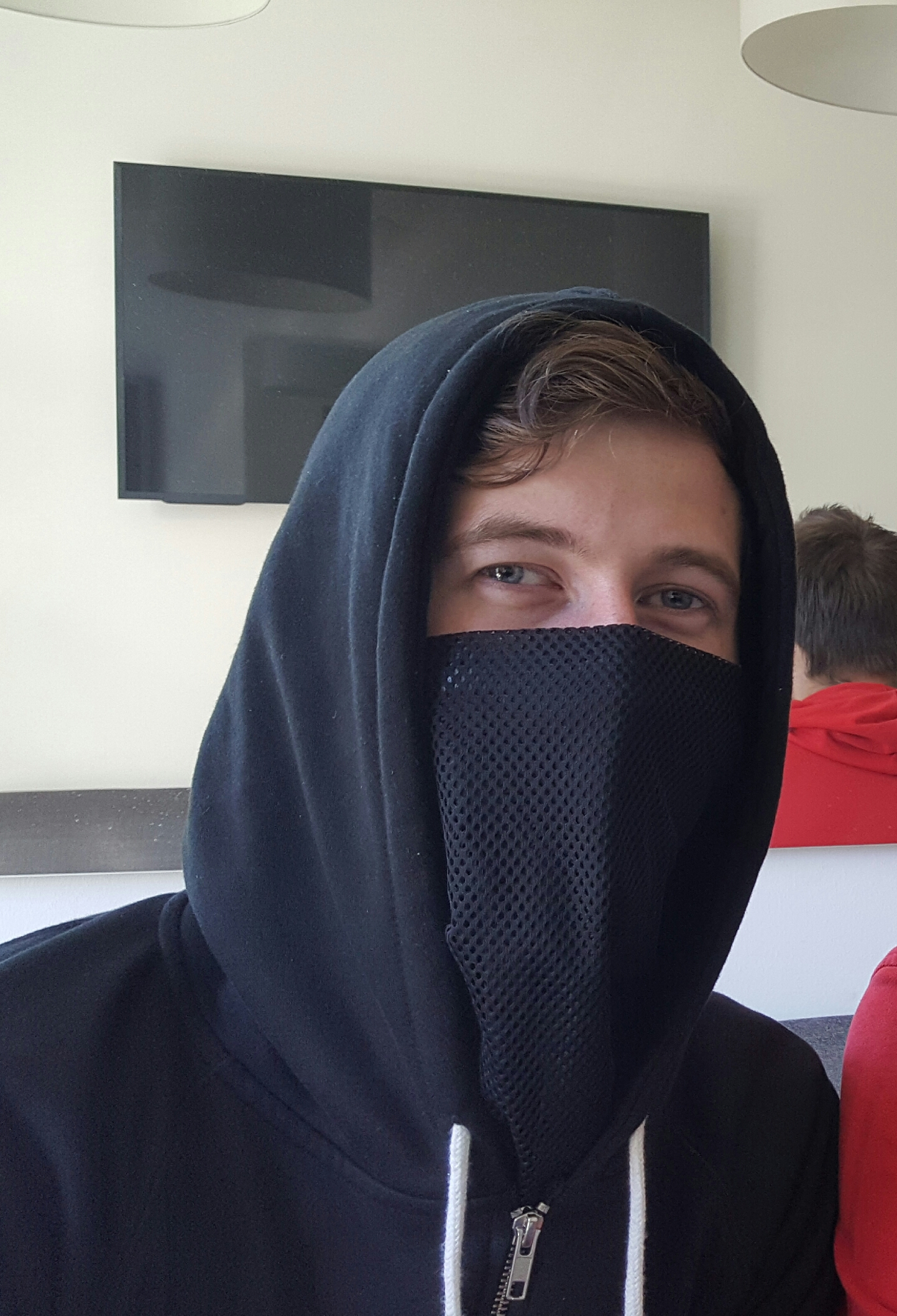
Alan Walker

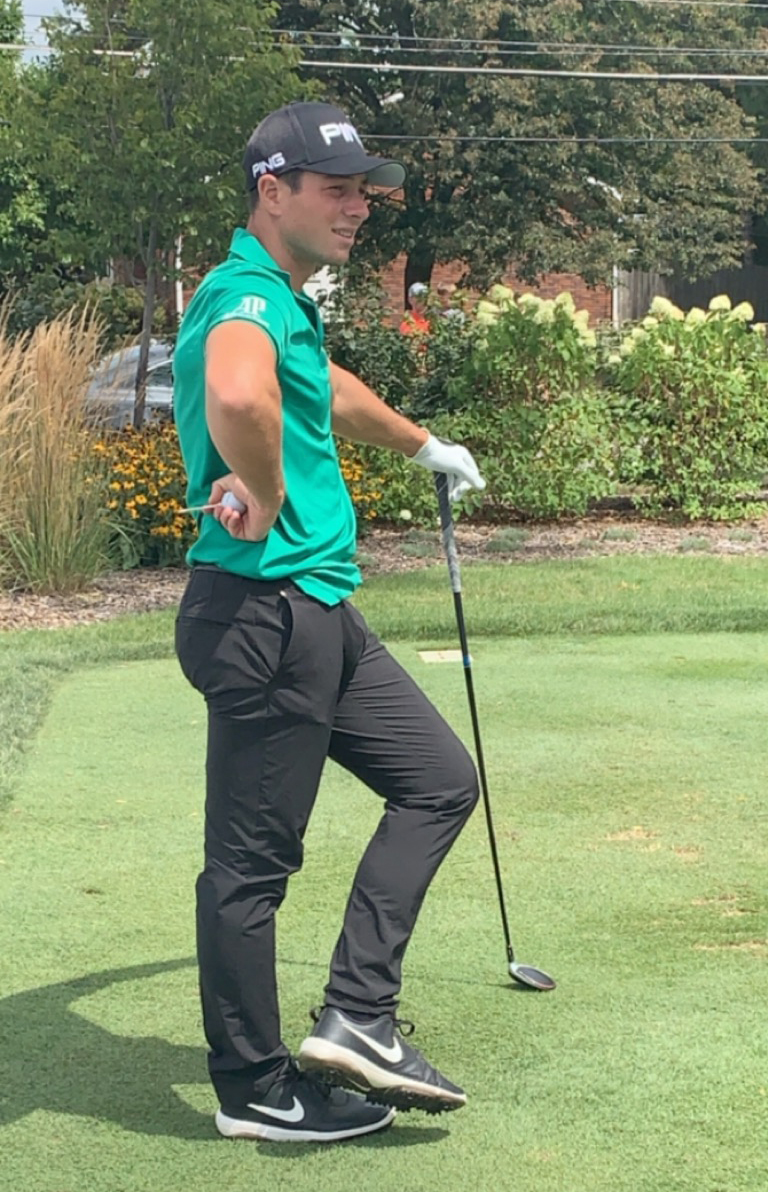
Viktor Hovland

- 9 January – Jacob Karlstrom, footballer
- 17 January – Andreas Hanche-Olsen, footballer
- 28 January – Mons Røisland, snowboarder
- 30 January – Mathias Bringaker, footballer
- 31 January – Helene Gigstad Fauske, handball player
- 3 February – Thomas Bucher-Johannessen, cross-country skier
- 4 February – Henrik Bjørdal, footballer
- 7 February – Per Magnus Steiring, footballer
- 8 February – Audun Heimdal, orienteering and ski orienteering competitor (d. 2022).
- 15 February – Marie Dølvik Markussen, footballer
- 1 March – Johannes Johannesen, ice hockey player
- 3 March – Iman Meskini, actress
- 6 March – Alisha Boe, actress
- 7 March – Thomas Hayes, actor
- 19 March – Viktor Durasovic, tennis player
- 17 April – Martin Samuelsen, footballer
- 6 May – Simen Brekkhus, footballer
- 7 May – Johan Salomon, chess player
- 10 May – Julian Kristoffersen, footballer
- 12 May – Amund Wichne, footballer
- 24 May – Magnus Fredriksen, handball player.
- 25 May – Tobias Foss, cyclist
- 11 June – Julian Veen Uldal, footballer
- 18 June – Morten Sætra, footballer
- 30 June – Mathias Gjerstrøm, footballer
- 2 July – Anders Mol, beach volleyball player
- 7 July – Magnus Abelvik Rød, handball player
- 15 July – Markus André Kaasa, footballer
- 17 July – Sigurd Hauso Haugen, footballer
- 17 July – Magnus Ramsfjell, curler
- 24 July – Jostein Ekeland, footballer
- 28 July – Sivert Solli, footballer
- 2 August – Håkon Lorentzen, footballer
- 3 August – Adrian Lillebekk Ovlien, footballer (d. 2018).
- 4 August – Tuva Hansen, footballer
- 6 August – Sander Svendsen, footballer
- 24 August (in Britain) – Alan Walker, music producer
- 27 August – Eirik Haugan, footballer
- 30 August Tobias Lauritsen, footballer
- 3 September – Sulayman Bojang, footballer
- 11 September – Erlend Dahl Reitan, footballer
- 18 September – Viktor Hovland, golf player
- 6 October – Lene Cecilia Sparrok, actress
- 15 October – Jarl Magnus Riiber, Nordic combined skier
- 28 October – Edvard Linnebo Race, footballer
- 28 October – Marcus Mehnert, footballer
- 17 November – Julian Ryerson, footballer
- 24 November – Patrick Berg, footballer
- 25 November – Mathias Rasmussen, footballer
- 14 December – Beatrice Nedberge Llano, athlete specialising in the hammer throw
- 31 December – Kjerstin Boge Solås, handball player

== Notable deaths ==
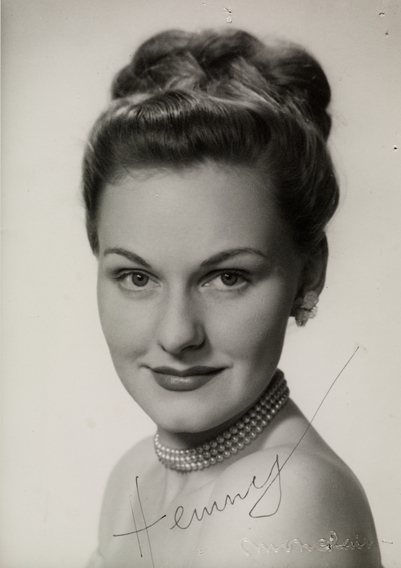
Henny Mürer

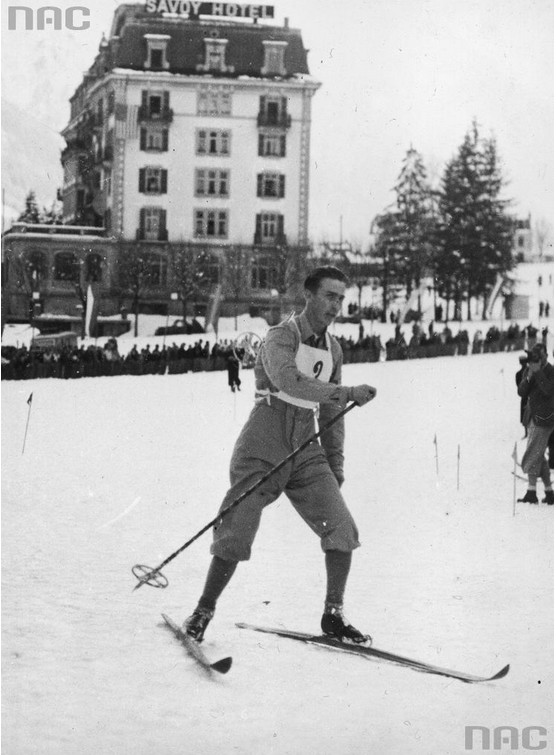
Lars Bergendahl

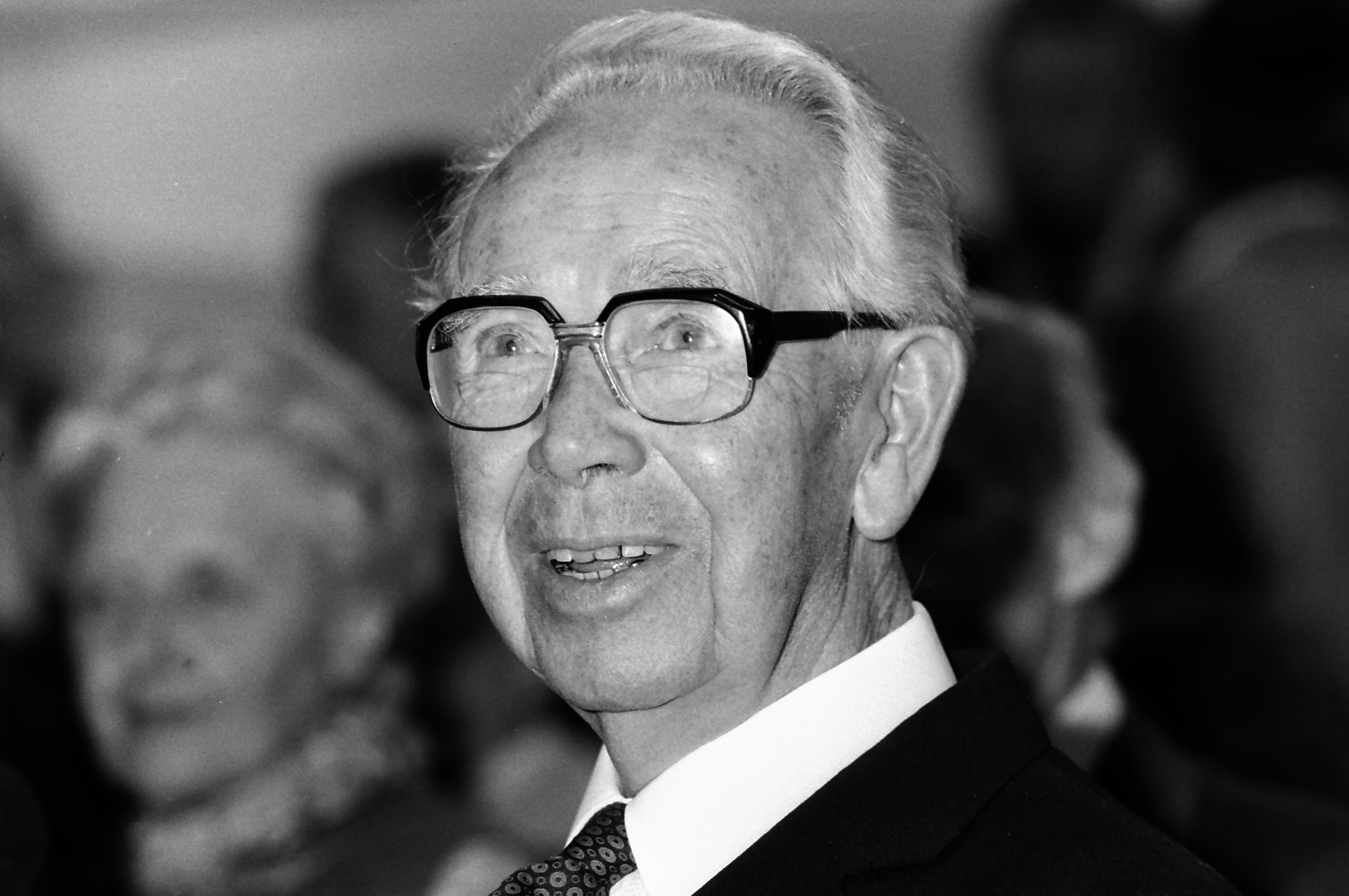
Harald Kihle

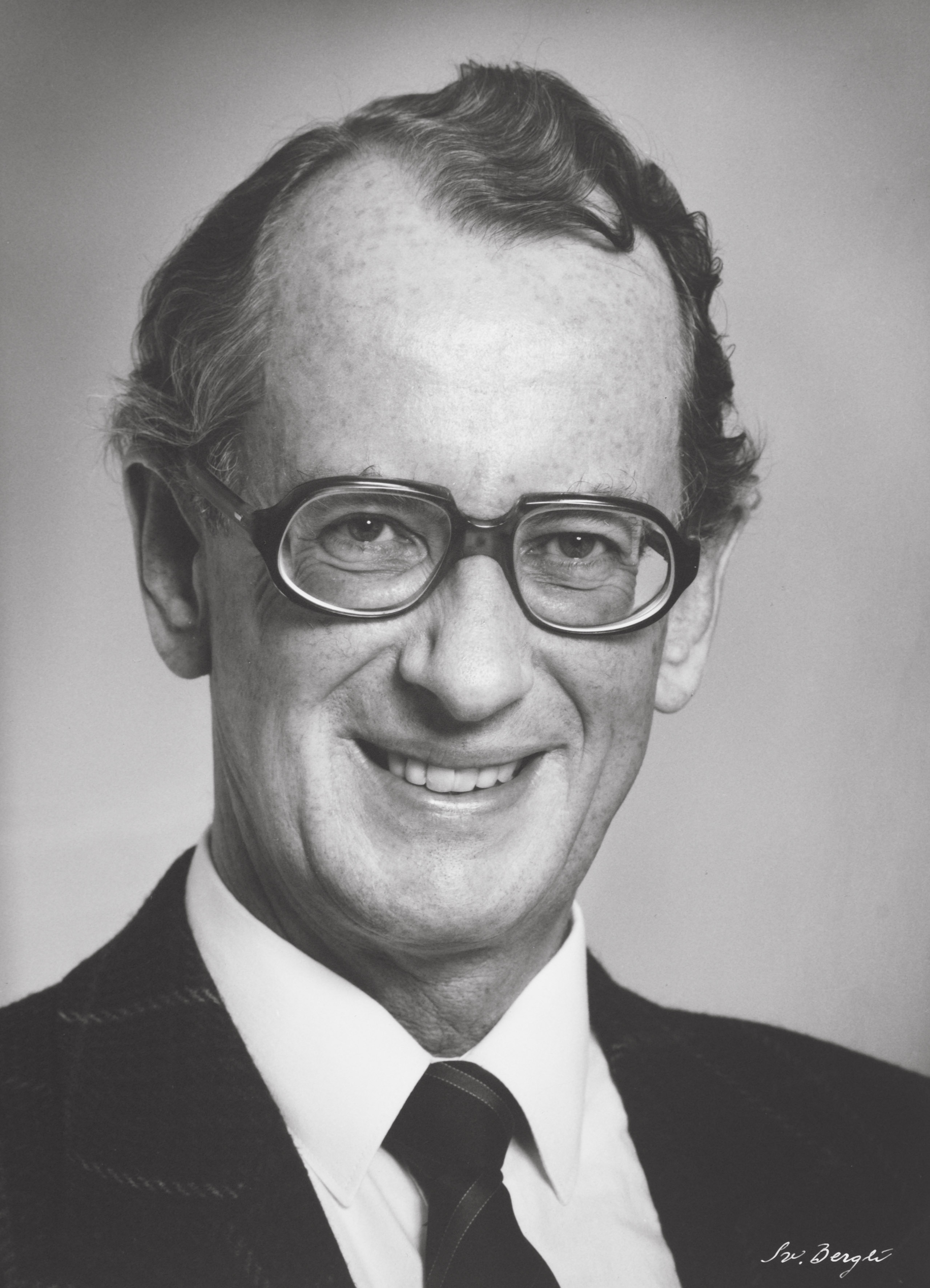
Jan P. Syse

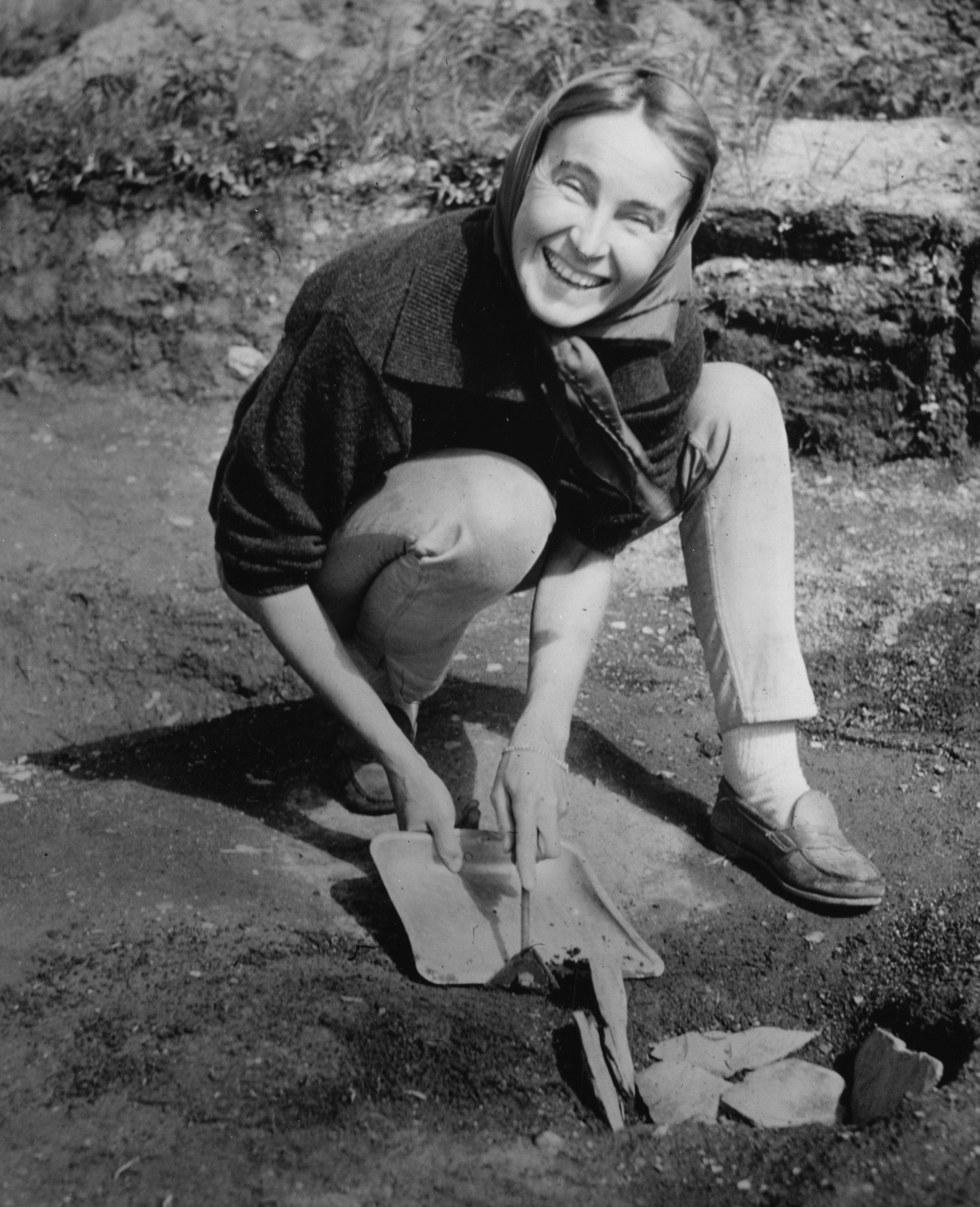
Anne Stine Ingstad

- 3 January – Jon Lennart Mjøen, actor, film director and screenwriter (b. 1912).
- 3 January – Erling Mossige, jurist and banker (1907)
- 4 January – Tormod Skagestad, poet, novelist, playwright, actor and theatre director (b. 1920).
- 10 January – Tordis Maurstad, actress (born 1901).
- 14 January – Ebba Lodden, politician (b.1913).
- 14 January – Henny Mürer, choreographer and dancer (b. 1925).
- 18 January – Henry Hermansen, cross-country skier (b. 1921)
- 25 January – Lars Brandstrup, gallerist (b. 1913).
- 25 January – Gunnar Nygaard, broadcasting pioneer (born 1897).
- 27 January – Berte Rognerud, politician (b.1907).
- 3 February – Richard Andvord, businessman and resistance member (b. 1920)
- 9 February – Thorleif Dahl, jurist and civil servant (b. 1907)
- 10 February – Harriet Andreassen, labour activist, politician and Minister (b.1925).
- 10 February – Olaf Strand, middle-distance runner (b. 1899)
- 15 February – Frode Rinnan, architect and politician (b. 1905).
- 17 February – Lorentz Nitter, physician (b.1910).
- 3 March – Erik Waaler, professor of medicine (b. 1903).
- 9 March – Ingvard Sverdrup, politician (b.1936)
- 15 March – Kåre Holt, author (b.1916).
- 16 March – Paal Frisvold, general (b. 1908)
- 17 March – Harald Gustav Nilsen, illustrator (b. 1909).
- 19 March – Johannes Bråten, politician (b.1920)
- 21 March – Liv Andersen, politician (b.1919)
- 21 March – Elna Kimmestad, actress (b. 1918)
- 27 March – Birger Hatlebakk, industrialist and politician (b.1912)
- 28 March – Arthur Arntzen, politician (b.1906)
- 3 April – John Ugelstad, chemical engineer and inventor (b. 1921)
- 12 April – Gunnar Ellefsen, politician (b. 1930)
- 12 April – Jørgine Stene Sørensen, chemist (b. 1905)
- 13 April – Bjørn Bue, Lutheran missionary and bishop (b. 1934)
- 17 April – Folke Hauger Johannessen, admiral of the Royal Norwegian Navy (b. 1913)
- 26 April – Eigil Helland-Hansen, travel agent (b. 1910)
- 5 May – Leif Longum, essayist and literary scholar (b. 1927)
- 8 May – Clara Ottesen, economist, politician and feminist (b. 1911)
- 22 May – Nina Eik-Nes, politician (b.1900)
- 31 May – Sven Hauge, military officer (b. 1923)
- 5 June – Thor With, bishop (b. 1918)
- 6 June – Thorleif Kristensen, politician (b.1916)
- 13 June – Johan Richter, engineer, industrialist and inventor (b. 1901)
- 22 June – Lars Bergendahl, cross country skier and triple World Champion (b.1909)
- 23 June – Jenny Søyseth, politician (b. 1922)
- 1 July – Torvald Kvinlaug, politician (b. 1911)
- 16 July – Johan A. Vikan, politician (b.1912)
- 20 July – Alf Engen, skier and skiing school owner/teacher in America (b.1909)
- 26 July – Gunnvor Advocaat, painter (b. 1912)
- 2 August – Harald Kihle, painter and illustrator (b.1905).
- 6 August – Olav Grove, County Governor (born 1909).
- 16 August – Alf Malland, actor (b. 1917)
- 24 August – Randi Monsen, illustrator (b. 1910).
- 30 August – Søren H. H. Larsen, physicist (b. 1920)
- 1 September – Reidar Olsen, footballer (b. 1910)
- 10 September – Einar Jørum, footballer (b. 1924)
- 12 September – Haaken Severin Mathiesen, landowner (b. 1926)
- 14 September – Ernst Fredrik Eckhoff, judge (b.1905)
- 16 September – Liv Stubberud, politician (b.1930)
- 17 September – Jan P. Syse, lawyer and politician (b. 1930)
- 6 October – Gunnar Odd Hagen, politician (b. 1921)
- 14 October – John Qvale, police chief and judge (b. 1911)
- 20 October – Thormod Næs, sport shooter (b. 1930)
- 4 November – Erik Poppe, professor of medicine, specialist in oncology (b. 1905)
- 6 November – Anne Stine Ingstad, archaeologist (b.1918)
- 11 November – Shake Keane, jazz musician and poet (b. 1927)
- 16 November – Wilhelm Hayden, competition rower (b. 1926)
- 18 November – Fredrik Horn, footballer (b. 1916)
- 19 November – Kjell Schou-Andreassen, footballer (b. 1940)
- 20 November – Asbjørn Aavik, missionary (b. 1902)
- 22 November – Willy Evensen, rower (b. 1919)
- 23 November – Oddvar Vargset, wrestler (b. 1925)
- 23 November – Karl Valdemar Westerlund, politician (b.1907)
- 30 November – Alfred Næss, playwright and songwriter (b. 1927)
- 1 December – Eldrid Erdal, politician (b.1901)
- 5 December – Jan Voigt, actor, dancer and museum director (b. 1928)
- 15 December – Karsten Andersen, conductor (b. 1920)
- 18 December – Harriet Holter, social psychologist (b. 1922)
- 19 December – Alf Nordhus, barrister (b. 1919)
- 28 December – Roald Dysthe, businessperson (b. 1903)

=== Full date missing ===
- Trygve Bjørgo, educator and poet (b.1916)
- Per Brunsvig, barrister (b. 1917)
- Gotfred Kvifte, physicist (b.1914)
- Åse Hiorth Lervik, literary researcher (b.1933)
- Bjarne Slapgard, educator and author (b.1901)
- Jakob Sverdrup, historian (b.1919)
- Alf Tveten, sailor and Olympic silver medallist (b.1912)
