= 1916 in Norway =

- Centuries: 18th; 19th; 20th; 21st
- Decades: 1890s; 1900s; 1910s; 1920s; 1930s
- See also: List of years in Norway

Events in the year 1916 in Norway.

== Incumbents ==
- Monarch – Haakon VII.

== Events ==
- 15–16 January: The Bergen fire of 1916.
- Municipal and county elections are held throughout the country.

== Popular culture ==
=== Literature ===
- The Olav Duun novel Det gode samvite (Good Conscience) was published.

== Notable births ==
- 2 January – Joseph Grimeland, sculptor (died 2002).
- 7 January – Gunnar Jakobsen, politician (died 1992)
- 15 January – Sigrid Utkilen, politician (died 2006)
- 24 January – Erik Heiberg, sailor and Olympic silver medallist (died 1996).
- 14 February – Reidar Kvaal, military officer (died 2016).
- 15 February – Thorleif Kristensen, politician (died 1997)
- 16 February – Torgeir Andersen, politician (died 1991)
- 1 March – Arvid Hansen, resistance member, executed (died 1945)
- 13 March – Frithjof Clausen, wrestler (died 1998).
- 17 March – Hans Hjelle, politician (died 2008)
- 20 March – Magnus Andersen, politician and minister (died 1994)
- 28 March – Charles Oluf Herlofson, naval officer (died 1984).
- 8 April – Victor Borg, physician, novelist, playwright and script writer (died 1996).
- 12 April – Finn Lied, military researcher, politician and minister (died 2014)
- 29 April – Lars Korvald, politician and Prime Minister of Norway (died 2006)
- 4 May – Ole Borge, jurist and resistance member (died 1995)
- 7 May – Eigil Olaf Liane, politician (died 1994)
- 5 June – Torstein Eckhoff, civil servant and professor of law (died 1993)
- 5 June – Jan Iversen, politician (died 1999)
- 13 June – Dagfinn Mannsåker, archivist and historian (died 1994)
- 14 June – Odd Starheim, resistance fighter and SOE agent (died 1943).
- 20 June – Reidar Alveberg, bobsledder (died 2004)
- 22 June – Bjarne Kjørberg, politician (died 1969)
- 29 June – Thor Fossum, politician (died 1993)
- 17 August – Eivind Skabo, sprint canoer and Olympic bronze medallist (died 2006)
- 22 August – Ole Bergesen, politician (died 1965)
- 24 August – Sigmund P. Haave, politician (died 2001)
- 30 August – Oskar Edøy, politician (died 2008)
- 7 September – Tore Gjelsvik, geologist (died 2006).
- 12 September – Rolf Andersen, politician (died 1990)
- 18 September – Thomas Byberg, speed skater and Olympic silver medallist (died 1998)
- 24 September – Olav Gjærevoll, botanist, politician and minister (died 1994)
- 10 October – Kåre Holt, author (died 1997)
- 21 October – Ottar Grønvik, philologist and runology scholar (died 2008)
- 15 November – Greta Gynt, singer, dancer and actress (died 2000)
- 9 December – Claus Egil Feyling, politician (died 1989)
- 21 December – Knut Rumohr, painter (died 2002).

=== Full date unknown ===
- Trygve Bjørgo, educator and poet (died 1997)
- Knut Blom, judge (died 1996)
- Bjørvik Jacobsen, trapper/hunter and author (d. c2000)
- Tor Jonsson, author and journalist (died 1951)
- Sivert Andreas Nielsen, civil servant, banker and politician (died 2004)

== Notable deaths ==
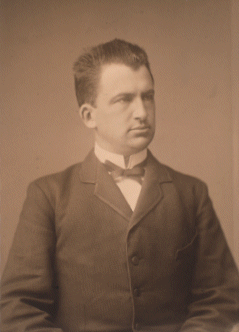
Yngvar Nielsen

- 10 April – Ole Bornemann Bull, ophthalmologist (born 1842)
- 14 April – Gina Krog, suffragist (born 1847).
- 12 September – Henrik Mohn, meteorologist (born 1835)
- 1 October – Carl Otto Løvenskiold, naval officer, politician and land owner (born 1839).

=== Full date unknown ===
- Nils Henrik Bruun, engineer (born 1832)
- Endre Johannes Cleven, settler in Canada (born 1874)
- Ole Herman Johannes Krag, gun designer (born 1837)
- Yngvar Nielsen, historian and geographer (born 1843)
- Erik V. Vullum, politician and author (born 1850)
