= 1909 in Norway =

- Centuries: 18th; 19th; 20th; 21st
- Decades: 1880s; 1890s; 1900s; 1910s; 1920s
- See also: List of years in Norway

Events in the year 1909 in Norway.

== Incumbents ==
- Monarch – Haakon VII.

== Events ==
- 27 January – The Young Left is founded
- 27 November – The Bergen Line was opened.
- The Rjukan Line is opened. The 16 km line, part of the 80 km the Tinnoset Line, connects the villages of Mæl and Rjukan in Bratsberg county. The line is operated by Norsk Hydro and its purpose is to transport fertilizer from the company's plant in Rjukan, which opened in 1911 to its shipping port at Skien. The line closed in 1991.
- The 1909 Parliamentary election takes place.

== Popular culture ==
=== Literature ===
- The Knut Hamsund novel En Vandrer spiller med Sordin (A Wanderer Plays on Muted Strings), was published.
- The Olav Duun novel På tvert (Crosswise) was published.

== Notable births ==
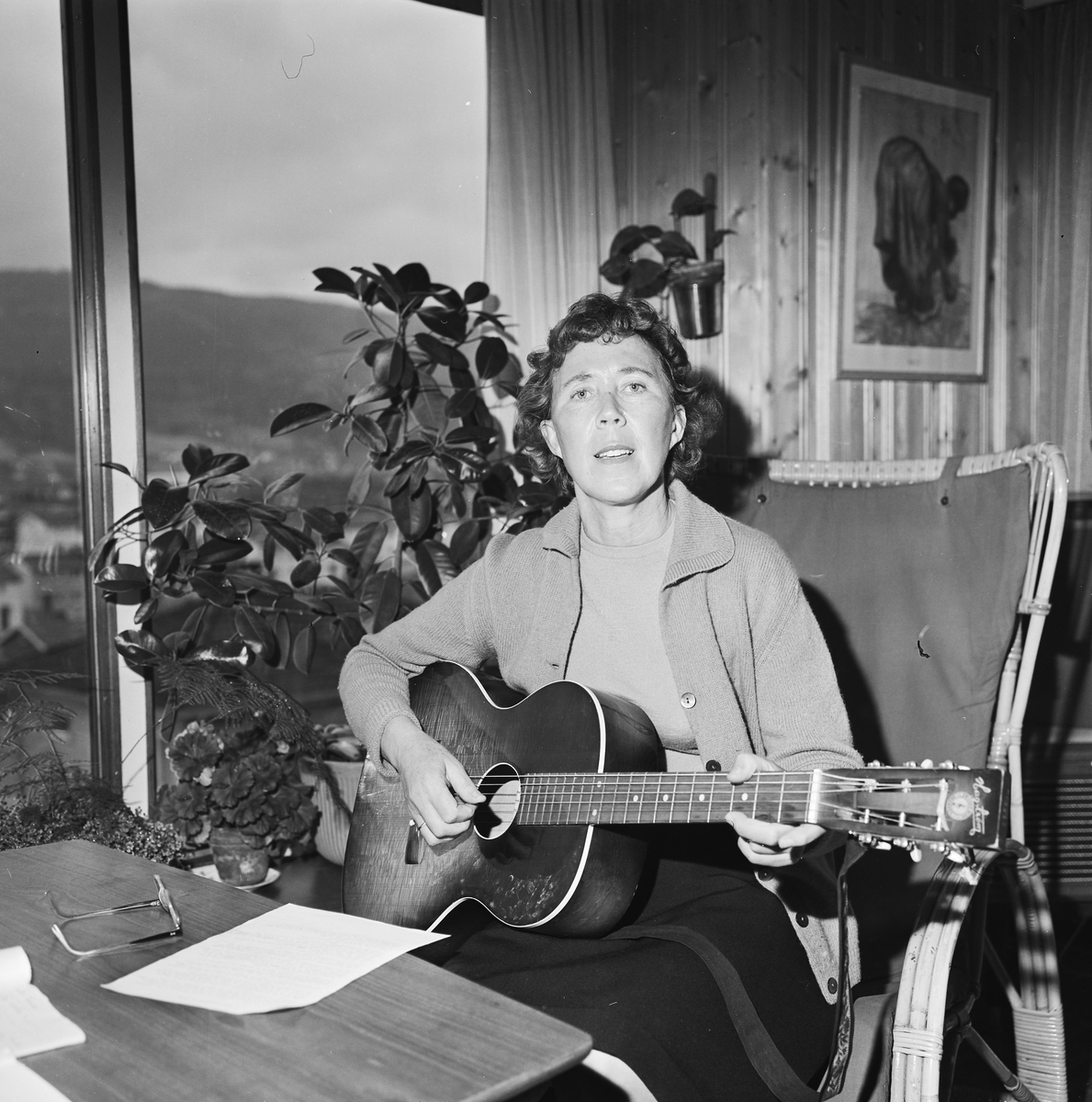
Kirsten Langbo in 1964

- 3 January – Einar Hærland, military officer, executed (died 1944)
- 15 January – Bjarne Andersen, actor, stage producer and theatre director (died 1982)
- 19 January – Einar Tommelstad, high jumper (died 1983)
- 26 January – Sverre Brodahl, Nordic skier and Olympic silver medallist (died 1998).
- 26 January – Nora Strømstad, alpine skier (died 2005)
- 30 January – Lars Bergendahl, cross-country skier and triple World Champion (died 1997)
- 26 February – Gunnar Andersen, ski jumper and World Champion (died 1988)
- 12 March – Reidar Sørlie, discus thrower (died 1969)
- 28 March – Jørgen Grave, politician (died 1988)
- 6 April – Sjur Lindebrække, banker and politician (died 1998)
- 7 April Harald Gustav Nilsen, illustrator (died 1997).
- 15 May - Alf Engen, skier and skiing school owner/teacher in America (died 1997)
- 18 May - Peter Kjeldseth Moe, politician (died 1973)
- 31 May – Thor Thorvaldsen, sailor and twice Olympic gold medallist (died 1987).
- 26 June – Benny Motzfeldt, visual artist, glass designer and sculptor (died 1995).
- 27 June – Tord Godal, bishop (died 2002).
- 28 June – Alf Hellevik, philologist (died 2001).
- 7 July – Arne Larsen, cross-country skier
- 17 July – Knut Fægri, botanist (died 2001)
- 18 July – Arnljot Karstein Eidnes, politician (died 1990)
- 17 August – Olaf Barda, chess player, first Norwegian International Master (died 1971)
- 13 September – Kirsten Langbo, children's writer, singer-songwriter, radio entertainer and puppeteer (died 1996).
- 23 September – Hans Offerdal, politician (died 1980)
- 23 September – Salve Andreas Salvesen, politician (died 1975)
- 25 September – Leif Granli, politician and Minister (died 1988)
- 19 October – Olav Moen, politician (died 1995)
- 24 October – Tor Gjesdal, journalist and civil servant (died 1973).
- 27 October – Kjell Moe, international footballer (died 1999).
- 1 November – Johannes Sandven, educator (died 2000).
- 9 November – Oscar Gjøslien, cross-country skier
- 16 November – Kristian Kristiansen, novelist, playwright, short story and children's writer (died 1980)
- 3 December – Arne Thomas Olsen, actor, stage producer and theatre director (died 2000)
- 8 December – Nils Andreas Sørensen, chemist (died 1987).
- 12 December – Asbjørn Sunde, sailor, saboteur and spy (died 1985).
- 15 December – Randi Heide Steen, soprano singer (died 1990).
- 18 December – Johan Skipnes, politician (died 2005)

=== Full date missing ===
- Erling Anger, civil servant (died 1999)
- Christian Astrup, economist and politician for Nasjonal Samling (died 1983).
- Dag Ramsøy Bryn, diplomat and politician (died 1991)
- Paul Lorck Eidem, writer and illustrator (died 1992)
- Rolf Jørgen Fuglesang, politician and Minister (died 1988)
- Hans Christian Henriksen, businessperson (died 1983)

== Notable deaths ==
- 27 March – Knud Graah, industrial pioneer (born 1817).
- 28 March – Hans Henrik Wærenskjold, politician (born 1820)
- 9 July – Vilhelm Andreas Wexelsen, bishop and politician (born 1849)
- 31 July – Olaf Wilhelm Petersen, military officer and sports official (born 1841).
- 21 November – Peder Severin Krøyer, painter (born 1851)
- 23 November – Otto Sinding, painter (born 1842)
- 30 November – Elise Aubert, novelist, short-story writer, and non-fiction writer (born 1837).

=== Full date unknown ===
- Albert Marius Jacobsen, military officer and politician (born 1838)
- Bøicke Johan Rulffs Koren, politician and Minister (born 1828)
- Thorvald Meyer, businessperson (born 1818)
