= 1901 in Norway =

- Centuries: 18th; 19th; 20th; 21st
- Decades: 1880s; 1890s; 1900s; 1910s; 1920s
- See also: 1901 in Sweden; List of years in Norway

Events in the year 1901 in Norway.

== Incumbents ==
- Monarch: Oscar II.
- Prime Minister: Johannes Steen

== Events ==
- 12 August – 2/3 of the town of Farsund burns down.
- The Temperance Party was founded.

== Births ==
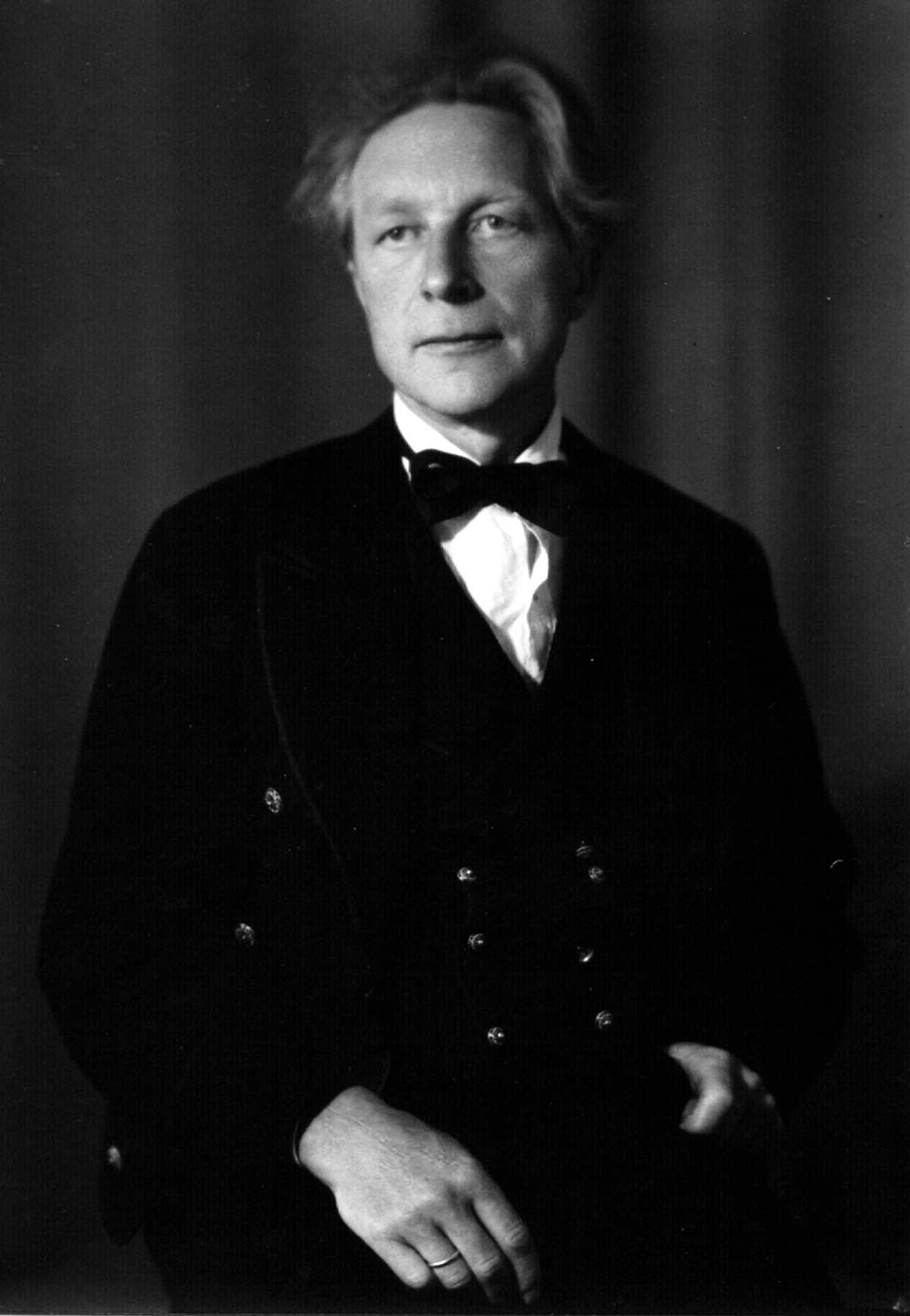
Eivind Groven

=== January to March ===
- 9 January – Bjarne Lyngstad, politician and Minister (died 1971)
- 16 January – Narve Bonna, ski jumper and Olympic silver medallist (died 1976)
- 16 January – Hans Karolus Ommedal, politician (died 1984)
- 26 January – Alf Konningen, alpine skier (died 1978)
- 30 January – Eldrid Erdal, politician (died 1997)
- 21 February – Tore Foss, singer, actor and theatre director (died 1968).
- 11 March – Kjell Bondevik, politician and Minister (died 1983)
- 17 March – Arnt Njargel, politician (died 1985)
- 25 March – Harry Lundeberg, merchant seaman and labour leader in America (died 1957)

=== April to June ===
- 10 April – Tønnes Oksefjell, politician (died 1976)
- 23 April – Tore Segelcke, actress (died 1979)
- 1 May – Jentoft Jensen, politician (died 1953)
- 3 May – Kjell Gjøstein Aabrek, politician (died 1967)
- 8 May – Ingrid Bjerkås, first female minister in the Church of Norway (died 1980)
- 11 May – Axel Strøm, physician (died 1985).
- 18 May – Sigrun Berg, weaver and textile designer (died 1982).
- 23 May – Kristoffer Nilsen, boxer (died 1975)
- 4 June – Kolbjørn Fjeld, librarian and publisher (died 1978).
- 7 June – Nils Ebbessøn Astrup, ship owner (died 1972).
- 19 June – Øyvinn Øi, military officer (died 1940)

=== July to September ===
- 8 July – Sigurd Lersbryggen, politician (died 1980)
- 9 July – Jørgen Mathiesen, landowner and businessperson (died 1993)
- 14 July – Hårek Ludvig Hansen, politician (died 1996)
- 14 July – Haakon Sløgedal, politician (died 1979)
- 17 July – Finn Berstad, international soccer player (died 1982)
- 6 August – Anders Sæterøy, politician (died 1991)
- 10 August – Hjalmar Olai Storeide, politician (died 1961)
- 14 August – Håkon Bryhn, sailor and Olympic gold medallist (died 1968)
- 16 August – Olav Kielland, composer and conductor (died 1985)
- 27 August – Liv Tomter, politician (died 1978)
- 31 August – Helge Jakobsen, politician (died 1996)
- 5 September – Erling Dekke Næss, shipowner and businessman (died 1993)
- 6 September – Henrik Friis Robberstad, politician (died 1978)
- 11 September – Torkell Tande, politician (died 2001)
- 22 September – Brynhild Berge, diver (died 1975)

=== October to December ===
- 1 October – Arne Torolf Strøm, politician (died 1972)
- 2 October – Egil Halmøy, politician (died 1984)
- 4 October – Egil Werner Erichsen, politician (died 2000)
- 6 October – Aslak Brekke, folksinger (died 1978)
- 8 October – Eivind Groven, composer and music-theorist (died 1977)
- 2 November – Erling Østerberg, police officer (died 1981).
- 18 November – Einar Nilsen, boxer (died 1980)
- 24 November – Reidar Ødegaard, cross country skier and Olympic bronze medallist (died 1972)
- 4 December – Julla Sæthern, barrister, feminist, politician (died 1981).
- 6 December – Odd Nansen, architect, author and humanitarian (died 1973)
- 24 December – Tordis Maurstad, actress (died 1997).
- 26 December – Olav Hordvik, politician (died 1979)
- 31 December – John Schjelderup Giæver, author and polar researcher (died 1970)

=== Full date unknown ===
- Per Arneberg, poet, prosaist and translator (died 1981)
- Erik Kristen-Johanssen, jurist and theatre director (died 1976)
- Gulbrand Lunde, politician (died 1942)
- Rudolf Nilsen, poet and journalist (died 1929)
- Bjarne Slapgard, educator and author (died 1997)
- Solveig Haugan, stage and movie actress (died 1953)

== Deaths ==
- 31 January – Peter Andreas Blix, architect and engineer (born 1831)
- 9 May – Andreas Leigh Aabel, physician and poet (born 1830)
- 3 July – Lorenz Juhl Vogt, politician (born 1825)

=== Full date unknown ===
- Ole Peter Petersen, founder of Methodism in Norway and co-founder of Norwegian and Danish Methodism in the United States (born 1822)
