= 1995 in Norway =

- Centuries: 18th; 19th; 20th; 21st
- Decades: 1970s; 1980s; 1990s; 2000s; 2010s
- See also: List of years in Norway

Events in the year 1995 in Norway.

== Incumbents ==
- Monarch – Harald V.
- Prime Minister – Gro Harlem Brundtland (Labour Party)

== Events ==
- 1 January – The Draupner wave in the North Sea in Norway is detected, confirming the existence of rogue waves.
- 6 March – Brønnøysunds Avis launches the first online newspaper in Norway.

=== Full date unknown ===
- Norsk Hydro merges its gas stations in Norway and Denmark with the Texaco, creating the joint venture HydroTexaco. The service station chain is sold in 2006 to Reitangruppen.
- Municipal and county elections are held throughout the country.

== Anniversaries ==
- 21 January – 150 years since the birth of Harriet Backer
- 6 March – 100 years since the death of Camilla Collett.
- 12 July – 100 years since the birth of Kirsten Flagstad

== Popular culture ==
=== Sports ===
- 4–5 February – The FIL World Luge Championships 1995 took place at Hunderfossen.
- 1–5 March – The 1995 World Skeleton Championships and the 1995 World Junior Bobsleigh Championships took place at Hunderfossen.
- 17–19 March – The 1995 World Short Track Speed Skating Championships took place in the Olympic Cavern Hall, Gjøvik.
- March – The World Junior Alpine Skiing Championships 1995 took place in Voss Municipality.

=== Music ===
- 13 May – Norway wins the Eurovision Song Contest 1995 with the song "Nocturne", performed by Secret Garden.

== Notable births ==
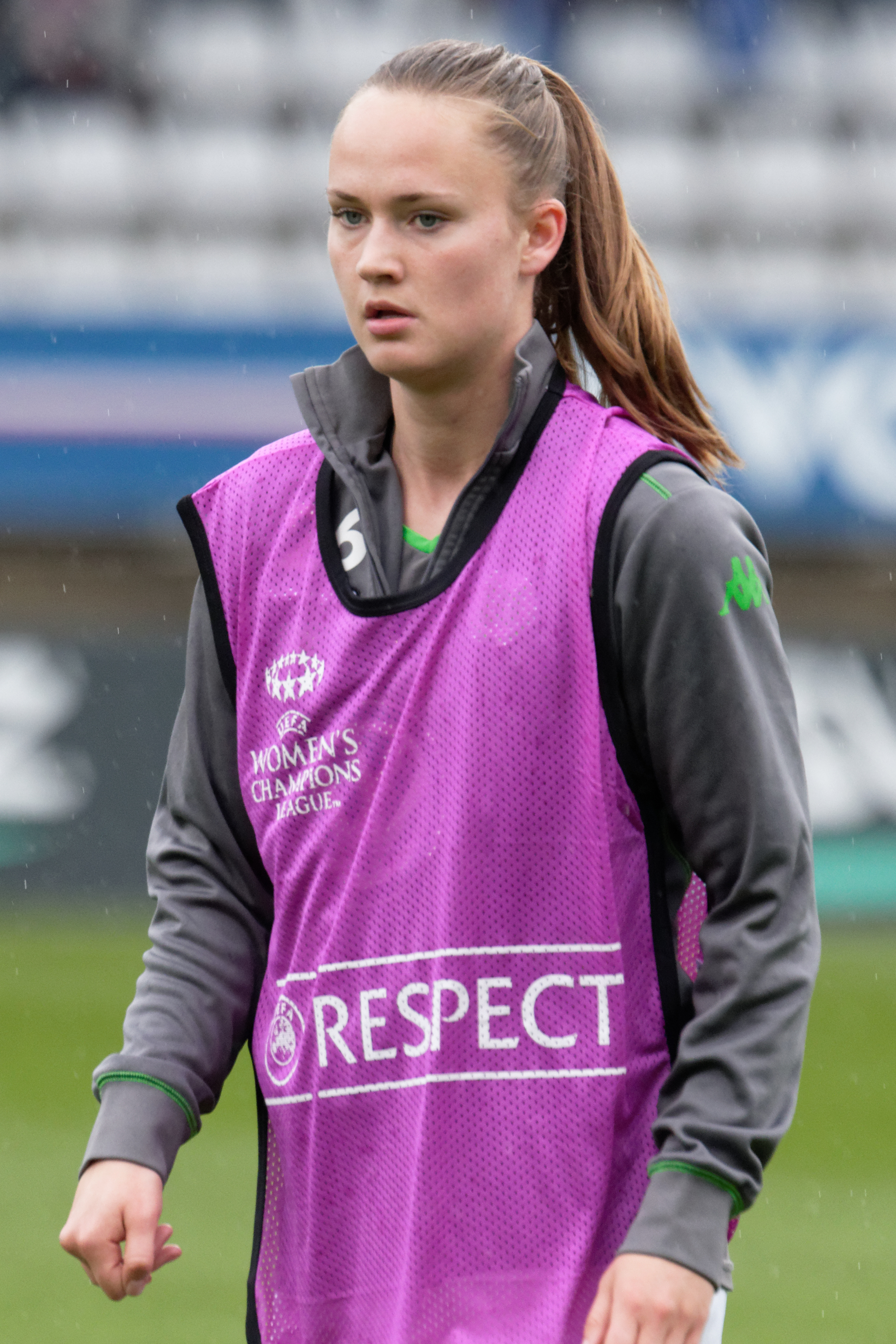
Caroline Graham Hansen

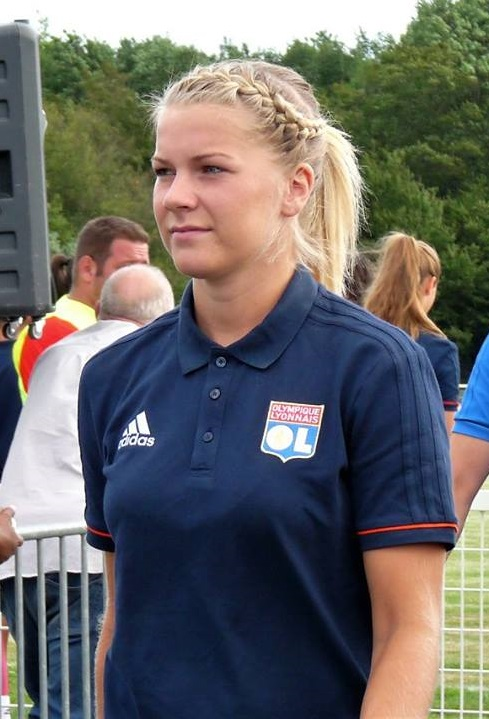
Ada Hegerberg

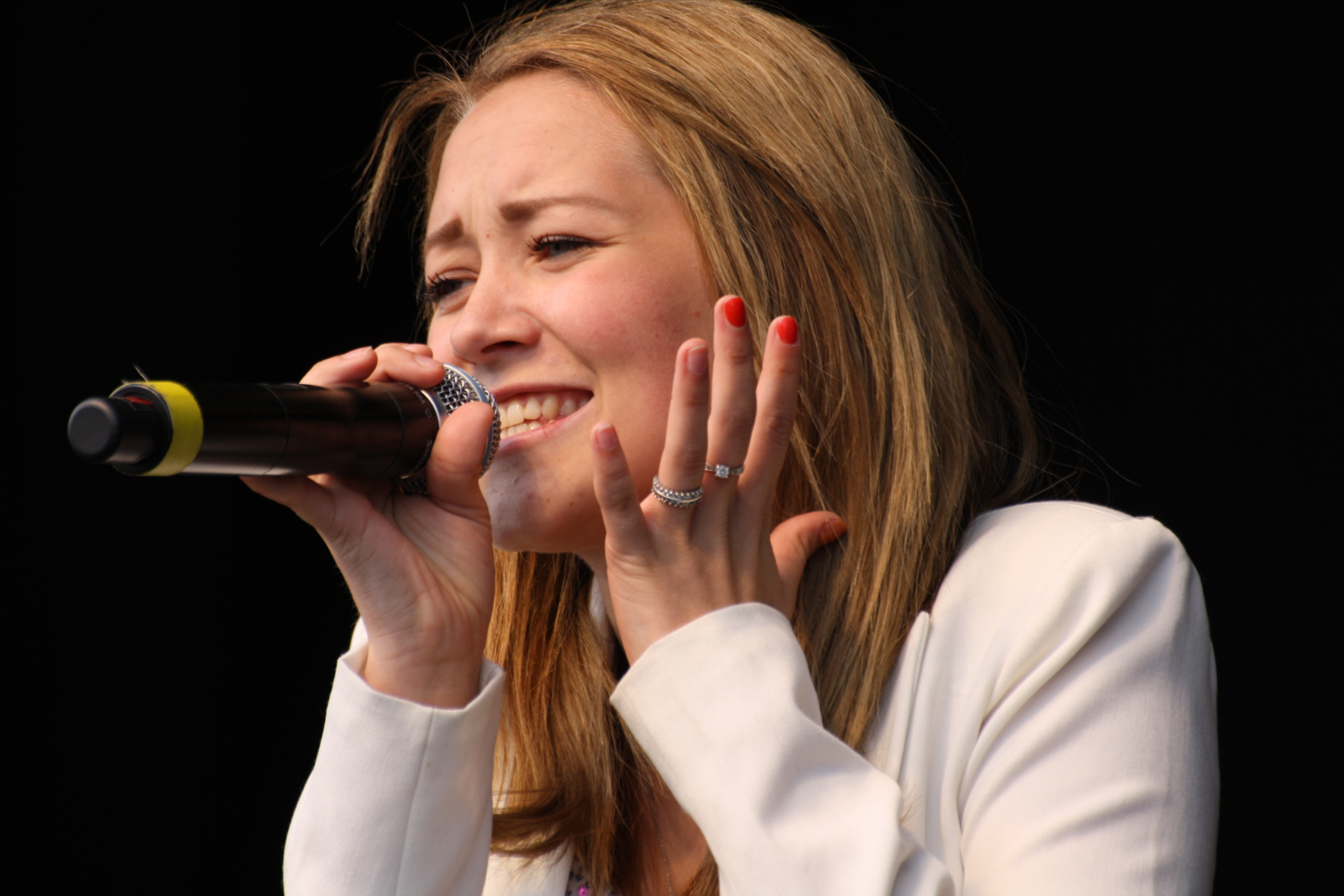
Malin Reitan

- 4 January – Astrid Hoem, politician.
- 23 January – Marius Høibråten, footballer
- 5 February – Thomas Martinussen, footballer
- 12 February – Kent-Are Antonsen, footballer
- 13 February – Bård Finne, footballer
- 18 February – Caroline Graham Hansen, footballer
- 2 March – Mats Møller Dæhli, footballer
- 30 March – Anders Trondsen, footballer
- 7 April – Tiril Sjåstad Christiansen, freestyle skier.
- 4 May – Martin Ellingsen, footballer.
- 3 June – Mattias Nørstebø, ice hockey player
- 26 June – Eirik Hestad, footballer.
- 26 June – Simen Nordermoen, footballer
- 7 July – Even Eriksen, politician.
- 10 July – Ada Hegerberg, footballer
- 18 July – Kristian Eriksen, footballer
- 3 August – Jeppe Moe, footballer.
- 8 August – Malin Reitan, singer
- 26 August
  - Amalie Eikeland, footballer.
  - Herman Stengel, footballer
  - Sondre Tronstad, footballer
- 31 August – Celine Helgemo, singer and songwriter
- 10 November – Line Høst, competitive sailor.
- 25 November – Anja Ninasdotter Abusland, politician.

=== Full date unknown ===
- Andrine Benjaminsen, orienteer and ski orienteer.
- Sebastian Warholm, actor

== Notable deaths ==
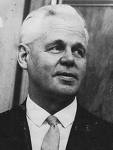
Torrey Mosvold

- 6 February – Bjarne Henry Henriksen, politician (born 1904)
- 15 February – Frieda Dalen, educator (born 1895).
- 26 February – Kjell Thorbjørn Kristensen, politician (born 1927)
- 28 February – Ragnvald Mikal Andersen, politician (born 1899)
- 31 March – Wilfred Aanerud, pop singer (born 1924).
- 13 April – Peter Bastiansen, businessperson and politician (born 1912).
- 4 May – Arne Arnardo, circus performer and owner (born 1912).
- 16 May – Parelius Hjalmar Bang Berntsen, politician (born 1910)
- 24 May – Ole Borge, jurist and resistance member (born 1916)
- 26 May – Sigmund Skard, poet, essayist and professor of literature (born 1903)
- 30 May – Sunniva Hakestad Møller, politician (born 1907)
- 31 May – Ingrid Semmingsen, historian, first female professor of history in Norway (born 1910)
- 5 June – Olav Moen, politician (born 1909)
- 30 July – Pelle Christensen, actor and translator (born 1923)
- 28 September – Ottar Fjærvoll, politician (born 1914)
- 17 October – Gunvor Hofmo, writer and poet (born 1921)
- 18 October – Torrey Mosvold, shipping and industrial entrepreneur (born 1910)
- 7 November – Halvor Thorbjørn Hjertvik, politician (born 1914)
- 10 November – Tormod Førland, chemist (born 1920).
- 24 November – Benny Motzfeldt, visual artist, glass designer and sculptor (born 1909).
- 25 November – Leif Juster, comedian, singer and actor (born 1910).
- 26 November – Sigmund Mjelve, writer (born 1926).
- 3 December – Hans Aardal, politician (born 1921)
- 7 December – Benn John Valsø, bobsledder (born 1927)
- 16 December – Inger Waage, industrial ceramicist (born 1923).

=== Full date unknown ===
- Otto Chr. Bastiansen, physicist and chemist (born 1918)
