= 1913 in Norway =

- Centuries: 18th; 19th; 20th; 21st
- Decades: 1890s; 1900s; 1910s; 1920s; 1930s
- See also: List of years in Norway

Events in the year 1913 in Norway.

== Incumbents ==
- Monarch – Haakon VII.
- Prime Minister – Jens Bratlie (until 31 January), then Gunnar Knudsen (from 31 January)

== Events ==
- 11 June - Female suffrage is enacted in Norway.
- Municipal and county elections are held throughout the country.
- The town of Notodden is founded.

== Popular culture ==
=== Sports ===
- 29 July – Vålerengens IF was founded.

=== Literature ===
- The Knut Hamsund novel Børn av Tiden (Children of the Age), was published.
- The Olav Duun novel Sigyn, Sommareventyr was published.

=== Arts ===
- 5 October – Det Norske Teatret's first play.

== Notable births ==
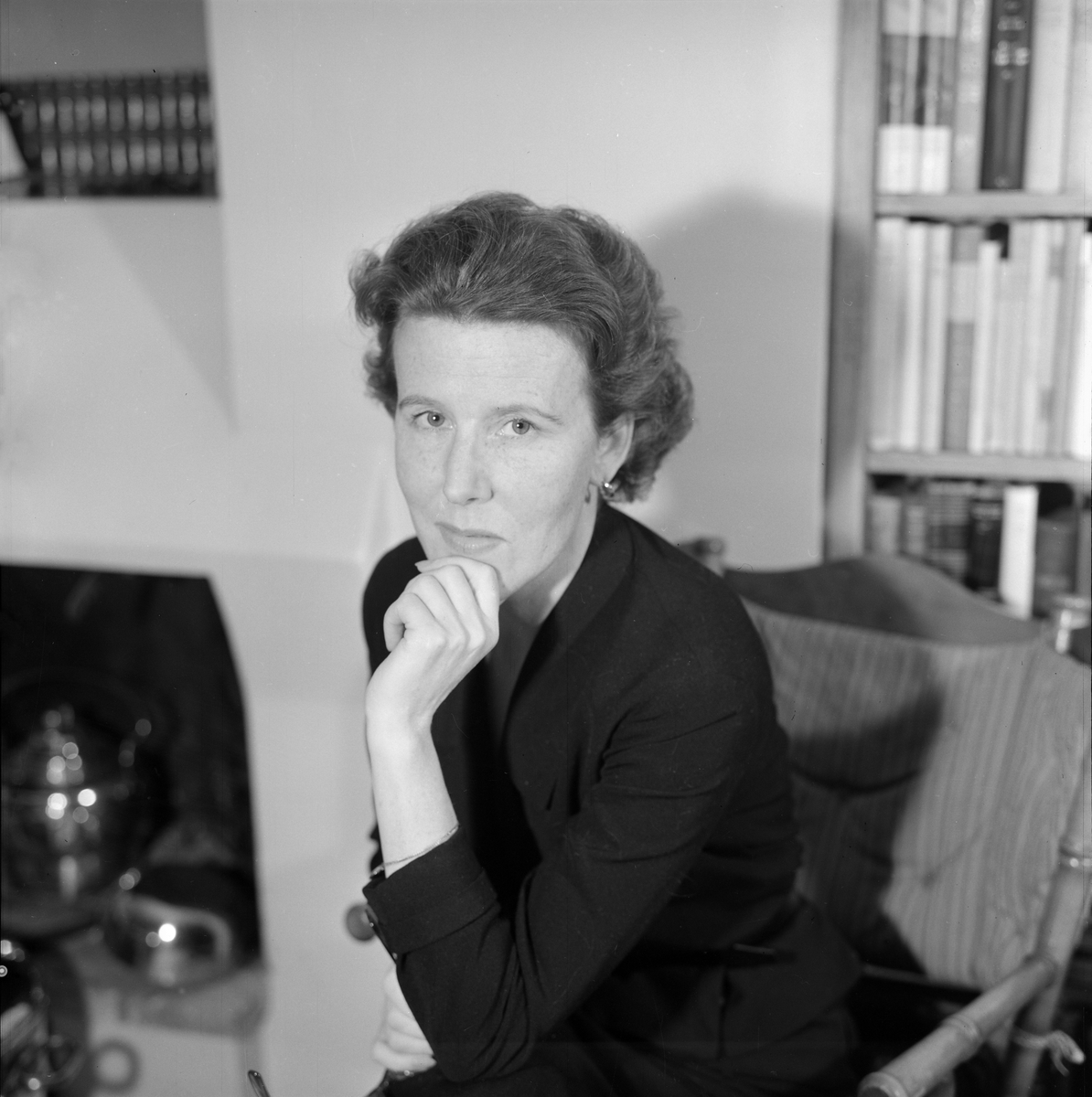
Gerd Nyquist

- 13 January – Karl J. Brommeland, politician (died 1999)
- 20 January – Odd Frantzen, soccer player and Olympic bronze medallist (died 1977)
- 11 February – Margrete Aamot Øverland, resistance member (died 1978)
- 20 February – Johan Støa, politician (died 1973)
- 23 February – Gunnar Fredrik Hellesen, politician (died 2005)
- 24 February – Kai Holst, resistance fighter (died 1945)
- 10 March – Anna Sofie Herland, politician (died 1990)
- 13 March – Harald Magne Elstad, judge (died 2003)
- 15 March – Gerd Nyquist, novelist (died 1984)
- 17 March – Olaf Trampe Kindt, barrister (died 1995)
- 1 April – Peder Ree Pedersen, politician (died 1976)
- 3 April – Per Borten, Prime Minister of Norway (died 2005)
- 10 April – Ragnar Horn, politician (died 2002)
- 19 April – Edvard Kaurin Barth, resistance member and zoologist (died 1996)
- 21 April – Arne Sæter, politician (died 1973)
- 25 April – Harald Noreng, literary researcher and lexicographer (died 2006)
- 1 May – Sigurd Valvatne, naval officer (died 2004).
- 11 May – Wilhelm Münter Rolfsen, lawyer.
- 12 May – Harry Johan Olai Klippenvåg, politician (died 1994)
- 12 May – Reidar Strømdahl, politician (died 2006)
- 22 May – Karsten Buer, harness racing coach (died 1993)
- 12 June – Helge Sivertsen, discus thrower, politician (died 1986)
- 23 June – Sverre Hansen, international soccer player and Olympic bronze medallist (died 1974)
- 14 July – Kåre Martin Hansen, politician (died 1985)
- 27 August – John Larsen, rifle shooter, Olympic gold medallist and World Champion (died 1989)
- 17 September – Jarl Johnsen, boxer (died 1986)
- 27 September – Petter Jakob Bjerve, politician (died 2004)
- 1 October – Otto Øgrim, physicist and author (died 2006)
- 2 October – Alf Sanengen, resistance member, chemist, research administrator (died 1991)
- 18 October – Arne Skouen, film director and journalist (died 2003)
- 23 October – Odd Eidem, writer, journalist and literary critic (died 1988)
- 22 November – Olav Bruvik, politician (died 1962)
- 1 December – Gerd Benneche, jurist and journalist (died 2003).
- 2 December – Knut Myrstad, politician (died 2001)
- 25 December – Arvid Nilssen, actor, revue artist and singer (died 1976)

=== Full date unknown ===
- Arne B. Mollén, sports official (died 2000)

== Notable deaths ==
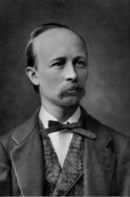
Evald Rygh

- 9 January – Hjalmar Johansen, polar explorer (born 1867)
- 27 January – Robert Collett, zoologist (born 1842)
- 8 February – Thore Torkildsen Foss, politician (born 1841)
- 28 February – Dikken Zwilgmeyer, writer (born 1853).
- 13 March – Thomas Krag, writer (born 1868).
- 9 May – Evald Rygh, banker, politician (born 1842)
- 10 May – Andreas Aubert, art historian (born 1851)
- 1 June – Anne Bolette Holsen, teacher and proponent for women's rights (born (1856).
- 5 July – Johannes Christiansen, politician (born 1850)
- 15 July – Thomas Vigner Christiansen Haaland, politician (born 1859)
- 26 July – Wilhelm Christopher Christophersen, diplomat (born 1832)
- 13 August – Carl Willoch Ludvig Horn, educator, textbook writer and politician (born 1841).
- 10 September – Haaken C. Mathiesen, landowner and businessperson (born 1827)
- 23 October – Kristian Vilhelm Koren Schjelderup, Sr., bishop (born 1853)

=== Full date unknown ===
- Anton Christian Bang, politician (born 1840)
- Fritz Trampe Flood, merchant (born 1826)
- Anna Sofie Jakobsen, missionary to China (born 1860)
- Birger Kildal, politician (born 1849)
- Theodor Løvstad, musician, magazine editor (born 1843).
- Kristian Mauritz Mustad, politician (born 1848)
