= 1985 in Norway =

- Centuries: 18th; 19th; 20th; 21st
- Decades: 1960s; 1970s; 1980s; 1990s; 2000s
- See also: List of years in Norway

Events in the year 1985 in Norway.

== Incumbents ==
- Monarch – Olav V.
- Prime Minister – Kåre Willoch (Conservative Party)

== Events ==
- 25 February – The trial of the accused spy Arne Treholt starts.
- April-The first Norwegians to summit Mount Everest reached the top
- 20 June – Arne Treholt was sentenced to 20 years in prison for espionage.
- 9 September – The 1985 Parliamentary election takes place.
- 3 December – The Rock carvings at Alta, Norway's only prehistoric World Heritage Site, is designated by UNESCO as a World Heritage Site.
- The volcano Beerenberg on the Norwegian volcanic island Jan Mayen erupts.

== Popular culture ==
=== Sports ===
- 27 July – Ingrid Kristiansen breaks the previous world record in the 10,000 metres at Bislett stadion, recording a time of 30:59.42 minutes.

=== Music ===
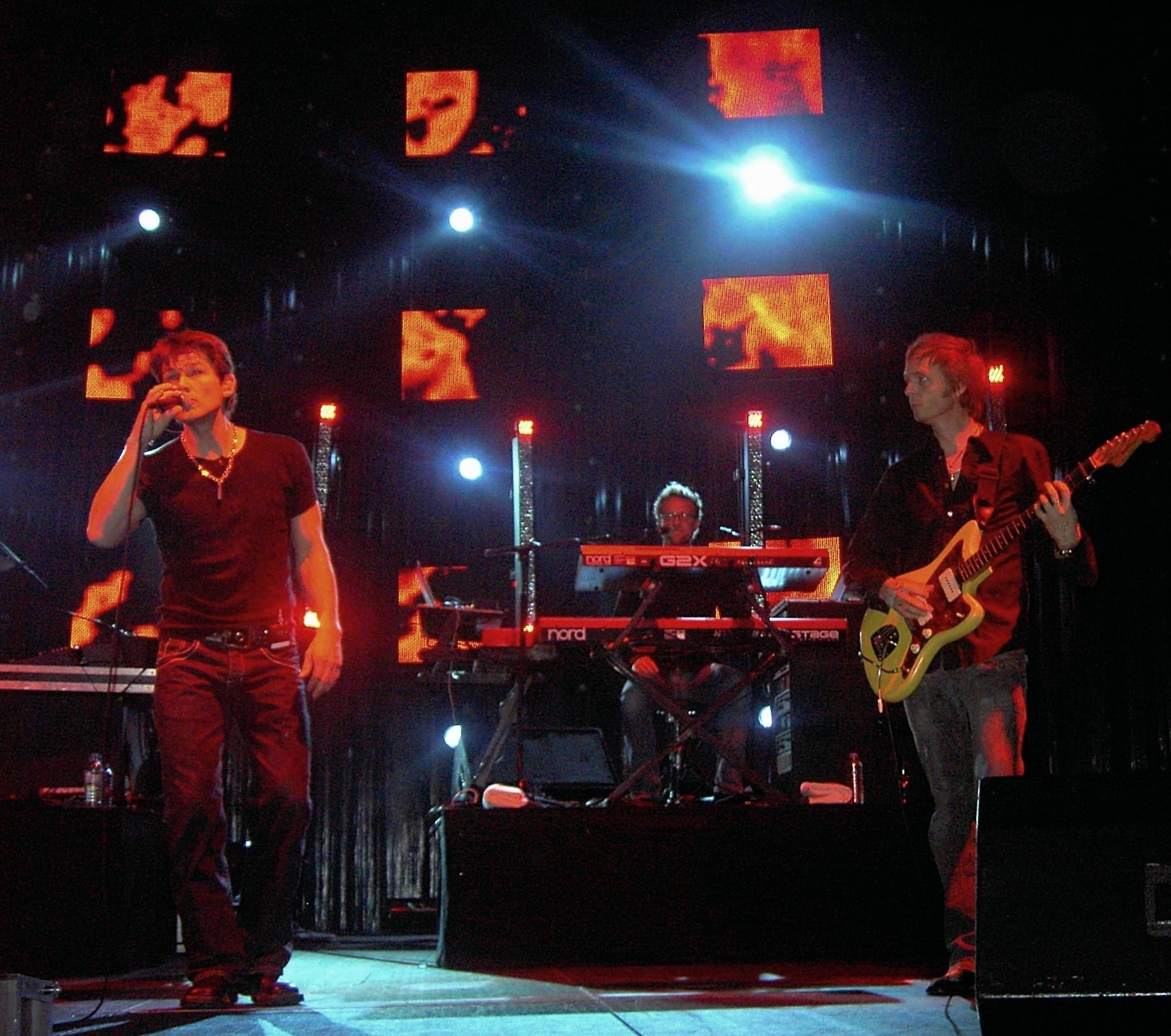
A-ha in concert in 2005

- 4 May – With the song "La det swinge" ("Let it swing"), Norway's Norwegian pop duo Bobbysocks! wins Eurovision Song Contest 1985.
- 16 September – Norwegian Pop band A-ha releases a new version of their single Take On Me, which debuted last year, featuring a cartoon music video of a motor race; within weeks it is a number one hit worldwide in countries including the United Kingdom and the United States of America.

=== Literature ===
- Fredrik Skagen, writer, is awarded the Norwegian Booksellers' Prize.
- Harald Sverdrup, poet and children's writer, is awarded the Riksmål Society Literature Prize.

== Notable births ==
=== January ===
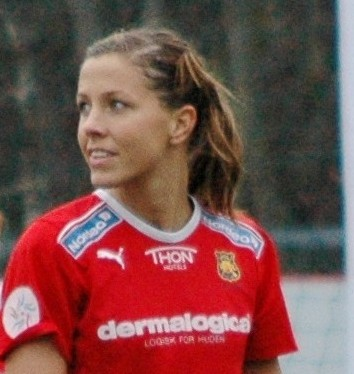
Guro Knutsen Mienna

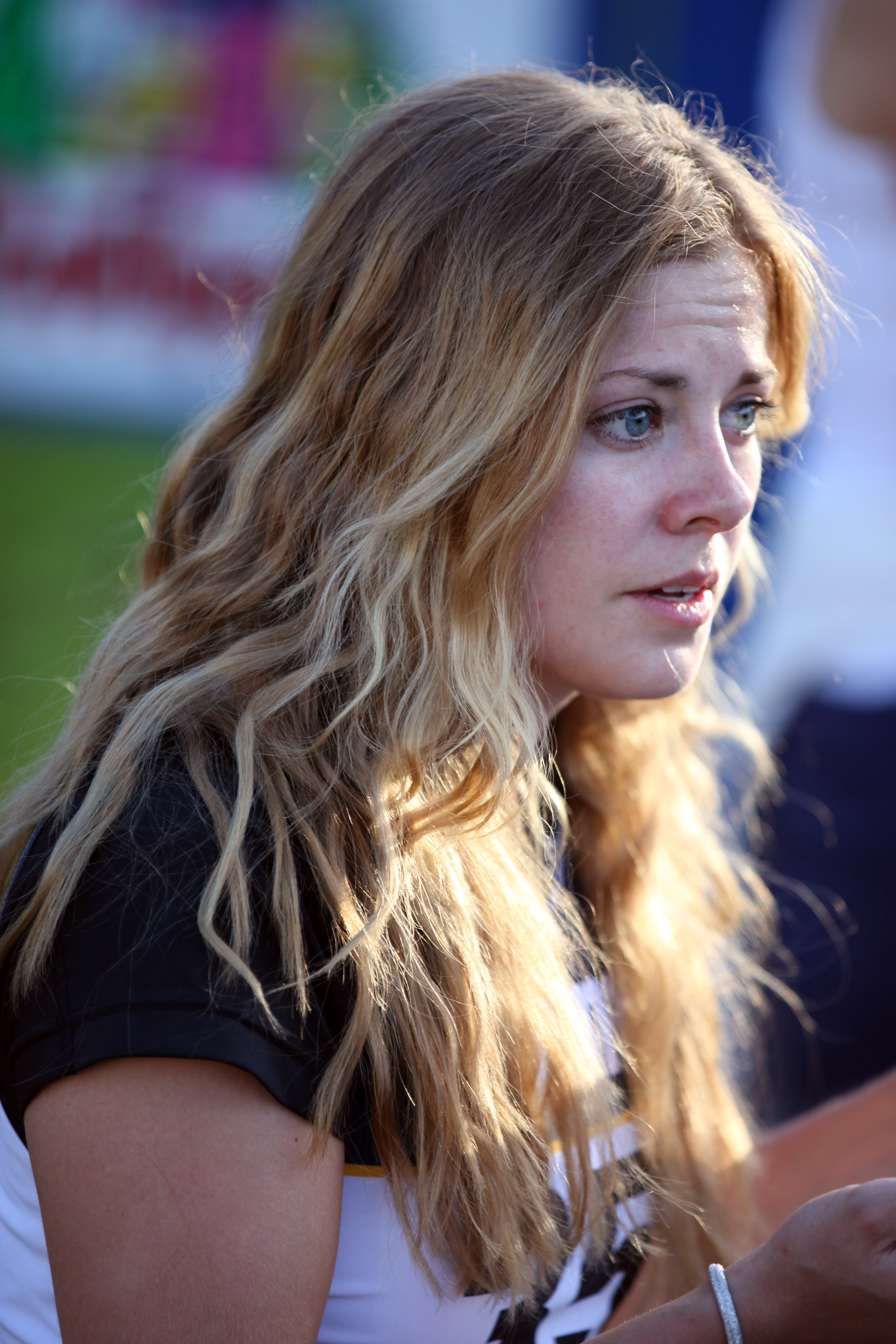
Anette Sagen

- 2 January – André Roligheten, jazz musician and composer
- 4 January – Kari Aalvik Grimsbø, handball player.
- 10 January – Gabrielle Leithaug, electropop singer
- 10 January – Guro Knutsen Mienna, footballer
- 10 January – Anette Sagen, ski jumper
- 13 January – Leif Otto Paulsen, footballer
- 13 January – Kari Vikhagen Gjeitnes, cross-country skier
- 20 January – André Danielsen, footballer
- 29 January – Jon Rune Strøm, jazz musician

=== February ===
- 1 February – Mounir Hamoud, footballer
- 2 February – Kristian Skogsrud, footballer
- 15 February – Gøril Snorroeggen, handball player
- 17 February – Anders Jacobsen, ski jumper
- 18 February – Ine Marie Wilmann, actress.
- 19 February – Kristoffer Lo, jazz musician
- 22 February – Iven Austbø, football goalkeeper
- 25 February – Thomas Borge Lie, freestyle skier
- 28 February – Åsmund Grøver Aukrust, politician

=== March ===
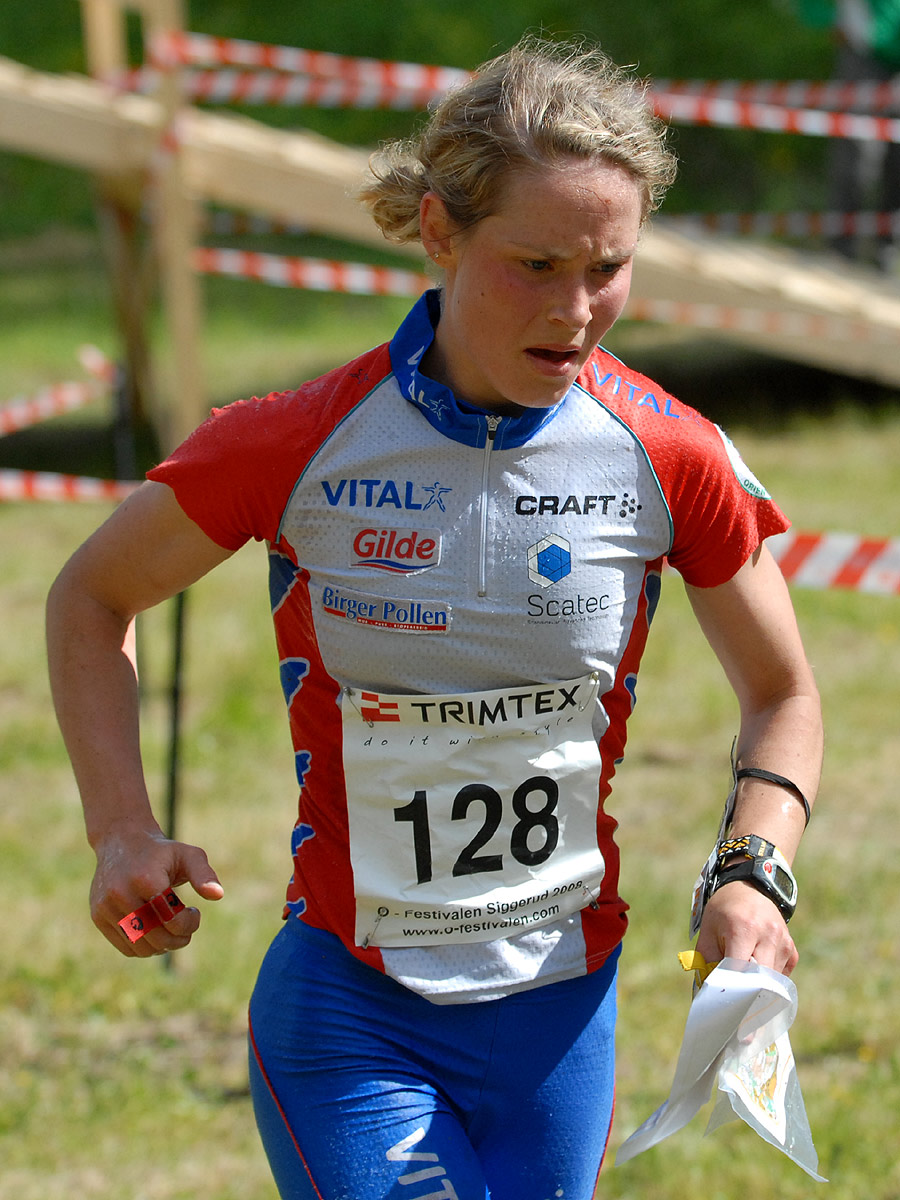
Mari Fasting

- 1 March – Mari Fasting, orienteering competitor and ski mountaineer
- 2 March – Torstein Tvedt Solberg, politician
- 3 March – Maren Haugli, speed skater
- 6 March – Olav Dalen, footballer
- 10 March – Mikko Kokslien, Nordic combined skier
- 19 March – Christine Guldbrandsen, singer
- 21 March – Margrethe Renstrøm, long jumper
- 22 March – Jonas Johansen, footballer

=== April ===
- 2 April – Lars Erik Spets, ice hockey player
- 3 April – June Pedersen, footballer
- 10 April – Margrethe Haarr, politician.
- 12 April – Siri Nilsen, singer-songwriter
- 16 April – Ingeborg Gjærum, environmentalist

=== May ===
- 7 May – Tonje Nøstvold, handball player.
- 7 May – Espen Næss Lund, footballer
- 12 May – Elise Egseth, orienteering competitor
- 14 May – Tore Sandbakken, jazz musician
- 15 May – Knut Gravråk, politician
- 19 May – Arve Walde, footballer
- 21 May – Alexander Dale Oen, swimmer (died 2012)
- 25 May – Børre Steenslid, footballer
- 29 May – Benjamin Hermansen, murder victim (died 2001)

=== June ===
- 1 June – Johnny Lodden, poker player
- 1 June – Kjell Ingolf Ropstad, politician
- 2 June – Bjørnar Holmvik, footballer
- 3 June – Mohammad Usman Rana, columnist
- 3 June – Steffen Thoresen, ice hockey player
- 4 June – Oddvar Reiakvam, politician
- 13 June – Ida Alstad, handball player.
- 13 June – Elisabeth Carew, singer and songwriter
- 17 June – Espen Christensen, handball player
- 20 June – Ellen Brekken, jazz musician
- 28 June – Inga Berit Svestad, handball player.

=== July ===
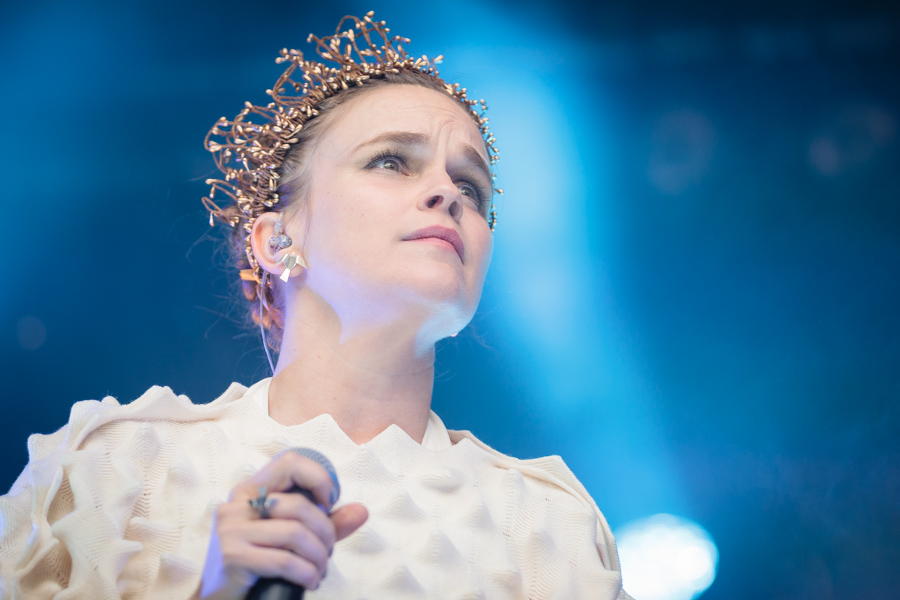
Gunnhild Sundli

- 2 July – Gunnhild Sundli, singer and actor
- 12 July – Emil Hegle Svendsen, biathlete
- 17 July – Henning Hauger, footballer
- 17 July – Knut Olav Rindarøy, footballer
- 23 July – Kristian Ruth, sailor
- 25 July – Anneli Giske, footballer
- 30 July – Daniel Fredheim Holm, footballer

=== August ===
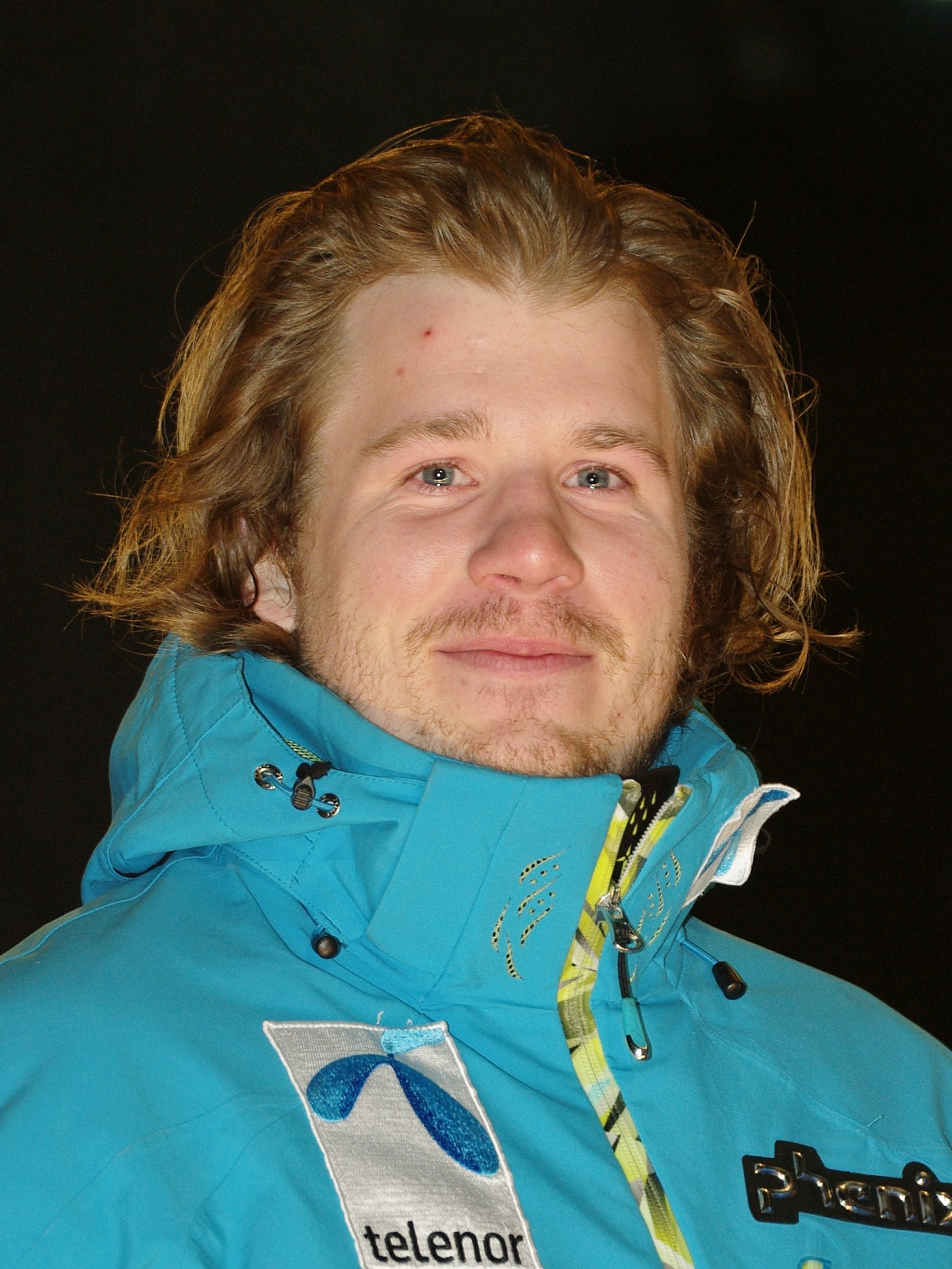
Kjetil Jansrud

- 1 August – Caroline "Dina" Kongerud, musician
- 10 August – Ørjan Johannessen, chef
- 11 August – Hildegunn Gjertrud Hovdenak, cyclist
- 12 August – Kirby Ann Basken, model
- 15 August – Carina Dahl, pop singer and songwriter
- 22 August – Kim Johannesen, jazz musician
- 25 August – Kenneth Sola, footballer
- 28 August – Kjetil Jansrud, alpine skier.

=== September ===
- 13 September – Fredrik Nordkvelle, footballer
- 15 September – Iselin Steiro, model
- 16 September – Johan Remen Evensen, ski jumper

=== October ===
- 2 October – Ole Marius Ingvaldsen, ski jumper
- 5 October – Per Martin Sandtrøen, politician.
- 11 October – Margaret Berger, electropop singer and songwriter
- 11 October – Øyvind Gram, footballer
- 15 October – Øystein Skar, pianist and composer
- 23 October – Mohammed Abdellaoue, footballer

=== November ===
- 7 November – Kent Ove Clausen, cross-country skier
- 14 November – Øivind Wilhelmsen, physical chemistry professor
- 18 November – Alexander Gabrielsen, footballer
- 25 November – Marit Malm Frafjord, handball player.

=== December ===
- 1 December – Petter Eliassen, cross country skier
- 4 December – Linni Meister, glamour model
- 11 December – Sigurd Kvammen Rafaelsen, politician.
- 19 December – Ine Hoem, jazz singer
- 30 December – Marie Sneve Martinussen, politician.

== Notable deaths ==
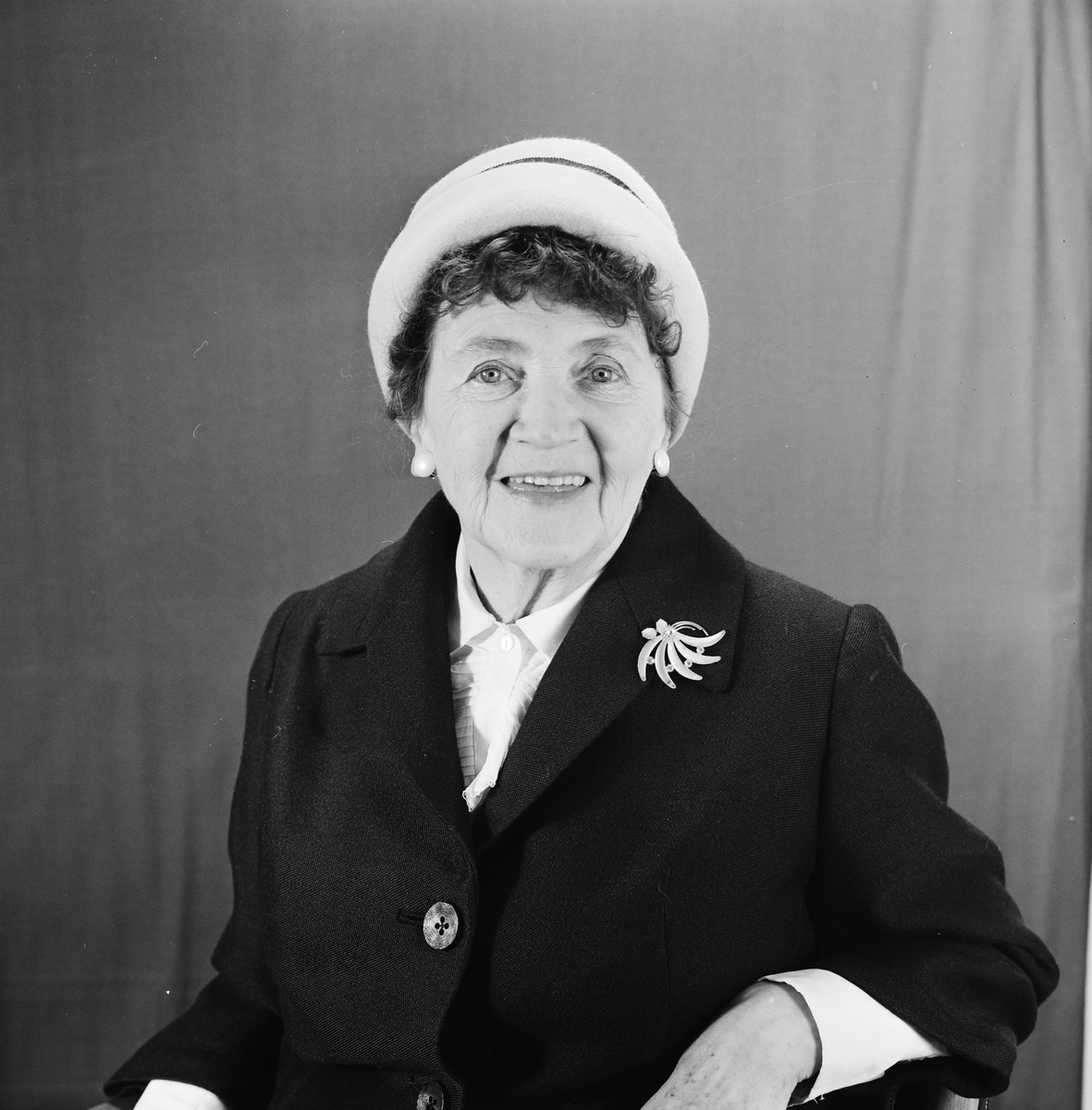
Gisken Wildenvey

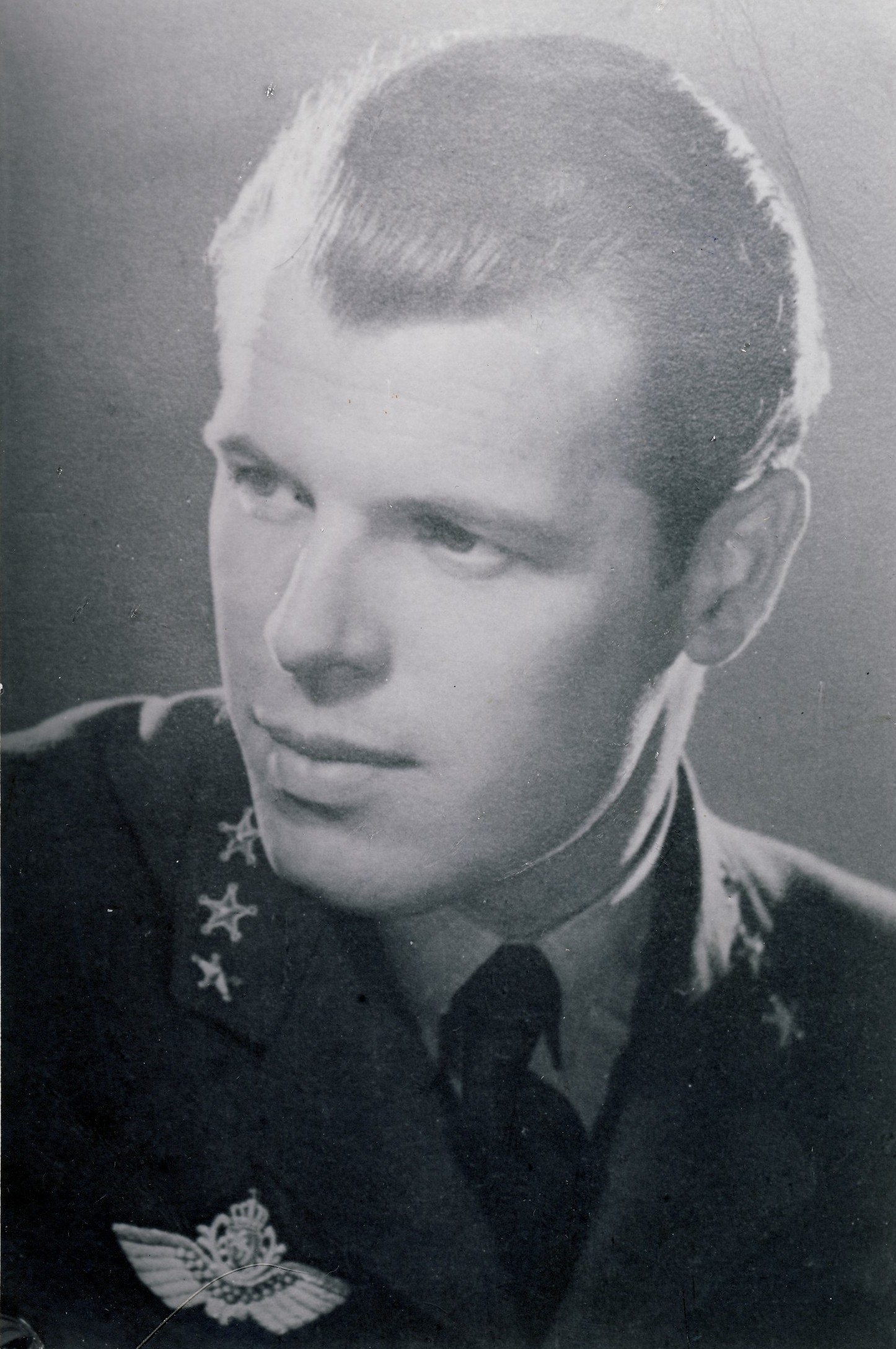
Einar Tufte-Johnsen

- 10 January – André Bjerke, writer and poet (born 1918)
- 14 January – Gisken Wildenvey, writer (born 1892).
- 16 January – Arnt Njargel, politician (born 1901)
- 19 January – Svein Rosseland, astrophysicist (born 1894)
- 6 February – Inger Hagerup, author, playwright and poet (born 1905)
- 6 February – Harald Johan Løbak, politician and Minister (born 1904)
- 4 March – Odd Rasdal, long-distance runner (born 1911)
- 4 March – Sverre Strandli, hammer thrower and European Champion (born 1925)
- 12 March – Ragnvald Marensius Gundersen, politician (born 1907)
- 27 March – Einar Tufte-Johnsen, aviation officer (born 1915).
- 7 April – Torstein Børte, politician (born 1899)
- 21 April – Astrid Hjertenæs Andersen, poet and travel writer (born 1915)
- 23 April – Asbjørn Sunde, sailor, saboteur and spy (born 1909)
- 24 April – Bernt Ingvaldsen, politician (born 1902)
- 26 April – Kåre Martin Hansen, politician (born 1913)
- 17 May – Arnvid Vasbotten, jurist, Nazi civil servant and politician (born 1903).
- 28 May – Haakon Hansen, boxer (born 1907)
- 29 May – Einar Thorsrud, psychologist, researcher and professor (born 1923)
- 18 June – Axel Strøm, physician (born 1901).
- 26 June – Torstein Kvamme, politician (born 1893)
- 9 July – Trygve Braarud, botanist (born 1903)
- 21 July – Arthur Klæbo, journalist (born 1908).
- 5 August – Olav Kielland, composer and conductor (born 1901)
- 12 August – Halvor Bjellaanes, politician (born 1925)
- 12 August – Kåre Stokkeland, politician (born 1918)
- 22 August – Peter Torleivson Molaug, politician (born 1902)
- 26 August – Ole Rømer Aagaard Sandberg, politician (born 1900)
- 7 September – Finn Seemann, international soccer player (born 1944)
- 4 October – Trond Halvorsen Wirstad, politician (born 1904)
- 19 October – Axel Proet Høst, lawyer and sports executive (born 1907).
- 30 October – Nils Hjelmtveit, politician and Minister (born 1892)
- 10 November – Olav Sunde, javelin thrower and Olympic bronze medallist (born 1903)
- 22 November – Gudolf Blakstad, architect (born 1893)
- 16 December – Jan Bull, author and theatre instructor (born 1927)

=== Full date unknown ===
- Thorbjørn Feyling, ceramist and designer (born 1907)
