= Tor Erling Staff =

Norwegian criminal defense lawyer (1933–2018)

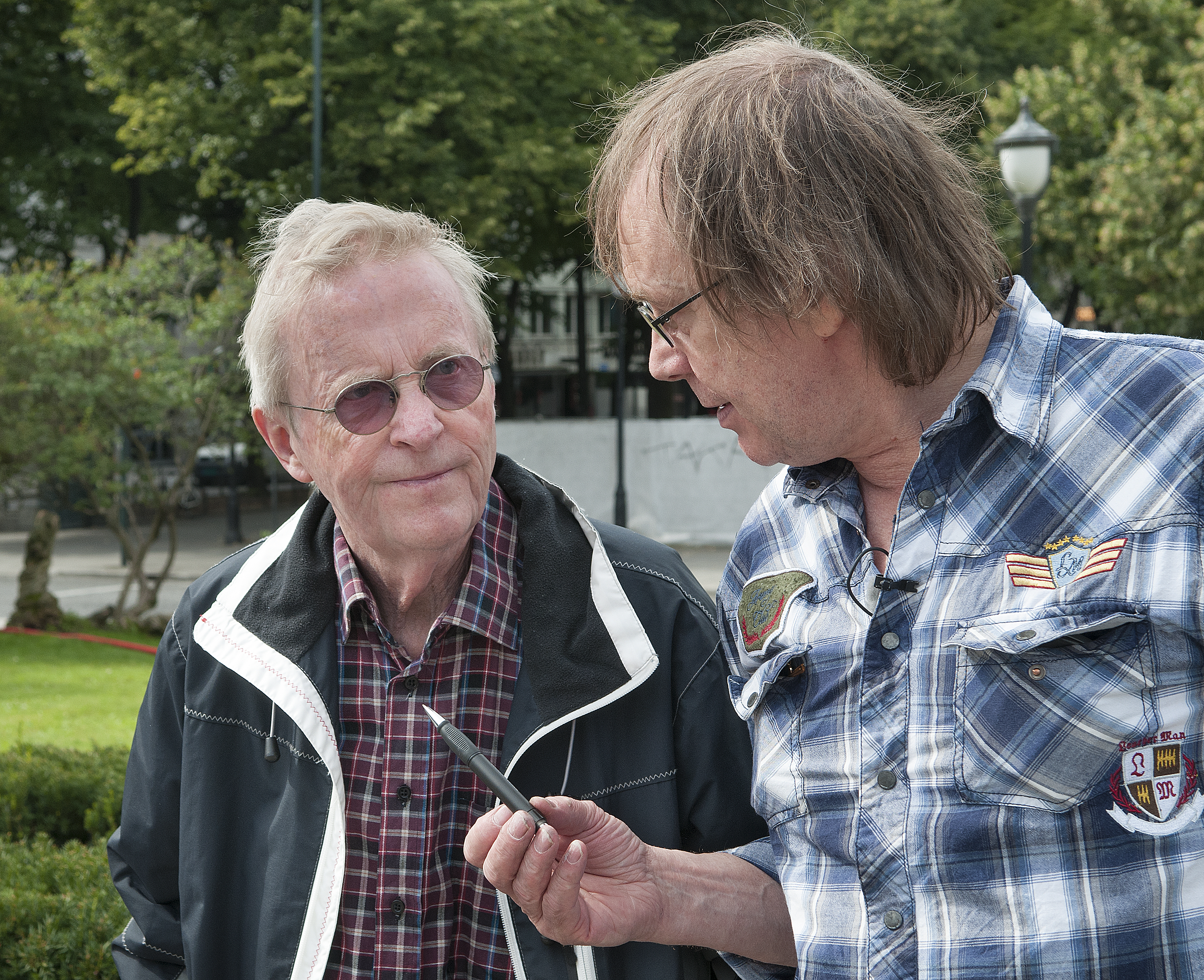
- Staff (left) with Øystein Meier Johannessen
- Born: 22 February 1933; Oslo, Norway
- Died: 22 July 2018 (aged 85); Oslo, Norway
- Education: University of Oslo
- Occupation: Lawyer

Tor Erling Staff (22 February 1933 – 22 July 2018) was a Norwegian criminal defense lawyer. He was particularly known for taking controversial cases.

Staff was born in Oslo. As a student he chaired the Norwegian Students' Society in Oslo in the spring of 1956, graduating with the cand.jur. degree in 1958. He started working for barrister Olaf Trampe Kindt and for stipendiary magistrate Christian Bernt Apenes. He continued his studies in the United States. From 1967 he worked as a lawyer in Oslo and at the Supreme Court.
