= Rulffs =

Rulffs is a Germanic surname. Notable people with the surname include:

- Bøicke Johan Rulffs Koren (1828–1909), Norwegian politician
- Manfred Rulffs (1935–2007), German rower
