= Eidnes =

Eidnes is a surname. Notable people with the surname include:

- Arnljot Karstein Eidnes (1909–1990), Norwegian politician
- Hans Eidnes (1887–1962), Norwegian politician
