= Gjesdal =

Gjesdal may refer to:

== People ==
- Gjesdal (surname)

== Places ==
- Gjesdal Municipality, a municipality in Rogaland county, Norway
- Gjesdal (village), a village within Gjesdal Municipality in Rogaland county, Norway
- Gjesdal Church, a church in Gjesdal Municipality in Rogaland county, Norway
