= Gjesdal (surname) =

Gjesdal is a Norwegian surname. Notable people with the surname include:

- Frøystein Gjesdal (born 1956), Norwegian economist
- Henrik Gjesdal (born 1993), Norwegian footballer
- Kristin Gjesdal (born 1969), Norwegian philosopher
- Tor Gjesdal (1909–1973), Norwegian journalist and civil servant
