= Søren H. H. Larsen =

Norwegian physicist (1920–1997)

Søren Hagerup Holck Larsen (9 June 1920 – 30 August 1997) was a Norwegian physicist.

During the war he joined the Norwegian forces in Sweden in 1944 and took part in the liberation of Northern Norway in 1945. After the war he attended the University of Oslo where he earned a cand.real. degree in 1950. He received his ph.d. in 1958 from Oxford University with Professor Gordon Dobson as supervisor.

From 1955 he was amanuensis at the Auroral Observatory in Tromsø. From 1959 to 1962 he was university lecturer at the University of Oslo, then at the University of Chicago until 1963. In 1963-1964 he was research scientist at NCAR in Boulder, Colorado.

In 1964 Søren Larsen returned to the University of Oslo where he was a lecturer until 1987, and finally ending his career as a senior research scientist funded by the Norwegian research council NAVF until his retirement in 1990.

Søren Larsen was a pioneer studying stratospheric ozone. During 1950 and 1951 he measured ozone in Longyearbyen at Svalbard using a Dobson spectrometer. These measurements were the first from a high arctic station. Later these measurements were important for Dobson when he commenced his ozone measurements in Antarctica in 1956.

Larsen’s measurements from Norway are some of the oldest on record and they are an important contribution to evaluating the stratospheric ozone levels before the introduction of CFCs into the atmosphere. They are also some of the longest measured series available.

From 1968 to 1984 he was member of the International Ozone Commission.

== Sources ==
- Søren H. H. Larsen. Store norske leksikon (2012-02-19)
- Thormod Henriksen, Solstråling, Gyldendal, 2002 ISBN 82-05-30406-8
