= Jan Iversen =

Norwegian politician

Jan Iversen (5 June 1916 – 25 August 1999) was a Norwegian politician for the Christian Democratic Party.

He served as a deputy representative in the Norwegian Parliament from Sør-Trøndelag during the term 1973–1977.

On the local level Iversen was mayor of Frøya Municipality from 1975 to 1979.
