= Bjarne Kjørberg =

Norwegian politician (1916–1969)

Bjarne Kjørberg (22 June 1916 – 12 December 1969) was a Norwegian politician for the Christian Democratic Party.

He served as a deputy representative to the Norwegian Parliament from Rogaland during the terms 1965–1969 and 1969–1973. He died shortly into the second term.
