= Torrey Mosvold =

Norwegian businessman

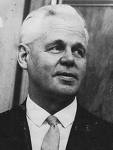
- Torrey Mosvold
- Born: 9 July 1910; Farsund, Norway
- Died: 18 October 1995 (aged 85); Florida, U.S.
- Occupation: Shipowner

Torrey Josef Mosvold (9 July 1910 – 18 October 1995) was one of Norway's leading shipping and industrial entrepreneurs.

Torrey Josef Mosvold was born in Farsund in the county of Lister og Mandal, Norway. He was the son of Nils Martin Mosvold (1876-1956) who founded the Mosvold Shipping Group in 1910. Torrey married Gudny Langeland and they had 6 children. Gudny died in 1954. After Martin Mosvold died 1956, the original company interests were split between his sons.

Torrey Mosvold was director of the Norwegian Shipowners' Association (Norges Rederiforbund) as well as several companies associated with Mosvold Shipping Group. He was a member of the national board of the Mission Covenant Church of Norway. He was a patron of the Mosvold Hospital in Ingwavuma, Republic of South Africa. He was proclaimed Commander of the Royal Norwegian Order of St. Olav in 1971.

Torrey Mosvold has 31 grandchildren.

== Biography ==
Born in Farsund, Vest‑Agder, Mosvold grew up in Kristiansand and helped his father restart the shipping business after the post‑World‑War‑I crisis. As a young man he worked in Chicago and studied at Trinity Bible School in Minneapolis. In 1937 he and his father took control of Kristiansand Dampskibsselskap, which operated the ferry route between Kristiansand and Frederikshavn (later Hirtshals), and they later sold the ferry business to Color Line in 1990. Together with his brother‑in‑law Kristian Haanes, Mosvold founded the shipping firm A/S Mosnes Shipping in 1946 and helped establish Norsk Wallboardfabrikk in Vennesla and the marine insurance company Neptun in 1949. He diversified the family businesses into real‑estate investments in Chicago, a mink farm in Michigan and various industrial ventures in Norway, including the Fibo fibreboard factory and a glove factory at Lyngdal; he also exported Norwegian furniture to Ethiopia and the Persian Gulf. Mosvold sat on the board of the Norwegian Shipowners’ Association and of several companies in Norway and abroad, served on the national board of the Mission Covenant Church of Norway and chaired Ansgar Bible College. He was appointed a Knight, First Class of the Order of St. Olav in 1971.
