= Einar Tufte-Johnsen =

Norwegian aviation officer

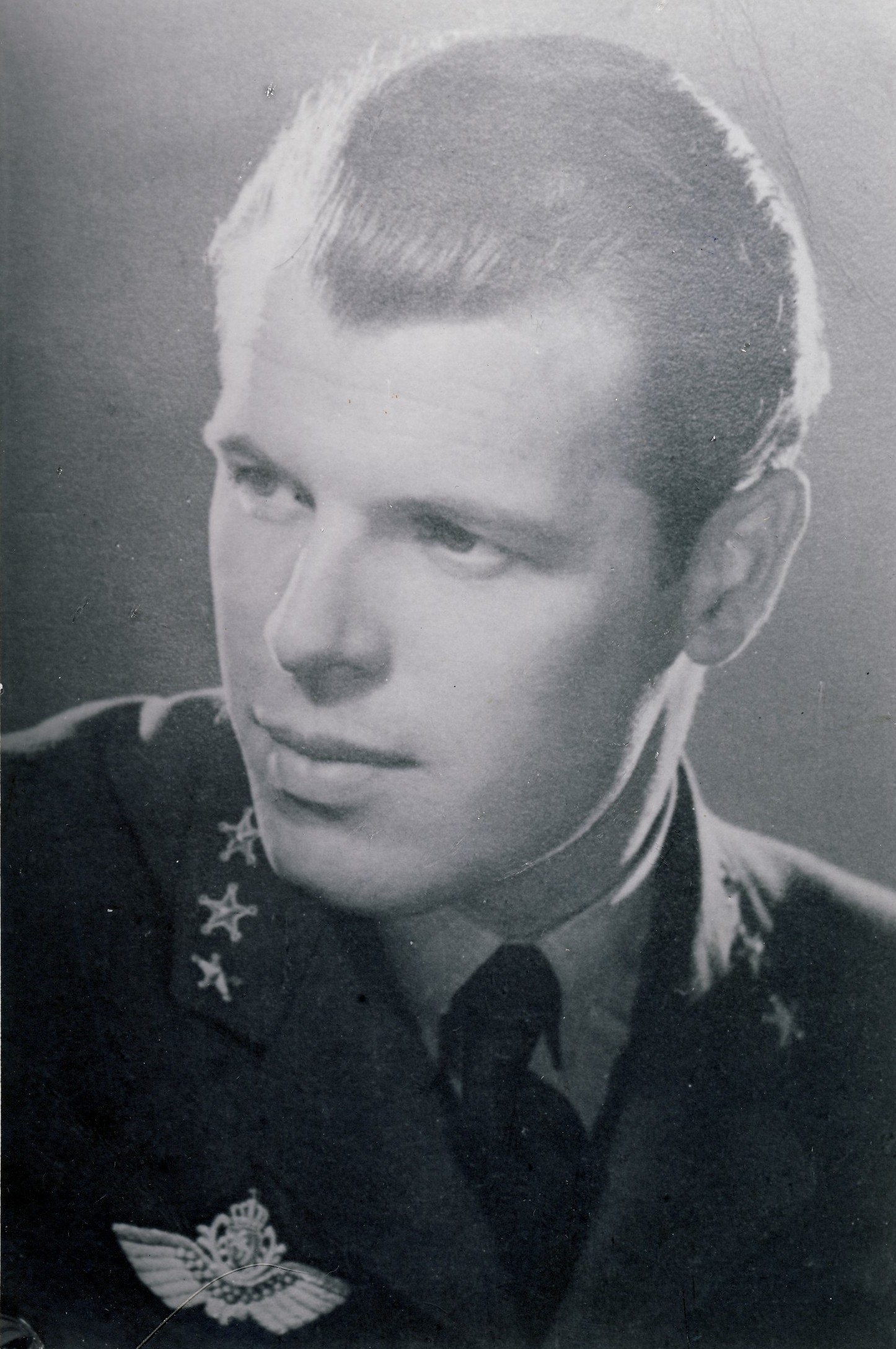
- Born: 19 August 1915; Porsgrunn, Norway
- Died: 27 March 1985 (aged 69)
- Occupation: Aviation officer
- Awards: Order of St. Olav

Einar Tufte-Johnsen (19 August 1915 – 27 March 1985) was a Norwegian aviation officer.

He was born in Porsgrunn to Einar Holm Johnsen and Ellen Andrea Olsen. He graduated as pilot in 1936, and from the Norwegian Military Academy in 1938. Tufte-Johnsen was a pilot instructor at Kjeller during the winter 1930–1940, and after the German invasion of Norway he took part in the evacuation of the site, first to Sweden. He relocated to Bardufoss, where he served as a flight commander during the Norwegian Campaign. He joined the Norwegian government at their evacuation with HMS Devonshire to the United Kingdom, and continued on to Little Norway in Toronto, Canada. He continued his military career after the Second World War, and was promoted lieutenant colonel in 1947, colonel in 1951, major general in 1953, and lieutenant general in 1963. He was stationed in Bodø from 1956, as head of Luftkommando Nord-Norge. From 1966 he served as head of the NATO Defense College in Paris, and organized the relocation of the college to Rome in 1967. He was decorated Commander of the Order of St. Olav in 1972.
