= Øivind Wilhelmsen =

Norwegian professor of physical chemistry

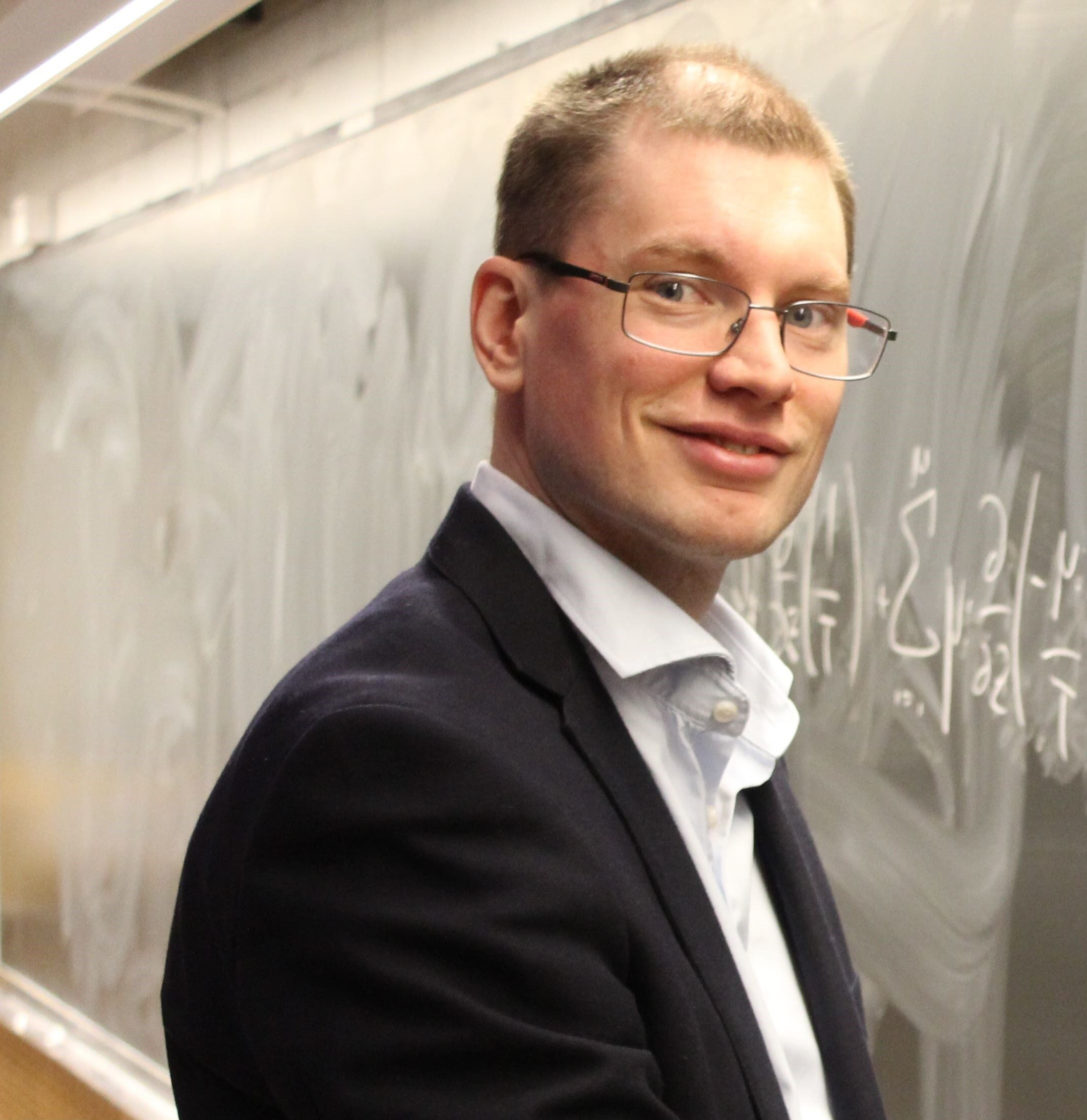
- Wilhelmsen in 2022
- Born: 1985-11-14
- Education: Norwegian University of Science and Technology (NTNU)
- Occupation: Professor of physical chemistry
- Scientific career
- Fields: Physical chemistry
- Workplaces: Norwegian University of Science and Technology (NTNU), SINTEF
- Thesis: Equilibrium and nonequilibrium thermodynamics of planar and curved interfaces (2015)
- Website: oivindw.com

Øivind Wilhelmsen (born 1985) is a Norwegian professor of physical chemistry at the Norwegian University of Science and Technology in Trondheim (NTNU), Norway. There he is head of the Thermodynamics group and serves as principal investigator at PoreLab, a Center of excellence. His area of research is thermodynamics, with emphasis on non-equilibrium thermodynamics.

His most important research contributions are within transport processes across planar and curved interfaces, the understanding of nucleation phenomena, thermodynamics of hydrogen and CO_{2} mixtures, and the thermodynamics of nano systems. He has received an ERC Starting Grant from the European Research Council.

== Education and professional career ==
Wilhelmsen completed his PhD in physical chemistry at NTNU in 2015 with the thesis Equilibrium and nonequilibrium thermodynamics of planar and curved interfaces. Since 2010, he has worked as a researcher, later senior research scientist, at the Norwegian research organization SINTEF. In the period 2016–2021, he worked as a part-time professor at the Department of Energy and process engineering at NTNU, and in 2021 he was appointed full-time professor of physical chemistry at NTNU.

He has been a visiting scientist at ETH Zurich, University of Barcelona, Imperial College London and the University of Stuttgart.

== Publications ==
- Øivind Wilhelmsen publications indexed by Google Scholar
- List of publications by Øivind Wilhelmsen in BIBSYS (Norway)
- List of publications by Øivind Wilhelmsen in CRIStin (The Norwegian Scientific Index)

== Awards and honours ==
Wilhelmsen has received both national and international awards for his research, most notably the Ilya Prigogine Prize, the EFCE Excellence Award in Thermodynamics and the Research Council if Norway's Award for outstanding young scientists.

In 2023, he was awarded an ERC Starting Grant from the European Research Council with funding of €1.5 million.
