= Knut Gravråk =

Norwegian politician

Knut Gravråk (born 15 May 1985) is a Norwegian politician for the Labour Party.

He served as a deputy representative to the Norwegian Parliament from Sør-Trøndelag during the terms 2005–2009 and 2009–2013. In total he met during 328 days of parliamentary session.

On the local level he has been a member of the municipal council of Melhus Municipality.
