= Egil Halmøy =

Norwegian politician

Egil Halmøy (2 October 1901 – 24 January 1984) was a Norwegian politician for the Liberal Party.

He served as a deputy representative to the Norwegian Parliament from Sør-Trøndelag during the term 1961–1965.
