= Sigmund P. Haave =

Norwegian politician

Sigmund P. Haave (24 August 1916 – 5 June 2001) was a Norwegian politician for the Liberal Party.

He served as a deputy representative to the Parliament of Norway from Troms during the term 1965–1969. At the time he was the county agricultural director in Troms, with residence in Målselv Municipality. In 1968 he was hired as county agricultural director in Telemark.
