= Thomas Bucher-Johannessen =

Norwegian cross-country skier (born 1997)

Personal information
- Nationality: Norway
- Born: 3 February 1997 (age 29)

Sport
- Sport: Skiing
- Club: Fossum IF

World Cup career
- Seasons: 2 – (2019, 2023–present)
- Indiv. starts: 2
- Indiv. podiums: 0
- Team starts: 0
- Overall titles: 0 – (108th in 2019)
- Discipline titles: 0
- Updated on 28 March 2023

Thomas Qvist Bucher-Johannessen (born 3 February 1997) is a Norwegian cross-country skier.

At the 2016 Junior World Championships he finished sixth in the 10 kilometres, followed by a ninth place in 2017 and a sixth place as best at the 2019 Junior World Championships. He made his World Cup debut in March 2019 at the Holmenkollen ski festival, where he also collected his first World Cup points with a 13th-place finish at the Holmenkollen 50 km.

He represents the sports club Fossum IF and Team AF Håndverk.

== Cross-country skiing results ==
All results are sourced from the International Ski Federation (FIS).

=== World Cup ===
==== Season standings ====
Season	Age	Discipline standings				Ski Tour standings		
Season	Age	Overall	Distance	Sprint	U23	Nordic Opening	Tour de Ski	World Cup Final
2019	22	108	73	—	14	—	—	—
2023	26	130	77	—	—N/a	—N/a	—	—N/a
