= Jentoft Jensen =

Norwegian politician

Jentoft Jensen (1 May 1901 – 24 June 1953) was a Norwegian politician for the Labour Party.

He served as a deputy representative to the Norwegian Parliament from Finnmark during the terms 1945–1949.
