= Wilhelm Münter Rolfsen =

Norwegian lawyer and judge (1913–2002)

- Born: 11 May 1913; Kristiania, Norway
- Died: 8 December 2002 (aged 89)
- Occupations: journalist, barrister and film producer
- Awards: King George VI Commendation for Brave Conduct; Order of the Lion of Finland

Wilhelm Münter Rolfsen (11 May 1913 – 8 December 2002) was a Norwegian barrister, resistance member and film producer. During the German occupation of Norway he was actively involved in the resistance movement, particularly by organising a network for escorting refugees to Sweden. He took part as a prosecutor in the legal purge in Norway after World War II, and he wrote two books about his wartime experiences. He was involved in film productions, including Nine Lives and Struggle for Eagle Peak

== Early and personal life ==
Rolfsen was born in Kristiania, a son of wholesaler Christen Rolfsen and Astrid Münter. He finished his secondary education in 1931, finished officer's training in 1932 and graduated from the Royal Frederick University with the cand.jur. degree in law in 1937. In 1937 he married banker's daughter Randi Kvaal.

== Career ==
Rolfsen worked as a journalist for the newspaper Morgenbladet, and established himself as a lawyer from 1941. During the German occupation of Norway he took part in the resistance movement. He joined the Hjemmefrontens Sentralledelse in 1943. For a period in 1943, Rolfsen was leader of Milorg's refugee escort network, called Edderkoppen (The Spider), until he eventually had to flee to Sweden later in 1943. He was a lieutenant for the Norwegian troops in Sweden from 1943 to 1945.

He published the book Fra Oscarsborg til Hegra in 1945, on the Norwegian Campaign in southern Norway. The book was based on lectures he had given in Sweden during the war. In 1946 he published Usynlige Veier ("Invisible paths"), on refugee escorts and courier traffic between Norway and Sweden during the war.

After the war he continued in his law firm, Rolfsen & Joys with Einar Joys. He took part as a prosecutor in the legal purge in Norway after World War II. In 1952 he became a barrister with access to working with Supreme Court cases. Through the company Nordsjøfilm he was involved in the film productions Shetlandsgjengen, Ni Liv from 1957 and Venner.

He was a board member of the Oslo branch of the Norwegian Bar Association from 1950 to 1956, of the Norwegian Film Producers' Association from 1955 to 1958 as well as the Riksmål organs Norsk Lytterforening (chairman 1955–1957 and 1958–1960) and Frisprog. He also chaired the Riksmål Society from 1966. In business he was a board member of Jernløkkens Mekaniske Verksted, Tandhjulfabriken, B.W.B. Braathen & Co., Norgear and Norfinn.

For his contributions during World War II he was decorated with the Norwegian Defence Medal 1940–1945 with rosette as well as the British King George VI Commendation for Brave Conduct. He also received the Knighthood of the Order of the Lion of Finland. He died in December 2002 and was buried at Vestre gravlund.
