= Oddvar Reiakvam =

Norwegian politician (born 1985)

Oddvar Hallset Reiakvam (born 4 June 1985) is a Norwegian politician as a member of the Progress Party.

He served as a deputy representative to the Norwegian Parliament from Sogn og Fjordane during the terms 2005–2009 and 2009–2013. In total he met during 56 days of parliamentary session.
