= Karsten Buer =

Norwegian harness coach

Karsten Buer (22 May 1913 – 29 November 1993) was a Norwegian harness coach.

He was born in Øymark. Buer was the leading harness racer in Norway in the 1950s and 1960s. During his career he won more than 2,000 races. He became the first European Champion in harness racing, in Germany in 1969, and earned a silver medal at the 1971 European Championships. In 1969 he published the autobiography 10 ganger rundt jorden med hest. He was an honorary member of the Norwegian Trotting Association.
