= Jenny Søyseth =

Norwegian politician

Jenny Søyseth (6 April 1922 – 23 June 1997) was a Norwegian politician for the Conservative Party.

She served as a deputy representative to the Parliament of Norway from Vest-Agder during the term 1973–1977. In total she met during 22 days of parliamentary session.

She lived in 4610, Kristiansand, Agder (Previously the county Vest agder)
