= Hans Hjelle =

Norwegian politician

Hans Hjelle (17 March 1916 – 9 July 2008) was a Norwegian politician for the Liberal Party.

He served as a deputy representative to the Parliament of Norway from Møre og Romsdal during the terms 1958–1961 and 1961–1965. In total he met during 76 days of parliamentary session.
