= Rolf Andersen (politician) =

Norwegian politician

Rolf Andersen (12 September 1916 – 27 July 1990) was a Norwegian politician for the Labour Party.

He served as a deputy representative to the Parliament of Norway from Østfold during the term 1969–1973. In total he met during 5 days of parliamentary session.
