= Anna Sofie Herland =

Norwegian politician

Anna Sofie Herland (10 March 1913 - 7 February 1990) was a Norwegian politician for the Liberal Party.

She served as a deputy representative to the Norwegian Parliament from Sogn og Fjordane during the terms 1958–1961 and 1961–1965.
