= Thorleif Kristensen =

Norwegian politician

Thorleif Kristensen (15 February 1916 – 6 June 1997) was a Norwegian politician for the Labour Party.

He served as a deputy representative to the Norwegian Parliament from Østfold during the term 1965–1969.

Kristensen was born in Moss and was a member of Moss city council during the term 1959–1963.
