= Eldrid Erdal =

Norwegian politician

Eldrid Erdal (30 January 1901 – 1 December 1997) was a Norwegian politician for the Liberal Party.

She was born in Naustdal Municipality.

She served as a deputy representative to the Norwegian Parliament from Møre og Romsdal during the term 1961–1965. On the local level she was a deputy member of the municipal council of Molde Municipality from 1951 to 1967.
