= Bøicke Johan Rulffs Koren =

Norwegian politician

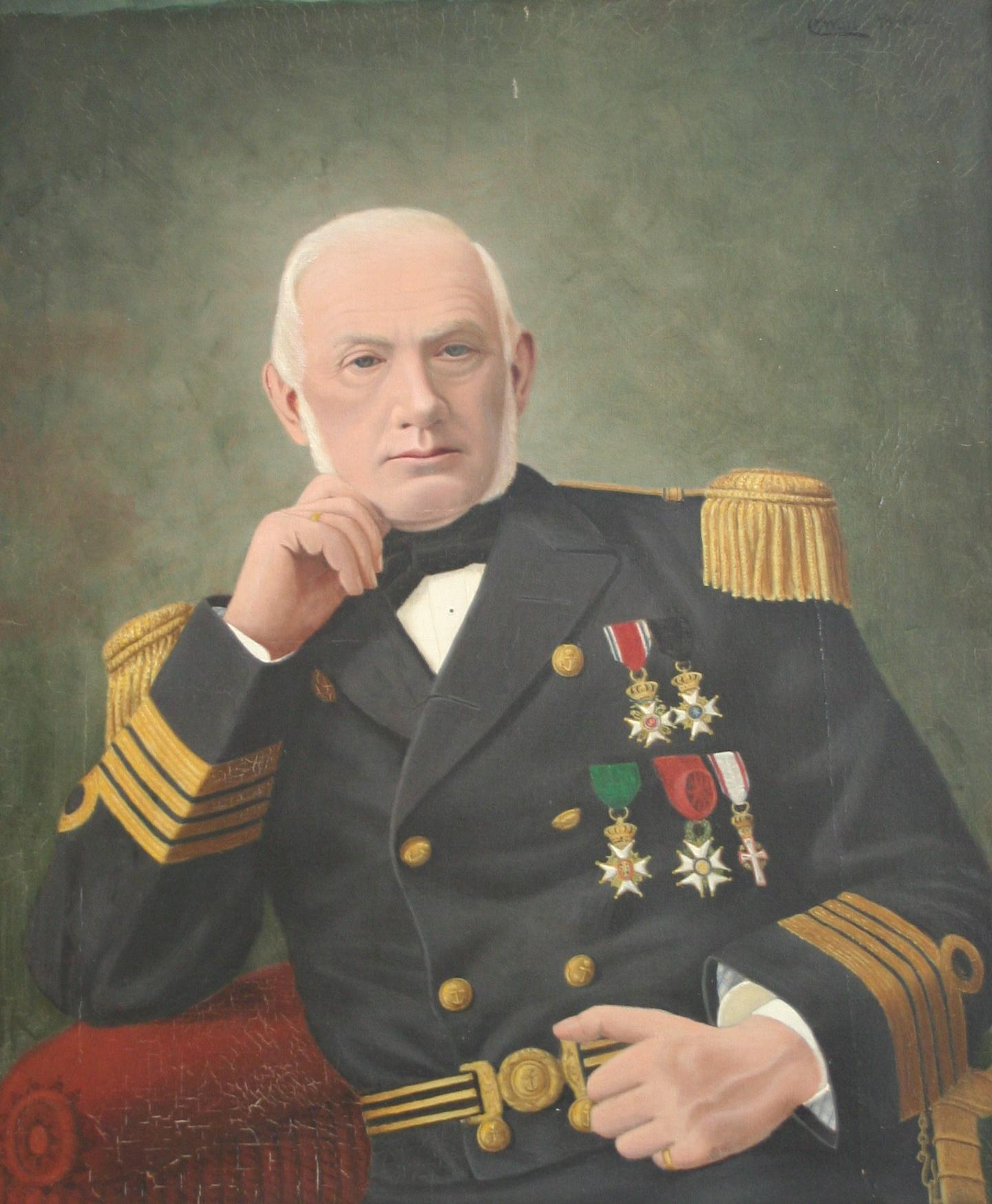
Portrait of Bøicke Johan Rulffs Koren by Ole Peter Hansen Balling (between 1875 and 1879)

Bøicke Johan Rulffs Koren (1828–1909) was Norwegian Minister of the Navy in 1884.
