= Arnljot Karstein Eidnes =

Norwegian politician

Arnljot Karstein Eidnes (18 July 1909 - 13 May 1990) is a Norwegian politician for the Liberal Party.

He served as a deputy representative to the Norwegian Parliament from Troms during the terms 1961–1965 and 1965–1969.
