= Ole Borge =

Norwegian resistance member

Ole Borge (4 May 1916 – 24 May 1995) was a Norwegian jurist and resistance member during World War II.

He was born in Kristiania (now Oslo), Norway. He studied law at the University of Oslo. He was a member of the central Milorg leadership from 1943 to 1945. As a lawyer he served as prosecutor during the legal purge after the war. He contributed to the establishment of the Norway's Resistance Museum, and was chairman of the board from 1971 to 1995. He was decorated with the King's Medal for Courage.
