= Tor Gjesdal =

Norwegian journalist and civil servant

- Born: 24 October 1909; Dybvaag Municipality, Norway
- Died: 3 July 1973 (aged 63)
- Occupations: Journalist and civil servant
- Awards: Order of St. Olav (1960, 1970)

Tor Gjesdal (24 October 1909 – 3 July 1973) was a Norwegian journalist and civil servant. He was born in Dybvaag Municipality in Aust-Agder county, and grew up in Sandnes in Rogaland county. He was a journalist in the newspaper 1ste Mai from 1929, and for Arbeiderbladet from 1936. During World War II he was press counsellor for the Norwegian government-in-exile in London. From 1946 he worked for the United Nations. He was decorated Knight, First Class of the Order of St. Olav in 1960, and Commander in 1970.
