= Arnt Njargel =

Norwegian politician

Arnt Njargel (17 March 1901 – 16 January 1985) was a Norwegian politician for the Liberal Party.

He served as a deputy representative to the Norwegian Parliament from Oppland during the term 1961–1965.
