= Olaf Trampe Kindt =

Norwegian barrister

- Born: 17 March 1913; Trondhjem
- Died: 19 May 1995 (aged 82); Brumunddal
- Relatives: Eyvind Getz (aunt)

Olaf Trampe Kindt (17 March 1913 – 19 May 1995) was a Norwegian barrister.

== Personal life ==
He was born in Trondhjem as a son of engineer Fredrik Christopher Trampe Kindt (1885–1913) and Ellen Getz (1887–1973). His mother, who was a sister of Eyvind Getz, was married to insurance director Nicolay Lysholm Bugge from 1918. His sister Johanne was married to physician Odd Bjercke.

In 1940 he married Kari Sandberg, a daughter of Major Ole Rømer Aagaard Sandberg.

== Career ==
He finished his secondary education in 1931 and graduated from the Royal Frederick University with the cand.jur. degree in 1937. After staying abroad for one year he was a deputy judge in Sør-Hedmark District Court from 1939 to 1940 and attorney at Otta from 1941 to 1944. After the occupation of Norway by Nazi Germany, he was decorated with the Defence Medal 1940–1945 for resistance, and from 1945 to 1948 he worked as a public prosecutor in the post-war legal purge in Oppland.

In 1947 he became a partner in the law firm Mortensen, Eger & Manner together with Adolf Eger and Erling Manner. From 1948 he was a barrister with access to work with Supreme Court cases. He later partnered with Erik Bryn, Roar Bjerknes and Bjørn Eggen in their law firm, which became known as Bryn, Bjerknes, Wahl-Larsen & Co. He was secretary-general of Norges Akademikersamband (a forerunner of Akademikernes Fellesorganisasjon) from 1951 and chairman from 1965 to 1969.

He was a board member of Oslo Bar Association from 1949 to 1954 as well as the companies Norsk Farmasøytisk-kjemisk Astra, Wallco and Norsk Landbruk.

== Later life and death ==
After retiring in 1976 Kindt retreated to the rural manor Hedemarksvollen in Brumunddal, near the birthplace of his wife. He died on 19 May 1995 at the age of 82.
