= Olav Moen =

Norwegian politician

Olav Moen (19 October 1909 – 5 June 1995) was a Norwegian politician for the Liberal Party.

He served as a deputy representative to the Norwegian Parliament from Oppland during the term 1973–1977.
