= Harald Gustav Nilsen =

Norwegian illustrator

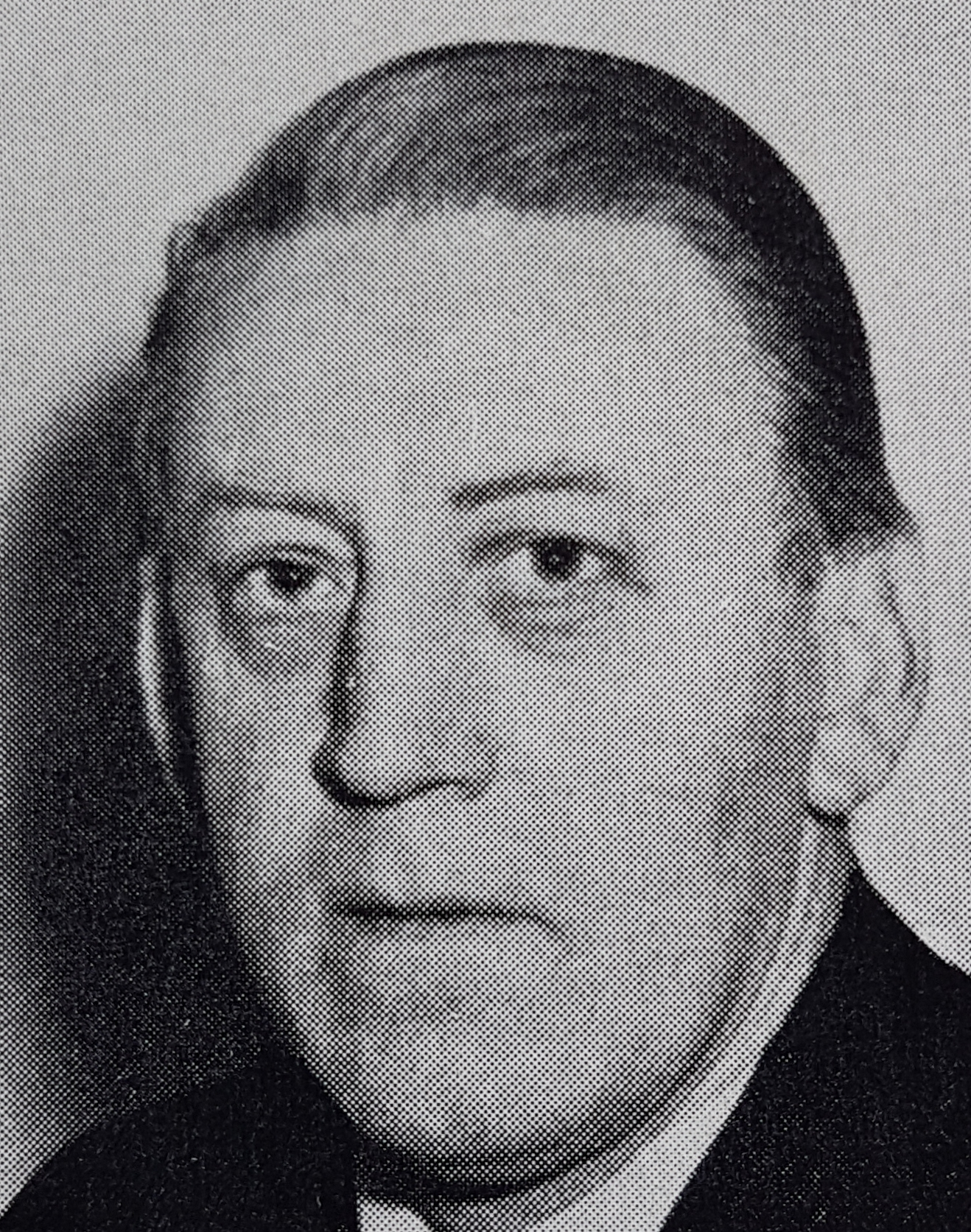
- Born: 7 April 1909; Kristiania, Norway
- Died: 17 March 1997 (aged 87)
- Occupation: illustrator

Harald Gustav Nilsen (7 April 1909 – 17 March 1997) was a Norwegian illustrator. He was born in Kristiania.

He was educated as painter and illustrator as well as printer, and worked for the newspaper Aftenposten for many years. Among his books is the children's book Merkelige dyr fra land og sjø from 1946, Seks boksamlere forteller from 1960, and Kjære Oslo – streiftog og skildringer from 1982.
