= 1911 in Norway =

- Centuries: 18th; 19th; 20th; 21st
- Decades: 1890s; 1900s; 1910s; 1920s; 1930s
- See also: List of years in Norway

Events in the year 1911 in Norway.

== Incumbents ==
- Monarch – Haakon VII.

== Events ==
- 14 December – Roald Amundsen's Norwegian expedition becomes the first to reach the South Pole.
- Norsk Hydro's second plant opens at Rjukan, four years after its first plant at Notodden.
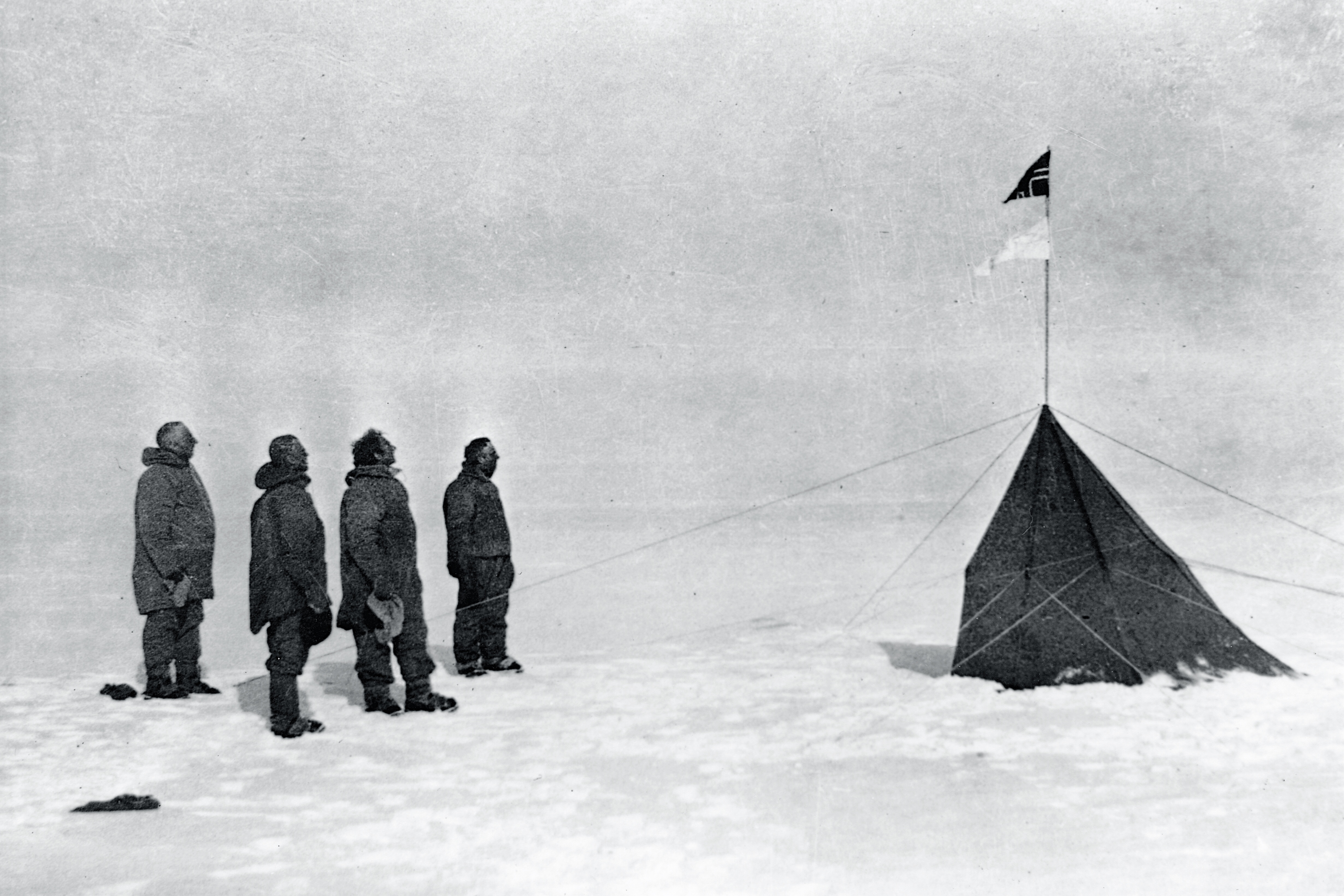
Amundsen (at left) and companions at Polheim, South Pole, December 1911.

== Popular culture ==
=== Sports ===
- 19 June – Molde FK football club is founded.

=== Literature ===
- The Olav Duun novel Gamal jord (Old Soil) was published.

== Births ==
=== January to March ===
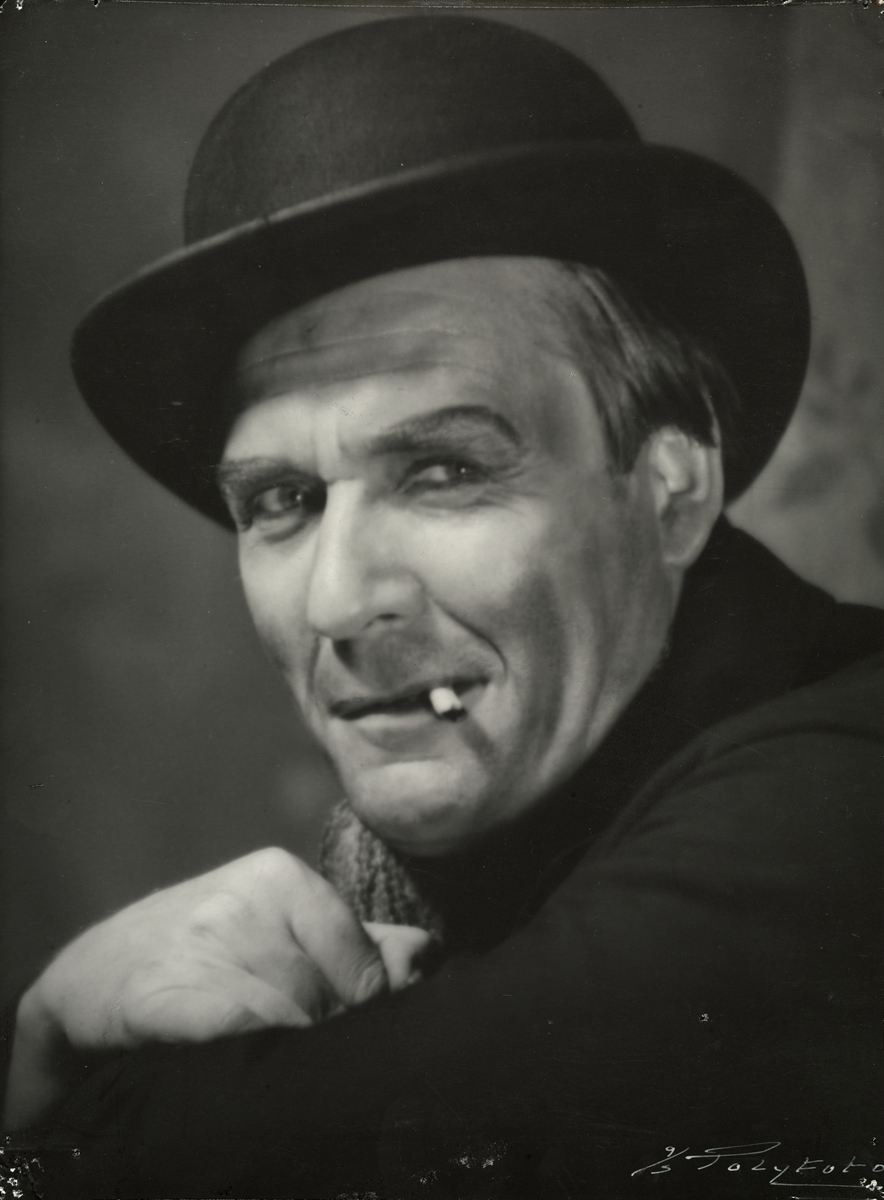
Harald Heide Steen

- 1 January – Håkon Melberg, linguist (died 1990)
- 11 January – Harald Heide Steen, actor (died 1980)
- 12 January – Halvor J. Sandsdalen, farmer, journalist, poet, novelist, playwright and children's writer (died 1998).
- 16 January – Arne Tuft, cross country skier (died 1989)
- 20 January – Andreas Wormdahl, politician (died 2001)
- 28 January – Sverre Engen, skier, ski coach, ski area manager and film-maker in America (died 2001)
- 31 January – Rigmor Frimannslund Holmsen, ethnologist (died 2006).
- 12 February – Charles Mathiesen, speed skater and Olympic gold medallist (died 1994)
- 21 February – Erling Fjellbirkeland, research administrator (died 1986).
- 3 March – Kristian Henriksen, international soccer player, coach (died 2004)
- 5 March – Nils Eriksen, international soccer player and Olympic bronze medallist (died 1975)

=== April to June ===
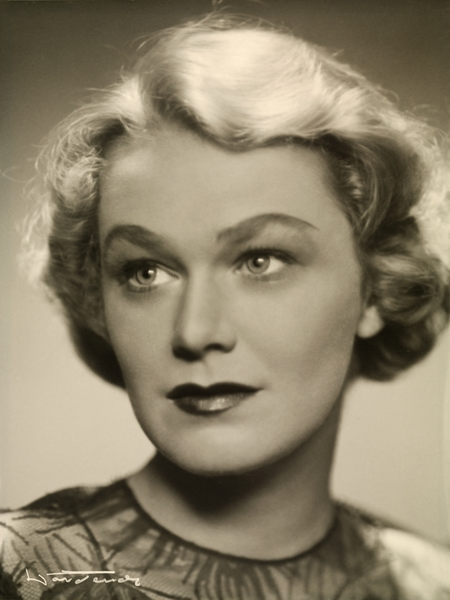
Randi Brænne

- 6 April – Per Tønder, politician (died 2015)
- 10 April – Kåre Christiansen, bobsledder (died 1964)
- 13 April – Thorstein Treholt, politician and Minister (died 1993)
- 14 April – Astrid Løken, entomologist (died 2008)
- 20 April – Reidar Andersen, ski jumper and Olympic bronze medallist (died 1991)
- 25 April – Hans Beck, ski jumper and Olympic silver medallist (died 1996)
- 18 May – Ole Myrvoll, professor in economy, politician and Minister (died 1988)
- 19 May – Petter Pettersson, Jr., politician (died 1984)
- 24 May – Egil Storbekken, folk musician (died 2002).
- 26 May – Randi Brænne, actress (died 2004).
- 27 May – Torolf Elster, newspaper and radio journalist, magazine editor, novelist, crime writer and short story writer (died 2006)
- 3 June – Olav Økern, cross country skier and Olympic bronze medallist (died 2000)

=== July to September ===
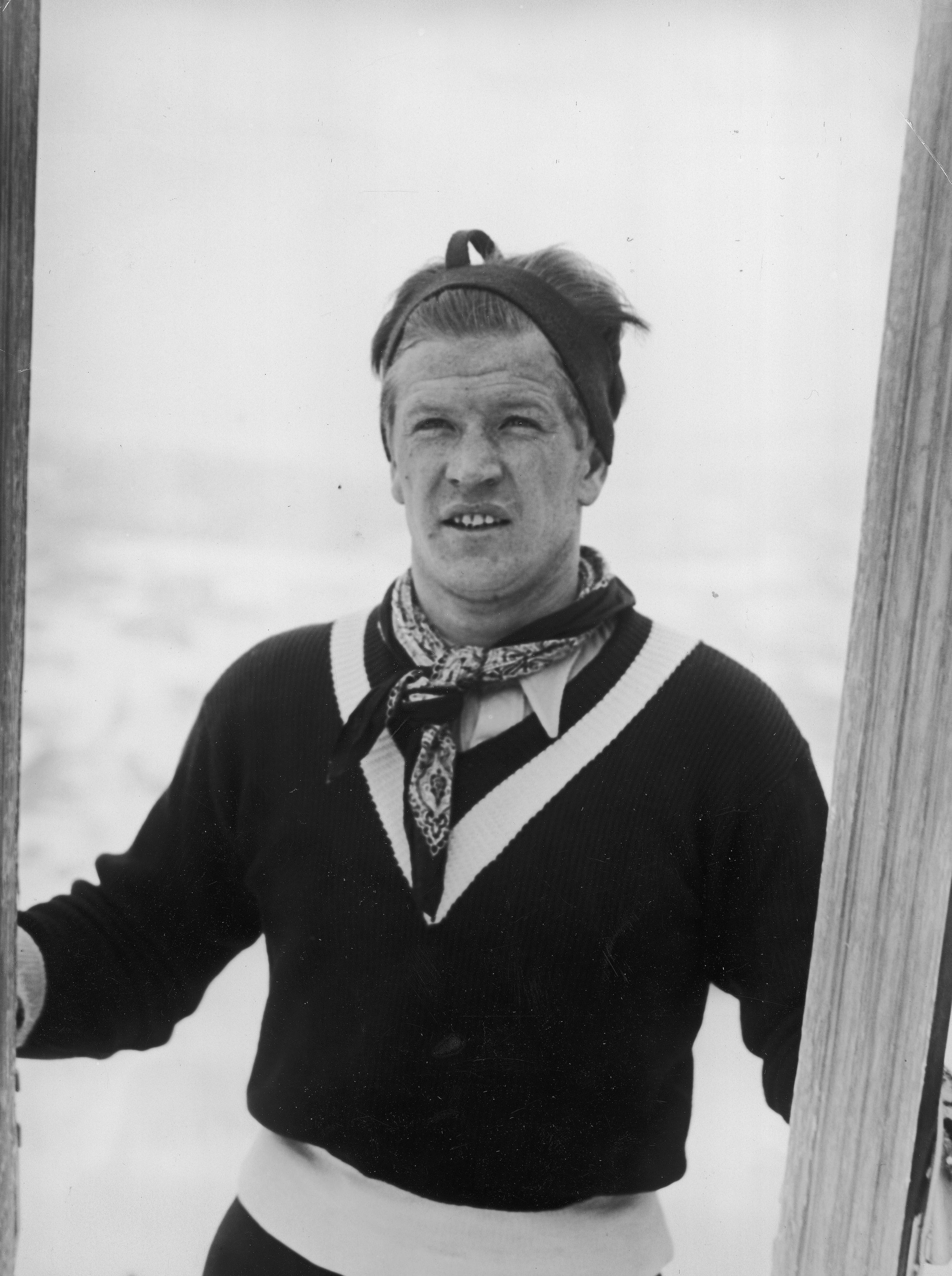
Birger Ruud

- 6 July – Odd Rasdal, long-distance runner (died 1985)
- 13 July – Torvald Kvinlaug, politician (died 1977)
- 18 July – Claus Marius Neergaard, politician (died 1990)
- 22 August – Edvard Hambro, politician and 25th President of the United Nations General Assembly (died 1977)
- 23 August – Birger Ruud, ski jumper, twice Olympic gold medallist and three time World Champion (died 1998)
- 25 August – Ragnar Haugen, boxer (died 1964)
- 10 September – Frithjof Ulleberg, soccer player and Olympic bronze medallist (died 1993)
- 12 September – Bjørn Fraser, naval and aviation officer (died 1993)
- 15 September – Karsten Solheim, golf club designer and businessman in America (died 2000)
- 20 September – Oddleif Fagerheim, politician (died 1999)
- 22 September – Inge Einarsen Bartnes, politician (died 1988)
- 23 September – Herman Hebler, printmaker and graphic artist (died 2007)
- 28 September – Nils Sønnevik, politician (died 1988)

=== October to December ===
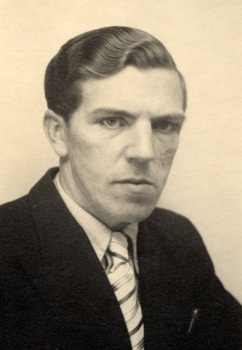
Trygve Haavelmo

- 1 October – Harald Sandvik, military officer (died 1992)
- 12 October – Johannes Lislerud, politician (died 1989)
- 15 October – Margith Johanne Munkebye, politician (died 2000)
- 2 November – Guri Johannessen, politician (died 1972)
- 6 November – Harald Nicolai Samuelsberg, politician (died 1986)
- 9 November – Ebba Lodden, politician (died 1997)
- 19 November – Harry Haraldsen, speed skater (died 1966)
- 13 December – Trygve Haavelmo, economist, awarded the Nobel Memorial Prize in Economic Sciences (died 1999)
- 29 December – Alf Martinsen, soccer player and Olympic bronze medallist (died 1988)

=== Full date unknown ===
- Henriette Bie Lorentzen, humanist, peace activist, feminist and editor (died 2001)
- Leif Iversen, politician (died 1989)
- Reidar Fauske Sognnaes, Dean of Harvard School of Dental Medicine, forensic scientist (died 1984)

== Deaths ==
- 4 January – Oscar Nissen, physician, newspaper editor and politician (born 1843)
- 15 January – Rosa Asmundsen, actress and singer (born 1846)
- 30 March – Sven Oftedal, helped found the Lutheran Free Church (born 1844)
- 14 June – Johan Svendsen, composer, conductor and violinist (born 1840)
- 2 September – Isak Kobro Collett, politician (born 1867)
- 30 October – Ulrik Frederik Christian Arneberg, politician (born 1829)
- 13 November – Cecilie Thoresen Krog, woman’s rights pioneer (born 1858).
- 5 December – Sofie Borchgrevink, educator (born 1846).
- 7 December – Marie Wexelsen, writer (born 1832).

=== Full date unknown ===
- Nils Christian Egede Hertzberg, politician and Minister (born 1827)
- Hans Møller, politician, consul and businessperson (born 1830)
- Harald Smedal, politician and Minister (born 1859)
