= 1914 in Norway =

- Centuries: 18th; 19th; 20th; 21st
- Decades: 1890s; 1900s; 1910s; 1920s; 1930s
- See also: List of years in Norway

Events in the year 1914 in Norway.

== Incumbents ==
- Monarch – Haakon VII.
- Prime Minister – Gunnar Knudsen

== Events ==
- May 5 – November 11 – The Jubilee Exhibition (Jubilæumsutstillingen) is held at Kristiania, Norway, to mark the centennial of the country's Constitution.

== Popular culture ==
=== Sports ===
- 25 June – Aalesunds FK football club was founded.

=== Literature ===
- Vaaren, novel by Sigrid Undset.
- The Olav Duun novel Tre venner (Three Friends) was published.

== Births ==
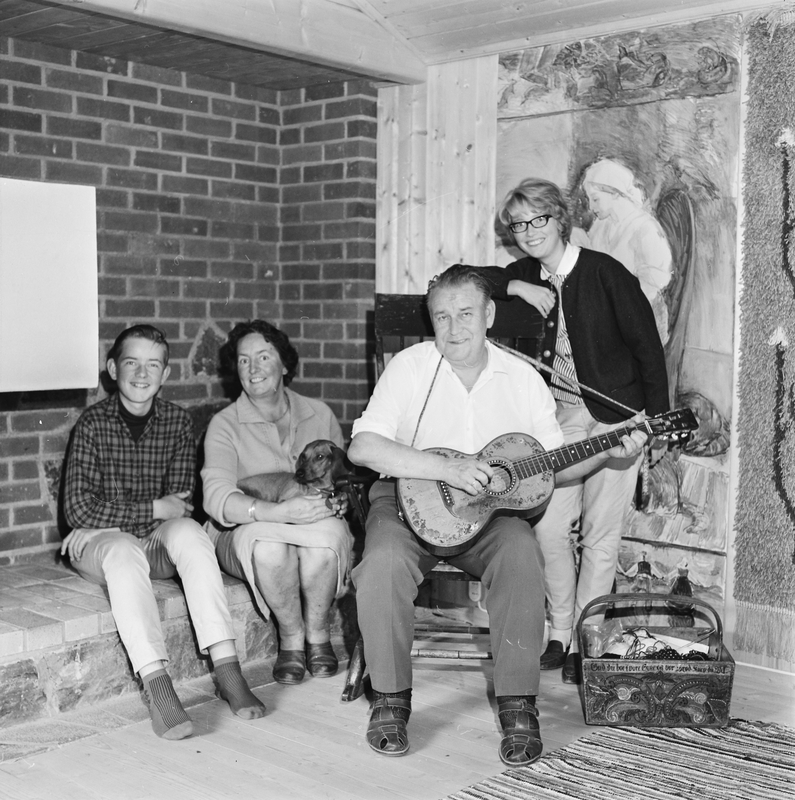
Alf Prøysen

- 4 January – Fredrik Stabel, illustrator and satirical writer (died 2001).
- 31 January – Hans Martin Gulbrandsen, canoeist (died 1979)
- 4 February – Tore Holthe, rear admiral (died 1973)
- 3 March – Håkon Johnsen, politician (died 1991)
- 7 March – Knut Bergsland, linguist (died 1998)
- 7 March – Arne Jensen, banker (died 2002)
- 18 March – Trygve Haugeland, politician and Minister (died 1998)
- 20 March – Lilly Bølviken, judge (died 2011)
- 9 April – Ottar Fjærvoll, politician (died 1995)
- 28 April – Johan Møller Warmedal, politician (died 1988)
- 29 April – Erling Evensen, cross country skier and Olympic bronze medallist (died 1998).
- 26 May – Edel Eckblad, actress (died 1994)
- 2 June – Alfred Thommesen, ship owner and politician (died 1988)
- 8 June – Kåre Siem, musician and writer (died 1986).
- 13 June – Olav Aase, politician (died 1992)
- 16 June – Otto Dahl, politician (died 1978)
- 17 June – Halvor Thorbjørn Hjertvik, politician (died 1995)
- 26 June – Arnfinn Severin Roald, politician (died 1983)
- 30 June – Magnar Hellebust, politician (died 2008)
- 5 July – Toralf Westermoen, engineer, pioneer for the development of high speed craft (died 1986)
- 6 July – Inga Lovise Tusvik, politician (died 1992)
- 11 July – Gøril Havrevold, actress (died 1992).
- 23 July – Reidar Kvammen, international soccer player (died 1998)
- 23 July – Alf Prøysen, writer and musician (died 1970)
- 9 August – Leif Hamre, military officer and children's writer (died 2007).
- 18 August – Oddvar Sponberg, race walker (died 1975)
- 24 August – Rolf Holmberg, soccer player and Olympic bronze medallist (died 1979)
- 24 August – Ivar Iversen, canoeist (died 2012).
- 21 September – Else Hagen, visual artist (died 2010).
- 30 September – Bjarne Flem, politician (died 1999)
- 6 October – Thor Heyerdahl, ethnographer and adventurer (died 2002)
- 27 October – Rolv Ryssdal, judge (died 1998)
- 15 November – Njål Hole, chemical engineer and nuclear physicist. (died 1988)

=== Full date unknown ===
- Undis Blikken, female speed skating pioneer and World Champion (died 1992)
- Sigurd Engelstad, genealogist and archivist (died 2006)
- Arnholdt Kongsgaard, ski jumper (died 1991)
- Gotfred Kvifte, physicist (died 1997)
- Jens Christian Mellbye, judge (died 1993)
- Gunnar Randers, physicist (died 1992)
- Øistein Strømnæs, intelligence officer (died 1980)
- Anne Margrethe Strømsheim, resistance member (died 2008)

== Deaths ==
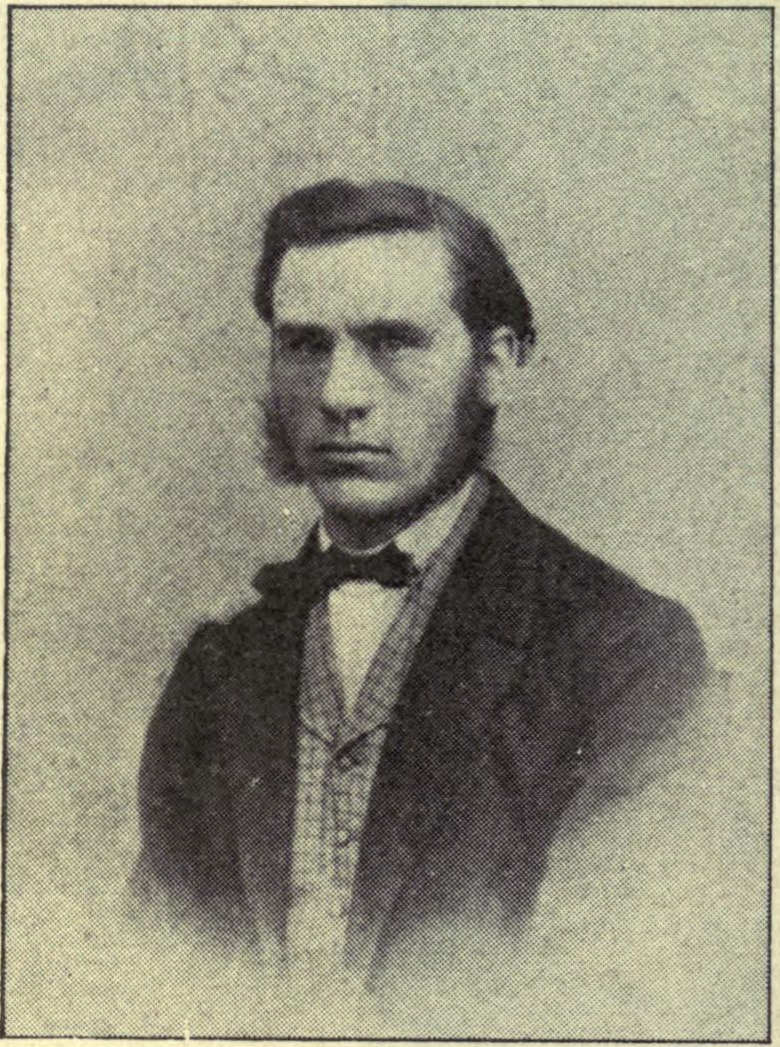
Johannes Skar

- 21 January – Theodor Kittelsen, artist (born 1857)
- 3 February – Johannes Skar, educator and folklorist (b. 1837).
- 19 April – Frederik Collett, painter (born 1839)
- 11 September – Edvard Larsen, triple jumper and Olympic bronze medallist (born 1881)
- 1 October – Kitty Lange Kielland, painter (born 1843)
- 30 October – Johan Christopher Brun, pharmacist and politician (born 1838)

=== Full date unknown ===
- Niels Stockfleth Darre Eckhoff, architect (born 1831)
