= 1988 in Norway =

- Centuries: 18th; 19th; 20th; 21st
- Decades: 1960s; 1970s; 1980s; 1990s; 2000s
- See also: List of years in Norway

Events in the year 1988 in Norway.

== Incumbents ==
- Monarch – Olav V.
- Prime Minister – Gro Harlem Brundtland (Labour Party)

== Events ==
- May 6 – Widerøe Flight 710, a Dash 7, crashes in Torghatten, Norway in heavy fog, killing all 36 passengers in the worst-ever Dash 7 accident.
- February 23 – Edvard Munch's painting "Vampire" was stolen from the Munch Museum in Oslo.
- July – Seal hunting inspector Odd F. Lindberg submits a highly critical report on the conditions of the hunt. With the national and international attention that follows this becomes arguably the biggest news story in Norway this year.
- August – 4 people are killed in the Farsund shooting.
- August 15 – 15 people are killed in the Måbødalen bus accident.
- August 21 – The Stolen Munch painting "Vampire" is retrieved.
- December 5 – TVNorge, the first advertising-supported Norwegian channel, begins its broadcasting.

== Popular culture ==
=== Sports ===
- September 15 – The International Olympic Committee awards the 1994 Winter Olympics in Lillehammer.

=== Music ===
- June 26 – Leonard Cohen concert at Kalvøya, Bærum (Kalvøyafestivalen).

== Notable births ==
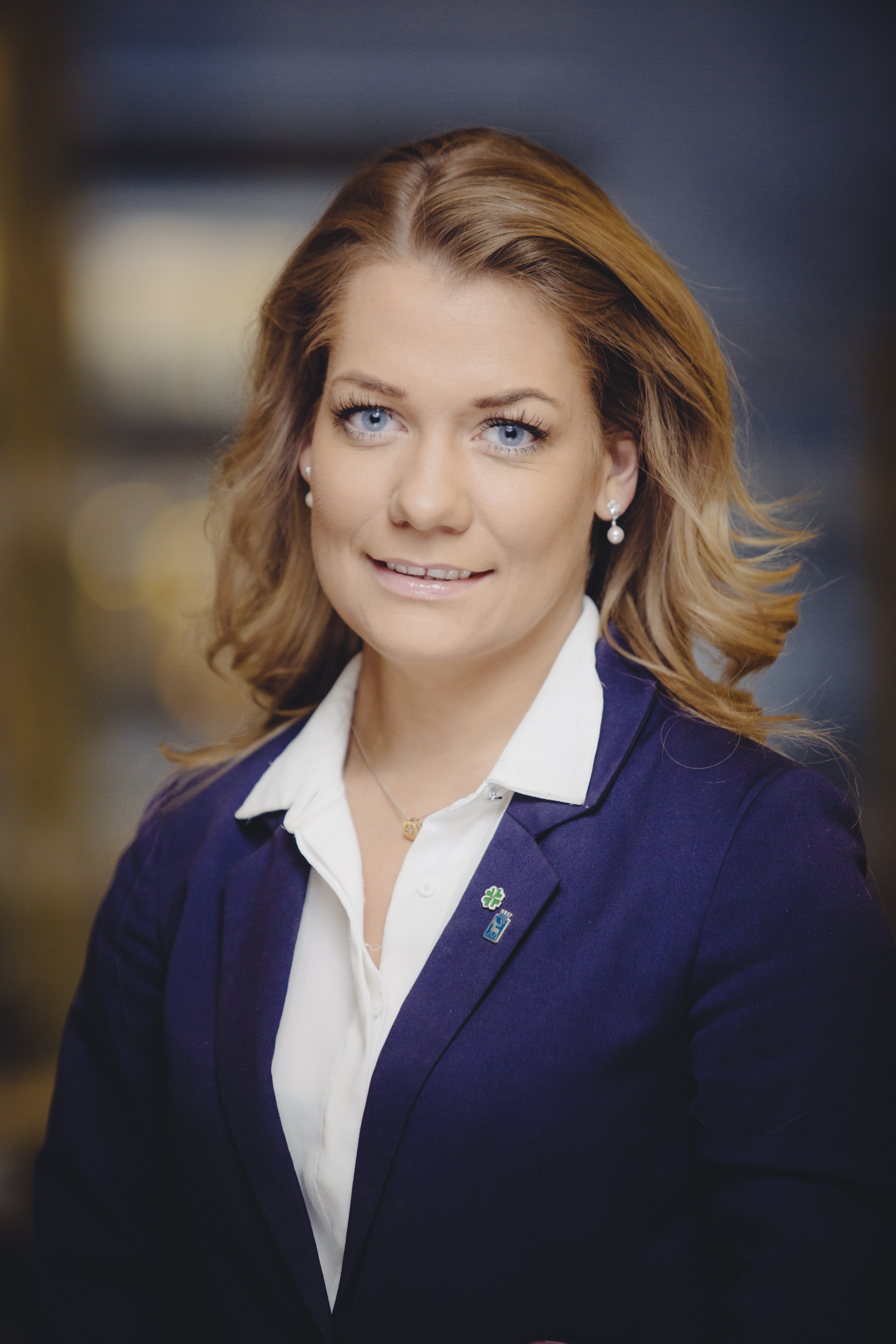
Sandra Borch

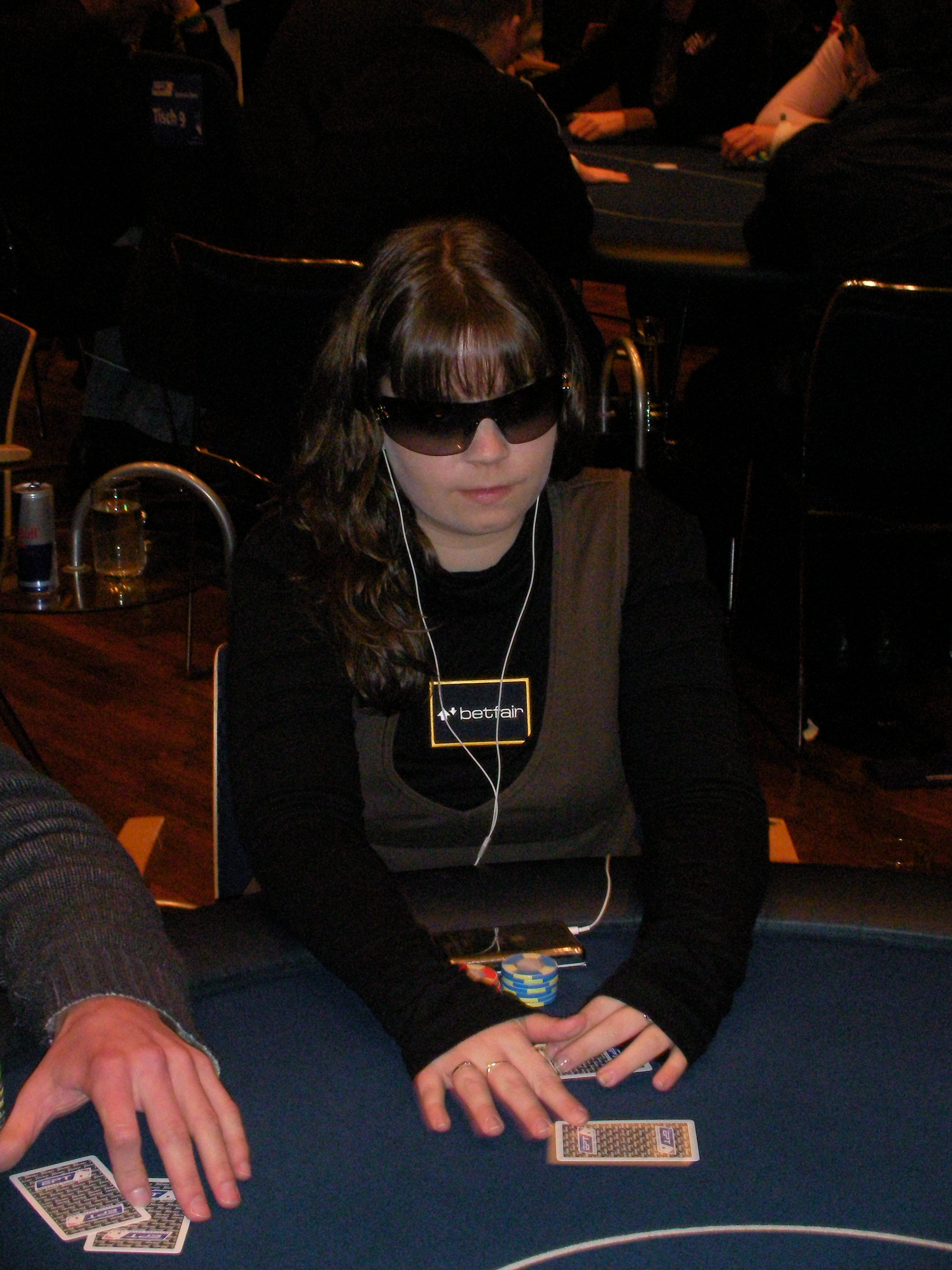
Annette Obrestad

- 7 February – Magnus Jøndal, handball player.
- 7 April – Kristoffer Brun, competitive rower.
- 12 April – Tone Damli Aaberge, singer.
- 17 April – Pernille Wibe, team handball player.
- 18 April – Willfred Nordlund, politician.
- 23 April – Sandra Borch, politician.
- 7 May – David Aleksander Sjølie, guitarist
- 17 August – Natalie Sandtorv, jazz musician
- 18 August – Are Strandli, competitive rower.
- 18 September
  - Magnus Midtbø, rock climber
  - Annette Obrestad, poker player
- 30 September – David Berget, film director and screenwriter
- 4 November – Atle Simonsen, politician.
- 20 November – Veronica Ljosnes, Norwegian circus performer

=== Full date missing ===
- Siri Ulvestad, orienteering competitor.

== Notable deaths ==
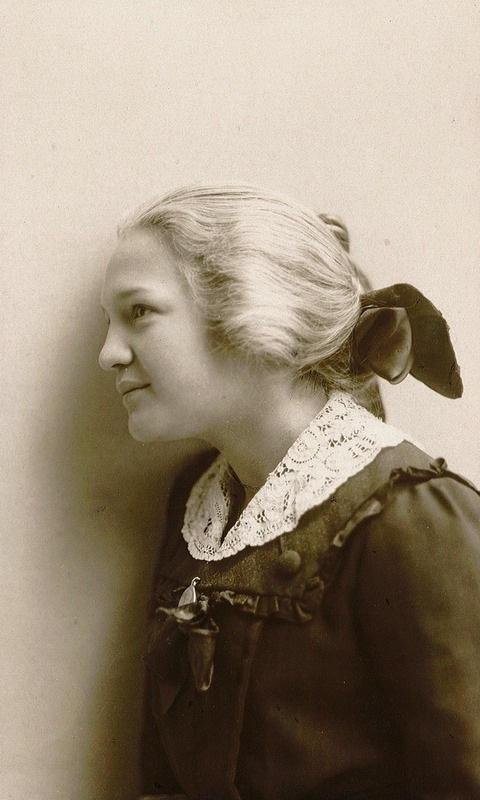
Gerd Grieg

- 1 January – Rolf Presthus, politician and Minister (born 1936)
- 9 January – Peter L. Rypdal, Norwegian fiddler and folk music composer (born 1909)
- 16 January – Inge Einarsen Bartnes, politician (born 1911)
- 21 January – Jørgen Grave, politician (born 1909)
- 18 February – Finn Havrevold, writer and illustrator (born 1905).
- 29 February – Alf Brodal, professor of anatomy (born 1910).
- 29 February – Kaare Wahlberg, ski jumper and Olympic bronze medallist (born 1912)
- 14 March – Johannes Pettersen Løkke, politician (born 1895)
- 17 March – Leif Granli, politician and Minister (born 1909)
- 1 April – Nils Thune, politician (born 1898)
- 17 May – Greta Nissan, actress (born 1906)
- 27 May – Lars Sæter, politician (born 1895)
- 29 May – Henry Johansen, international soccer player (born 1904)
- 8 June – Tollef Landsverk, judge and civil servant (born 1920)
- 21 June – Sverre Riisnæs, jurist, public prosecutor and collaborator (born 1897)
- 28 June – Fridtjof Paulsen, speed skater (born 1895)
- 14 July – Erik Braadland, diplomat and politician (born 1910)
- 16 July – Ole Myrvoll, professor in economy, politician and Minister (born 1911)
- 19 July – Erland Asdahl, politician (born 1921)
- 19 July – Vilhelm Aubert, sociologist (born 1922)
- 13 August – Per Digerud, cyclist (born 1933).
- 19 August – Johan Møller Warmedal, politician (born 1914)
- 23 August – Alf Martinsen, soccer player and Olympic bronze medallist (born 1911)
- 30 September – Sivert Todal, politician (born 1904)
- 18 October – Aasmund Kulien, politician (born 1893)
- 20 November – Nils Sønnevik, politician (born 1911)
- 30 December – Jan Baalsrud, resistance member (born 1917)
- 31 December – Alfred Thommesen, ship owner and politician (born 1914)

=== Full date unknown ===
- Gunnar Andersen, ski jumper and World Champion (born 1909)
- Per Bratland, newspaper editor (born 1907)
- Olav Brunvand, newspaper editor and politician (born 1912)
- Odd Eidem, writer, journalist and literary critic (born 1913)
- Rolf Jørgen Fuglesang, politician and Minister (born 1909)
- Gerd Grieg, actress (born 1895)
- Gudmund Harlem, politician and Minister (born 1917)
- Oskar Skogly, politician and Minister (born 1908)
