= 1989 in Norway =

- Centuries: 18th; 19th; 20th; 21st
- Decades: 1960s; 1970s; 1980s; 1990s; 2000s
- See also: List of years in Norway

Events in the year 1989 in Norway.

== Incumbents ==
- Monarch – Olav V.
- Prime Minister – Gro Harlem Brundtland (Labour Party) until 16 October, Jan P. Syse (Conservative Party)

== Events ==
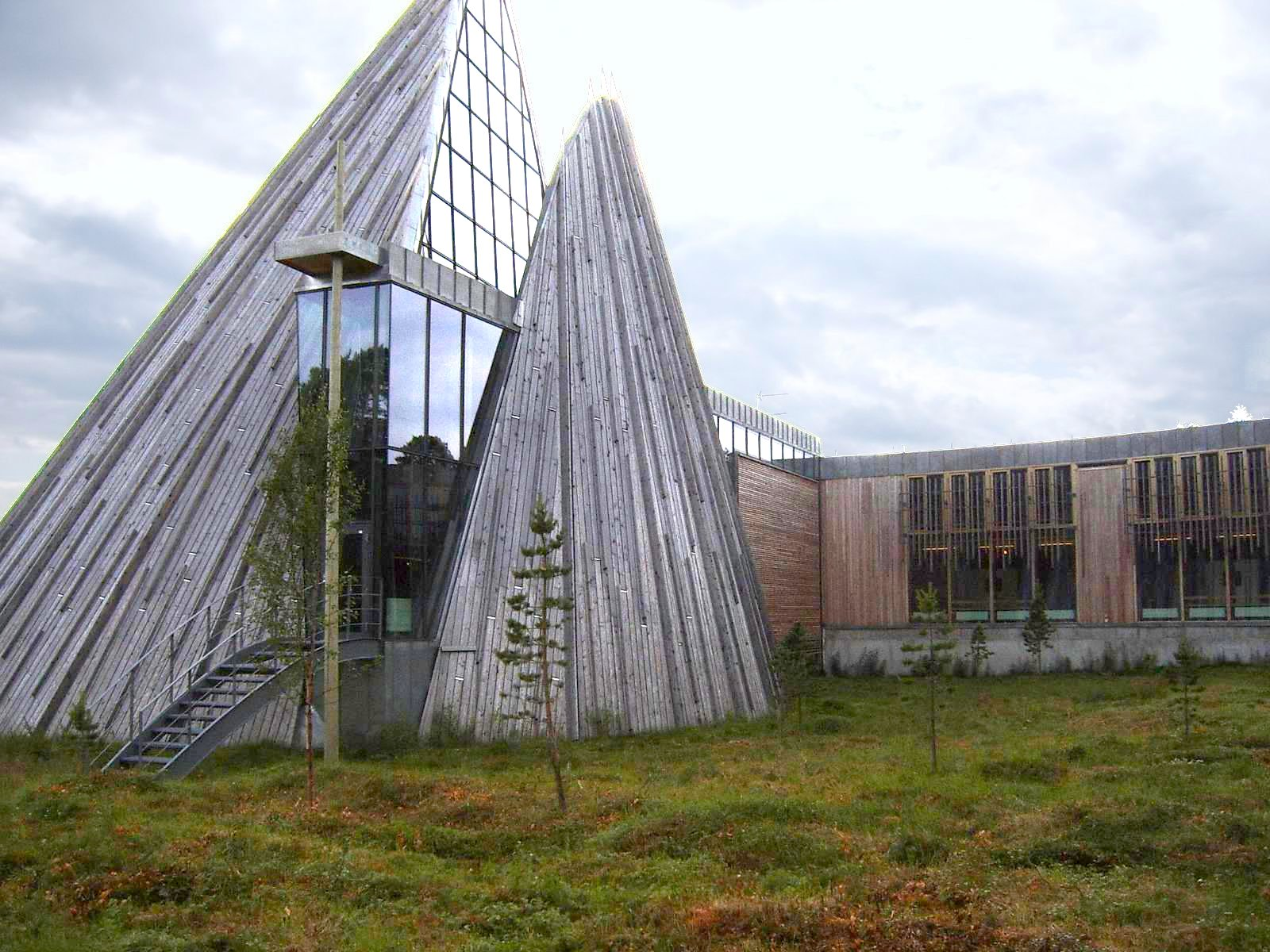
The Sami Parliament of Norway was opened on 11 September.

- 23 January – An offshore earthquake of magnitude 5 takes place in western Norway.
- 30 March – The Oseberg oil field and the first gas pipeline to mainland Norway were opened.
- 1 June – Pope John Paul II visited Norway for the first time. This was the first time a pope has ever visited Norway.
- 9 May – the ban on skateboarding in Norway was lifted, having been in force since 1978.
- 7 July – The opening of the Atlanterhavsveien Road.
- 8 September – A Norwegian passenger plane crashed outside Hirtshals. All the 55 on board died.
- 11 September – The 1989 Parliamentary election takes place.
- 9 October – The opening of the Sami Parliament of Norway.
- 16 October – Gro Harlem Brundtland resigns, with her cabinet, as Prime Minister of Norway for the second time.
- 16 October – Syse's Cabinet was appointed.

== Popular culture ==
=== Sports ===
3 November – Torgeir Bryn becomes the first Norwegian to play in the NBA, when he played 2 minutes for the Los Angeles Clippers against Houston Rockets.

=== Literature ===
- Dag Solstad is awarded the Nordic Council Literature Prize, for Roman 1987.

== Notable births ==
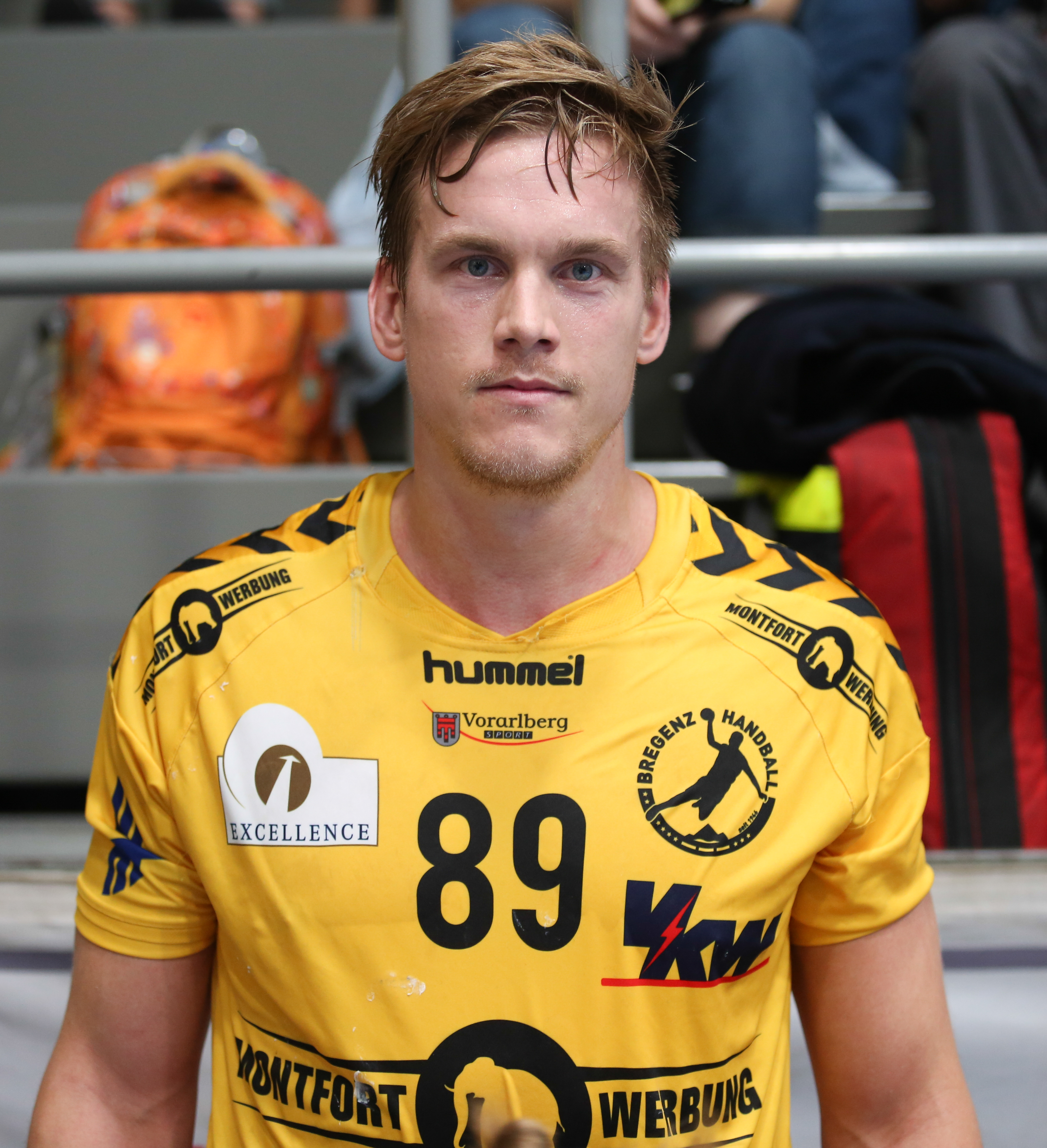
Espen Lie Hansen

- 1 January – Marianne Haukland, politician.
- 29 January – Marita Skammelsrud Lund, Norwegian footballer
- 2 February – Nils Kristen Sandtrøen, politician.
- 10 February – Birgit Skarstein, competitive rower and cross-country skier.
- 19 February – Torbjørn Vereide, politician.
- 1 March – Espen Lie Hansen, handball player.
- 8 March – Emily Stang Sando, handball player.
- 14 May – Petter Kristiansen, singer and songwriter.
- 21 June – Kristina Leganger Iversen, writer and literary scholar.
- 14 July – Jonathan Nordbotten, alpine skier.
- 18 November – Christoffer Rambo, handball player.

== Notable deaths ==
- 9 January – Øivind Jensen, boxer (born 1905)
- 10 January – Kai Fjell, painter, printmaker and scenographer (born 1907)
- 11 January – Thor Myklebust, politician (born 1908)
- 4 February – Johanne Reutz Gjermoe, economist and politician (born 1896).
- 19 February – Sigurd Marius Johansen, politician (born 1906)
- 2 March – Claus Egil Feyling, politician (born 1916)
- 7 April – Per Hysing-Dahl, politician (born 1920)
- 7 May – Anton Rønneberg, writer, theatre critic, dramaturg and theatre director (born 1902).
- 17 May – Hallvard Eika, politician and Minister (born 1920)
- 25 May – Arne Selberg, bridge engineer (born 1910).
- 23 June – Arne Tuft, cross country skier (born 1911)
- 5 August – John Larsen, rifle shooter, Olympic gold medallist and World Champion (born 1913)
- 12 August – Lillebil Ibsen, dancer and actress (born 1899)
- 25 August – Hans Børli, poet and writer (born 1918)
- 16 October – Hans Frette, politician (born 1927)
- 22 October – Bjarne Daniel Solli, politician (born 1910)
- 28 October – Johannes Lislerud, politician (born 1911)
- 30 November – Ingeborg Refling Hagen, author and teacher (born 1895)
- 9 December – Gunnar Bøe, economist and politician (born 1917)
- 30 December – Gunn Vigdis Olsen-Hagen, politician (born 1946)

=== Full date unknown ===
- Rolf Hauge, army officer (born 1915)
- Andreas Holmsen, professor and historian (born 1906)
- Leif Iversen, politician (born 1911)
- Paulus Svendsen, historian of literature and ideas (born 1904)
