= 1984 in Norway =

- Centuries: 18th; 19th; 20th; 21st
- Decades: 1960s; 1970s; 1980s; 1990s; 2000s
- See also: List of years in Norway

Events in the year 1984 in Norway.

== Incumbents ==
- Monarch – Olav V.
- Prime Minister – Kåre Willoch (Conservative Party)

== Events ==
- 20 January – Arne Treholt was arrested on suspicion of spying for the Soviet Union.
- 17 July – The first baby conceived in Norway by artificial insemination is born at the Regional Hospital of Trondheim.
- 1 September – NRK P2 begins its radio broadcasts from Trondheim.

== Popular culture ==
=== Sports ===
- The 1984 Norwegian Football Cup was won by Fredrikstad after beating Viking 3–2 in the final.

=== Music ===
- Live at Jazz Alive, live album by Thorgeir Stubø

=== Literature ===
- Simen Skjønsberg, journalist and writer, is awarded the Gyldendal's Endowment literature prize.

== Notable births ==
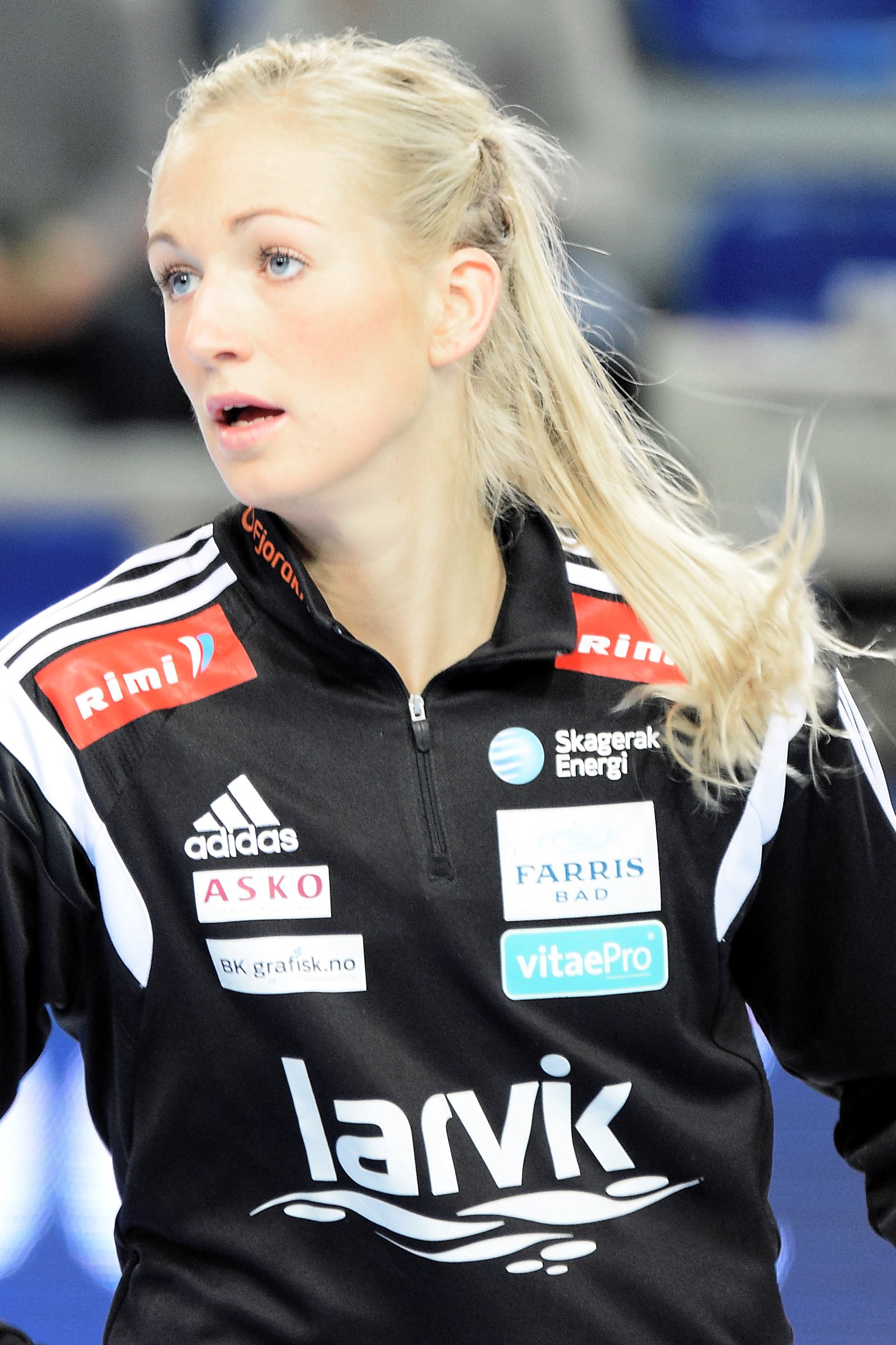
Linn Jørum Sulland, world champion and Olympic champion in handball

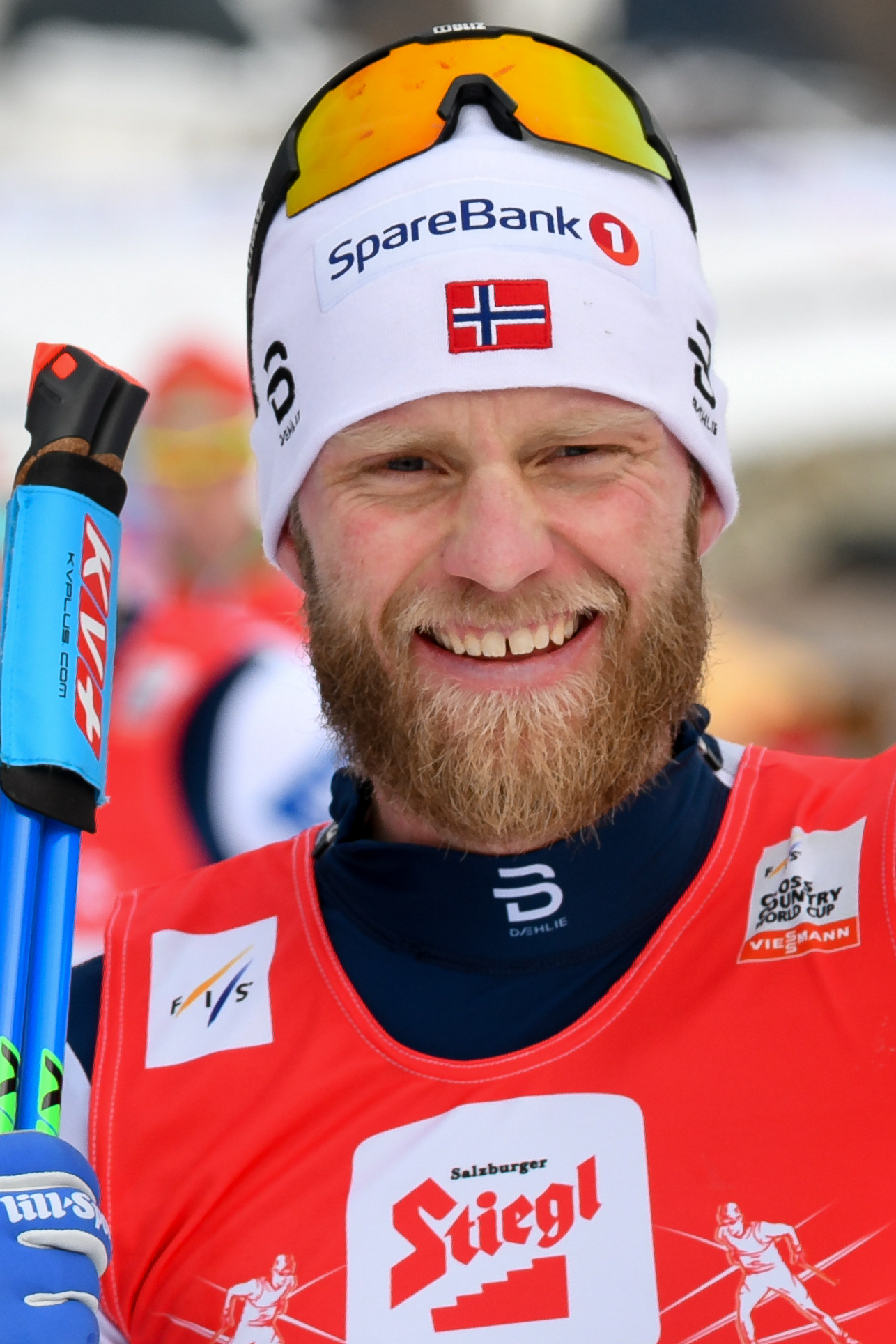
Martin Johnsrud Sundby in 2018

- 3 January – Rannveig Aamodt, rock climber
- 4 January – Trond Bersu, musician
- 16 January – Line Jahr, ski jumper
- 5 February – Trond Olsen, footballer
- 20 February – Mari Kvien Brunvoll, folk and jazz singer
- 26 February – Espen Ruud, footballer
- 4 March – Anders Grøndal, rally driver
- 26 April – Andrea Rydin Berge, jazz musician
- 1 May – Erlend Mamelund, handball player.
- 6 May – Gard Kvale, swimmer.
- 25 May – Marion Raven, singer-songwriter
- 28 May – Ina Wroldsen, singer-songwriter
- 29 May – Jo Berger Myhre, musician
- 13 June – Anna Ljunggren, politician
- 18 June – Frida Ånnevik, jazz singer
- 8 July – Jo Skaansar, jazz musician
- 15 July – Linn Jørum Sulland, handball player.
- 19 July – Lasse Gjertsen, animator, musician, and videographer
- 27 July – Cecilie Myrseth, politician.
- 1 August – Linn-Kristin Riegelhuth Koren, handball player.
- 14 August – Kristoffer Kompen, jazz musician
- 14 August – Marius Arion Nilsen, politician.
- 16 September – Helga Flatland, writer.
- 12 November – Einar Riegelhuth Koren, handball player
- 17 November – Erik Solbakken, television presenter
- 1 September – Odd Arne Brekne, rifle shooter.
- 26 September – Martin Johnsrud Sundby, cross-country skier.
- 26 November – Jørgen Watne Frydnes, political scientist.
- 27 November – Jon Kristian Fjellestad, organist and composer
- 28 November – Richard Colman, Australian Paralympic athlete (born in Stavanger, Norway)
- 27 December – Jørgen Mathisen, jazz musician

== Notable deaths ==
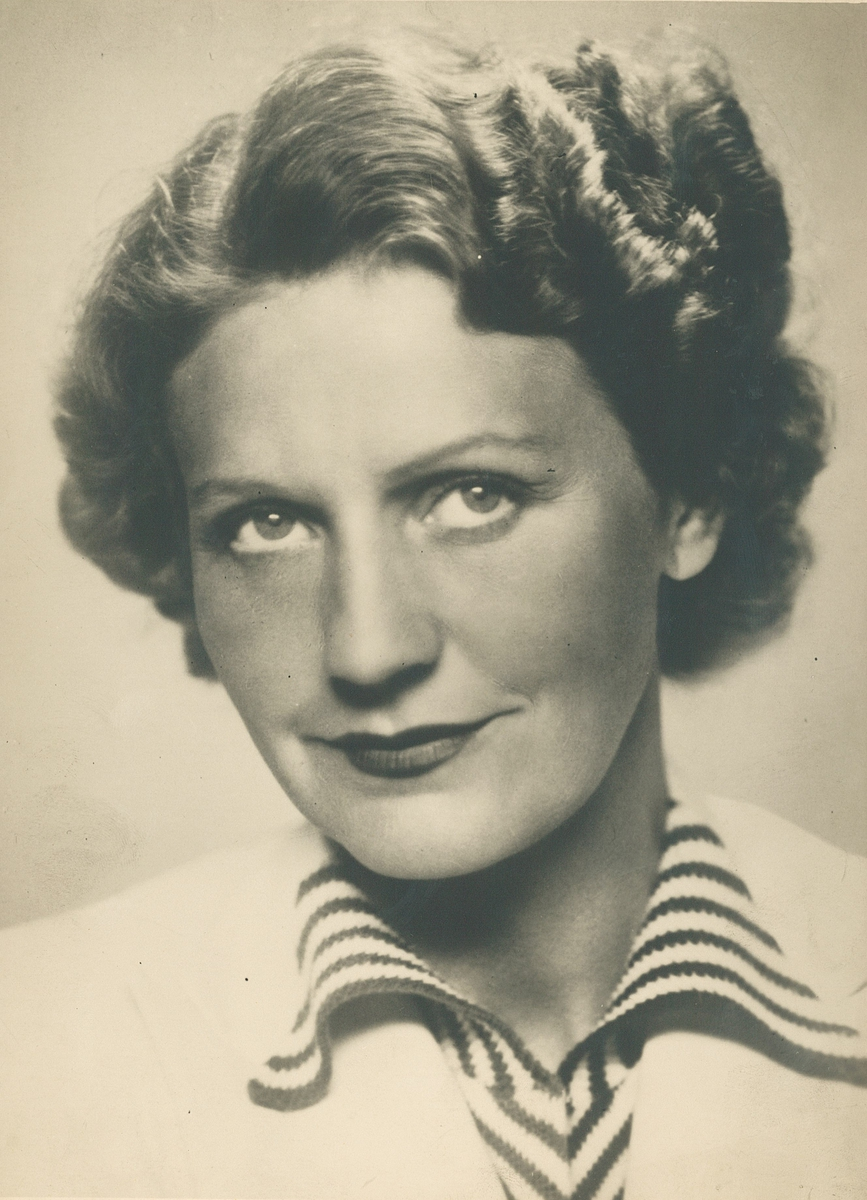
Lillemor von Hanno

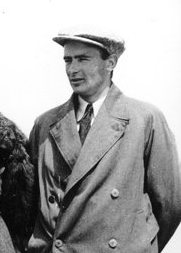
Trygve Bratteli

- 10 January – Thoralf Strømstad, Nordic skier and Olympic silver medallist (born 1897)
- 20 January – Hagbart Haakonsen, cross country skier (born 1895)
- 24 January – Egil Halmøy, politician (born 1901)
- 1 February – Hans Vinjarengen, skier, Olympic silver medallist and World Champion (born 1905)
- 13 February – Fartein Valen-Sendstad, historian and museologist (born 1918).
- 4 March – Odd Bang-Hansen, novelist and children's writer (born 1908)
- 9 March – Kristian Johansson, ski jumper (born 1907)
- 25 March – Martin Stokken, cross country skier and Olympic silver medallist, athlete (born 1923)
- 5 April – Lillemor von Hanno, actress and writer (born 1900).
- 14 April – Anders Haugen, ski jumper (born 1888)
- 22 April – Erling Nilsen, boxer and Olympic bronze medallist (born 1910).
- 23 April – Ivar Johansen, bobsledder (born 1910).
- 26 April – Helge Løvland, decathlete and Olympic gold medallist (born 1890)
- 21 May – Randi Bakke, pair skater (born 1904).
- 6 July – Johan Lauritz Eidem, politician (born 1891)
- 29 July – Erling Johan Vindenes, politician (born 1900)
- 24 August – John Johnsen, swimmer (born 1892)
- 4 September – Ragna Johanne Forsberg, politician (born 1908)
- 4 September – Bjarne Johnsen, gymnast and Olympic gold medallist (born 1892)
- 6 September – Leiv Kreyberg, pathologist (born 1896).
- 9 September – Gunnar Jamvold, sailor and Olympic gold medallist (born 1896)
- 20 September – Frithjof Bettum, jurist and politician (born 1900)
- 22 October – Sverre Østbye, Nordic skier (born 1889)
- 23 October – Hans Karolus Ommedal, politician (born 1901)
- 2 November – Ernst Føyn, chemist and oceanographer (born 1904).
- 4 November – Lars Amandus Aasgard, politician (born 1907)
- 20 November – Trygve Bratteli, politician and twice Prime Minister of Norway (born 1910).
- 22 November – Gerd Nyquist, writer (born 1913).

=== Full date missing ===
- Henrik Edland, veterinarian (born 1905)
- Rolf Gammleng, violinist and organizational leader (born 1898).
- Magnhild Haalke, novelist (born 1885)
- Mikkel Ødelien, soil researcher (born 1893)
- Petter Pettersson, Jr., politician (born 1911)
- August Schou, historian (born 1903)
- Reidar Fauske Sognnaes, Dean of Harvard School of Dental Medicine, forensic scientist (born 1911)
