= Hellebust =

Hellebust is a surname. Notable people with the surname include:

- Kine Hellebust (born 1954), Norwegian singer, actress, children's writer, non-fiction writer, and playwright
- Magnar Hellebust (1914–2008), Norwegian politician
