= Hildrum =

Hildrum is a Norwegian surname. Notable people with the surname include:

- Alf Hildrum (born 1948), Norwegian media executive and politician
- Einar Hildrum (1902–1991), Norwegian horticulturalist
- Eva Hildrum (born 1948), Norwegian civil servant
