= 1987 in Norway =

- Centuries: 18th; 19th; 20th; 21st
- Decades: 1960s; 1970s; 1980s; 1990s; 2000s
- See also: List of years in Norway

Events in the year 1987 in Norway.

== Incumbents ==
- Monarch – Olav V.
- Prime Minister – Gro Harlem Brundtland (Labour Party)

== Events ==
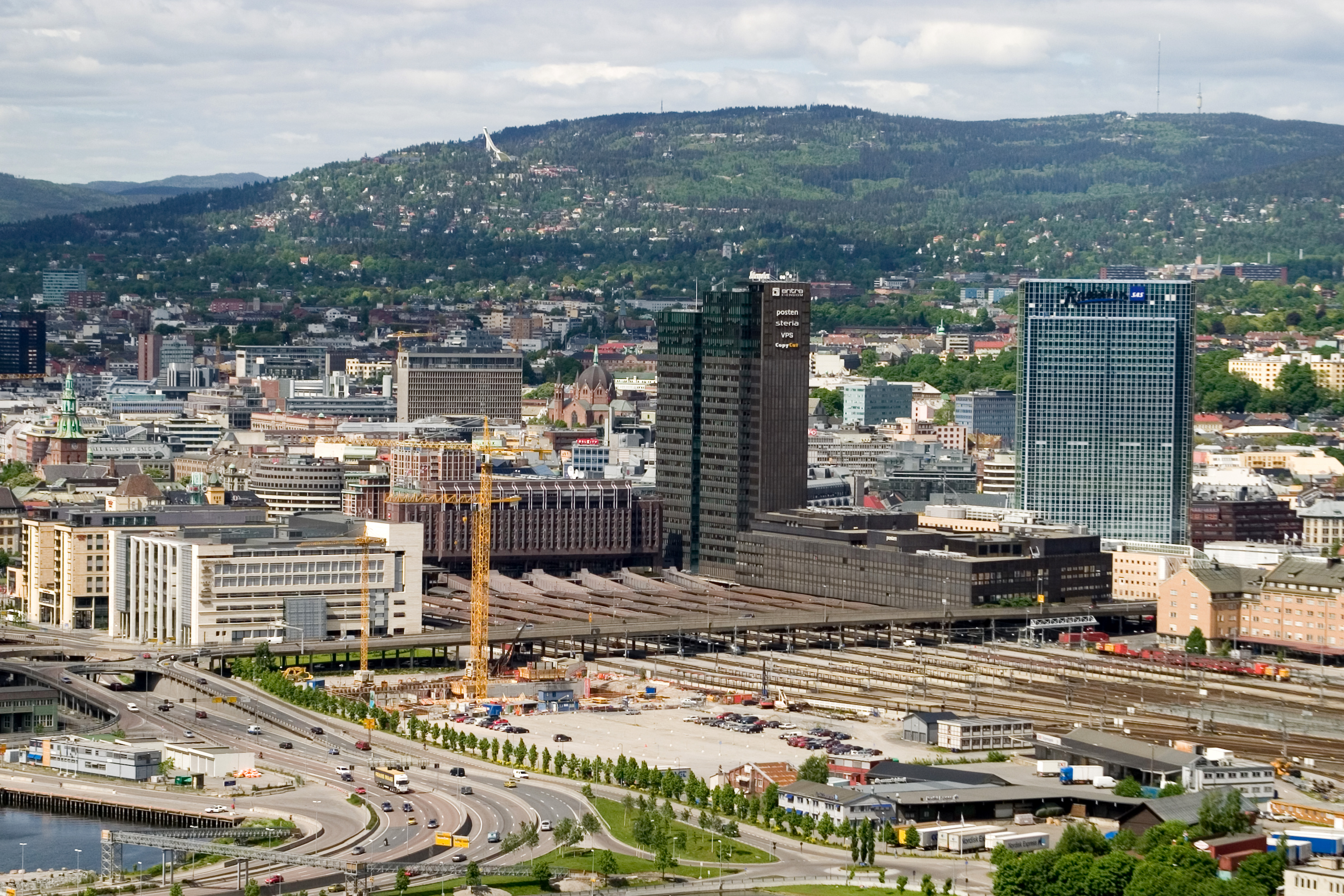
Oslo Central Station (Oslo S) opens on 12 February

- 12 February – Oslo Central Station (Oslo S) opens.
- August – the Mosjøen Airport was opened.
- Municipal and county elections are held throughout the country.
- The Sami act was established to protect the rights of Sami people.

== Popular culture ==
=== Sports ===
- The 1987 World Powerlifting Championships are held in Fredrikstad.
- 4 September – Ingrid Kristiansen wins the 10,000 metres race at the 1987 World Championships in Athletics.

=== Literature ===
- Herbjørg Wassmo is awarded the Nordic Council Literature Prize, for Hudløs himmel.

== Notable births ==
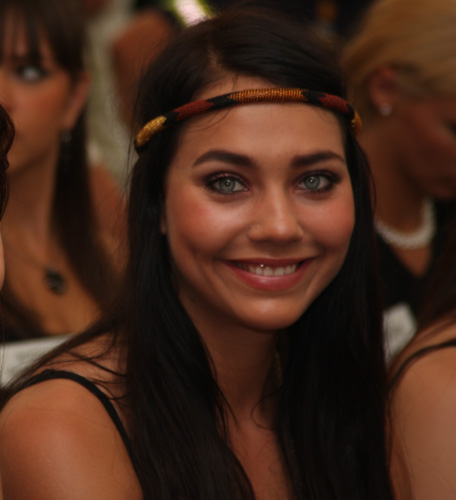
Lene Egeli

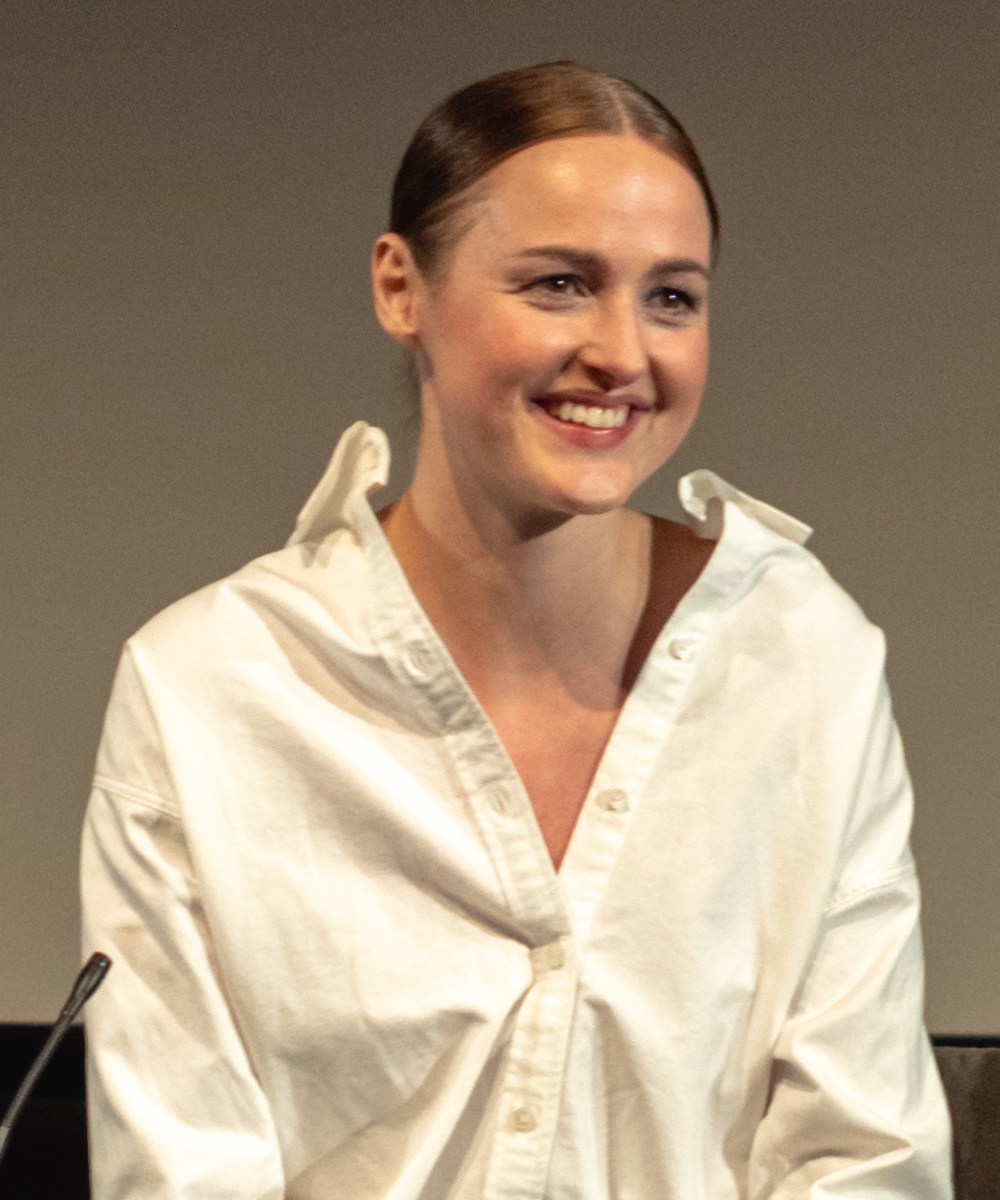
Renate Reinsve

- 16 January – Hans Norbye, footballer
- 22 January – Astrid Uhrenholdt Jacobsen, cross-country skier
- 26 January – Jan Tømmernes, footballer
- 2 February – Håvard Bøkko, speed skater
- 18 February – Torstein Horgmo, snowboarder.
- 26 February – Ole Christoffer Heieren Hansen, footballer
- 11 March – Morten Hæstad, footballer
- 17 March – Jesper Mathisen, footballer and football commentator
- 19 March – Steinar Strømnes, footballer
- 24 March – Michael Jamtfall, footballer
- 27 March – Lene Egeli, model
- 21 April – Jo Nymo Matland, footballer
- 12 May – Thor Jørgen Spurkeland, footballer
- 17 May – Edvald Boasson Hagen, road racing cyclist
- 24 May – Rune Ertsås, footballer
- 7 June – Jørgen Horn, footballer
- 11 June – Didrik Solli-Tangen, singer.
- 16 June – Per Ciljan Skjelbred, footballer
- 30 June – Thomas Braaten and Vegard Braaten, footballers
- 5 July – Alexander Kristoff, road racing cyclist
- 10 July – Kari Elisabeth Kaski, politician.
- 31 July – Amrita Acharia, actress
- 3 August – Alexander Søderlund, footballer
- 18 August – Siri Tollerød, model
- 31 August – Andreas Lie, footballer
- 1 September – Mats Zuccarello, ice hockey player
- 14 September – Terje Reinertsen, footballer
- 16 September – Erik Mellevold Bråthen, footballer
- 22 September – Tom Hilde, ski jumper
- 11 October – Mads Østberg, rally driver
- 2 October – Ole Jørgen Halvorsen, footballer
- 21 October – Tonje Brenna, politician.
- 18 November – Erik Midtgarden, footballer
- 24 November – Renate Reinsve, actress.

Date missing

- Oda Malmin, novelist
- Thea Olsen, television presenter

== Notable deaths ==
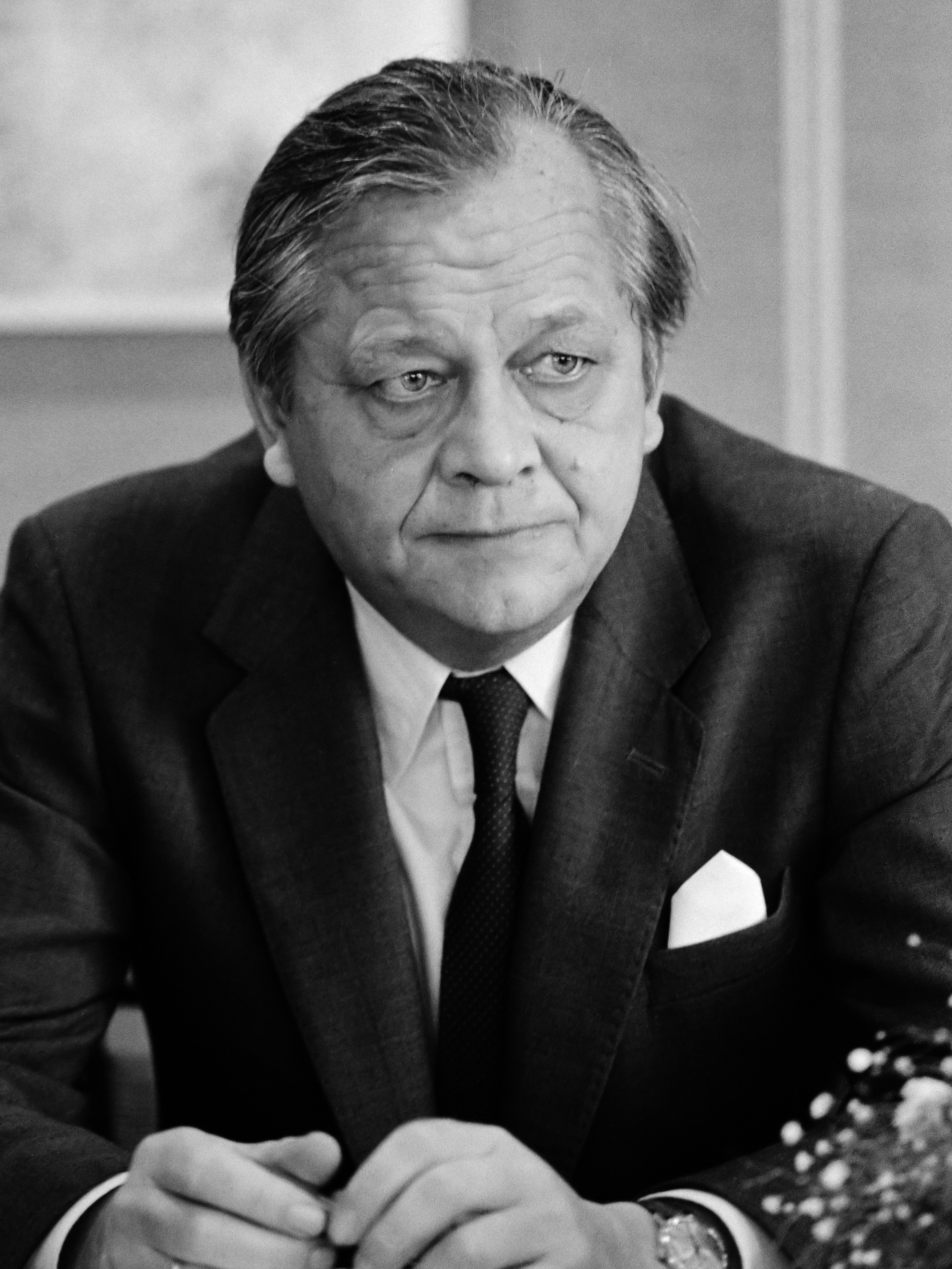
Knut Frydenlund, Minister of Foreign Affairs

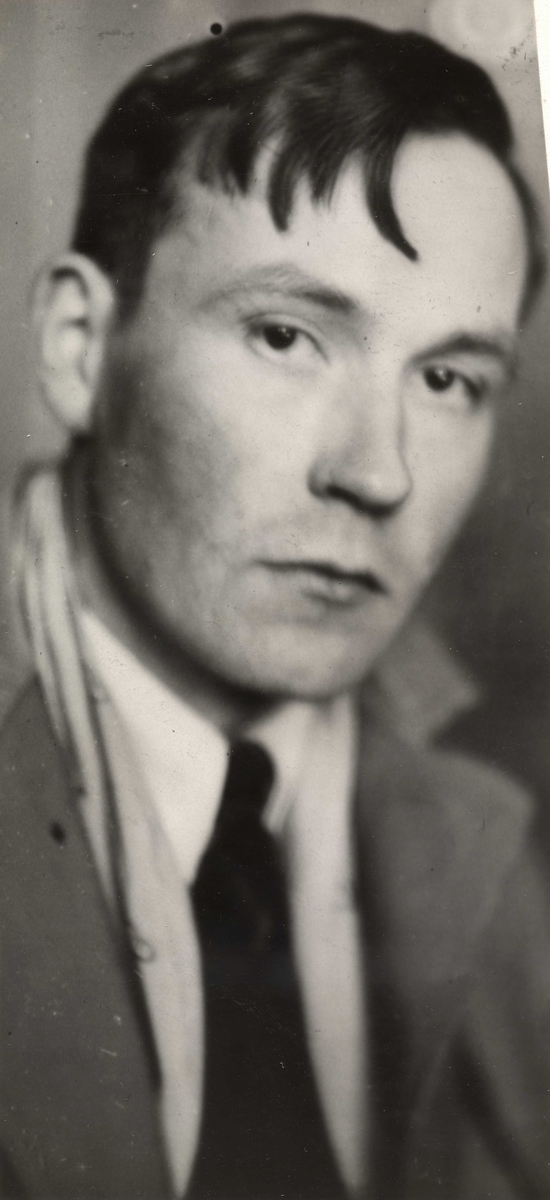
Ståle Kyllingstad

- 5 January – Herman Smith-Johannsen, cross-country skier and supercentenarian (born 1875)
- 20 January – Tove Pihl, educator and politician (born 1924)
- 14 February – Einar Wøhni, politician (born 1920)
- 26 February – Leif Efskind, surgeon (born 1904).
- 26 February – Knut Frydenlund, politician and Minister (born 1927)
- 1 March – Reidar Andreas Lyseth, politician (born 1904)
- 3 March – Trygve Owren, politician (born 1912)
- 29 April – Ludvig Olai Botnen, politician (born 1910).
- 13 May – Signe Amundsen, operatic soprano (born 1899)
- 20 May – Otto Carlmar, film producer, writer and actor (born 1902)
- 31 May – Kolbein Lauring, WWII resistance member (born 1914)
- 16 June – Aage Myhrvold, cyclist (born 1918).
- 20 June – Knut Hoem, politician and Minister (born 1924)
- 30 June – Torborg Nedreaas, author (born 1906)
- 30 June – Thor Thorvaldsen, sailor and twice Olympic gold medallist (born 1904)
- 31 July – Sverre Moen, politician (born 1921)
- 22 August – Arne Brustad, international soccer player and Olympic bronze medallist (born 1912)
- 28 August – Gunnar Berg, a national director of the Boy Scouts of America (born 1897)
- 12 September – Bjørn Erling Ytterhorn, politician (born 1923)
- 19 September – Einar Gerhardsen, politician (born 1897)
- 6 October – Roald Jensen, international soccer player (born 1943)
- 26 October – Bjørge Lillelien, sports journalist and commentator (born 1927)
- 4 November – Tor Halvorsen, trade unionist, politician and Minister (born 1930)
- 26 November – Ståle Kyllingstad, sculptor (born 1903).
- 7 December – Petter Jacob Semb Meyer, judge and politician (born 1902).
- 19 December – Ruth Krefting, painter and playwright (born 1900).

=== Full date unknown ===
- Thomas Offenberg Backer, engineer (born 1892)
- Reidar Carlsen, politician and Minister (born 1908)
- Finn Isaksen, politician and Minister (born 1924)
- Aage Samuelsen, evangelist, singer and composer (born 1919)
- Harald Wergeland, physicist (born 1912)
