= 1991 in Norway =

- Centuries: 18th; 19th; 20th; 21st
- Decades: 1970s; 1980s; 1990s; 2000s; 2010s
- See also: List of years in Norway

Events in the year 1991 in Norway.

== Incumbents ==
- Monarch: Olav V (until January 17), then Harald V.
- Regent: Harald (until January 17)
- Prime Minister: Gro Harlem Brundtland (Labour Party)

== Events ==
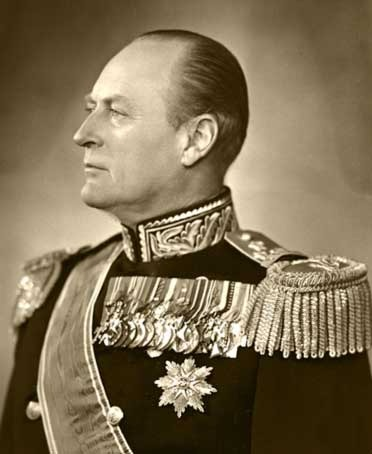
Olav V of Norway

- 17 January – Olav V, King of Norway dies
- 3 September – The siblings Aase Helene and Arne Odvar Nordby, aged 78 and 74, were murdered and then were robbed in their home in Tistedalen.
- Rjukanbanen railway line closes (opened in 1909).
- Municipal and county elections are held throughout the country.

== Popular culture ==
=== Sports ===
The World Junior Alpine Skiing Championships 1991 are held in Geilo and Hemsedal.

=== Music ===
1991 in Norway was important because it was the year in which Norwegian music, particularly rock and pop, made a commercial breakthrough. This was due to the introduction of a new black metal genre. Fortunately, as well as being the year in which there were important achievements in both folk and jazz genres all music genres were all helped along by both domestic awards as well as their having been included in international forums

== Notable births ==
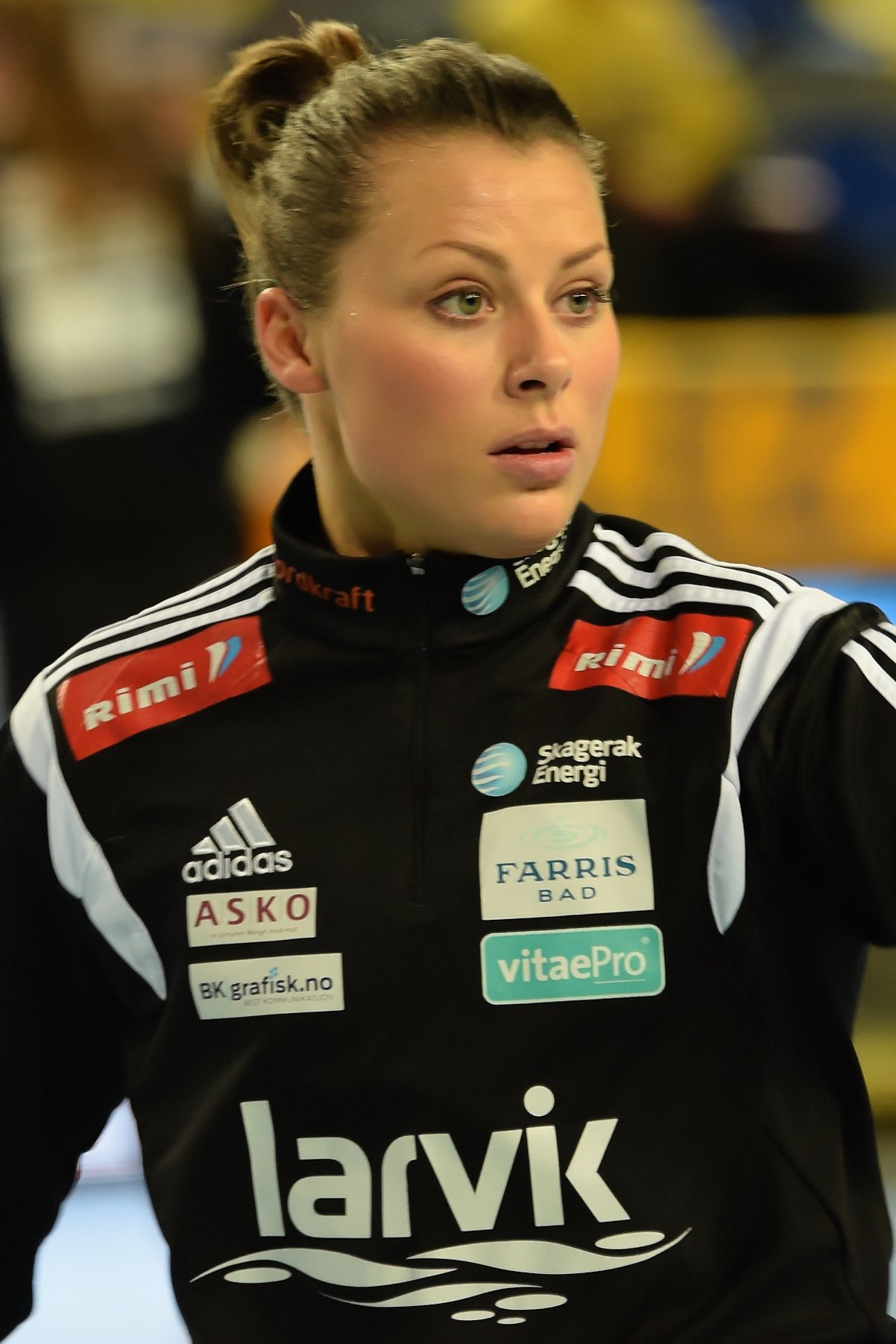
Nora Mørk

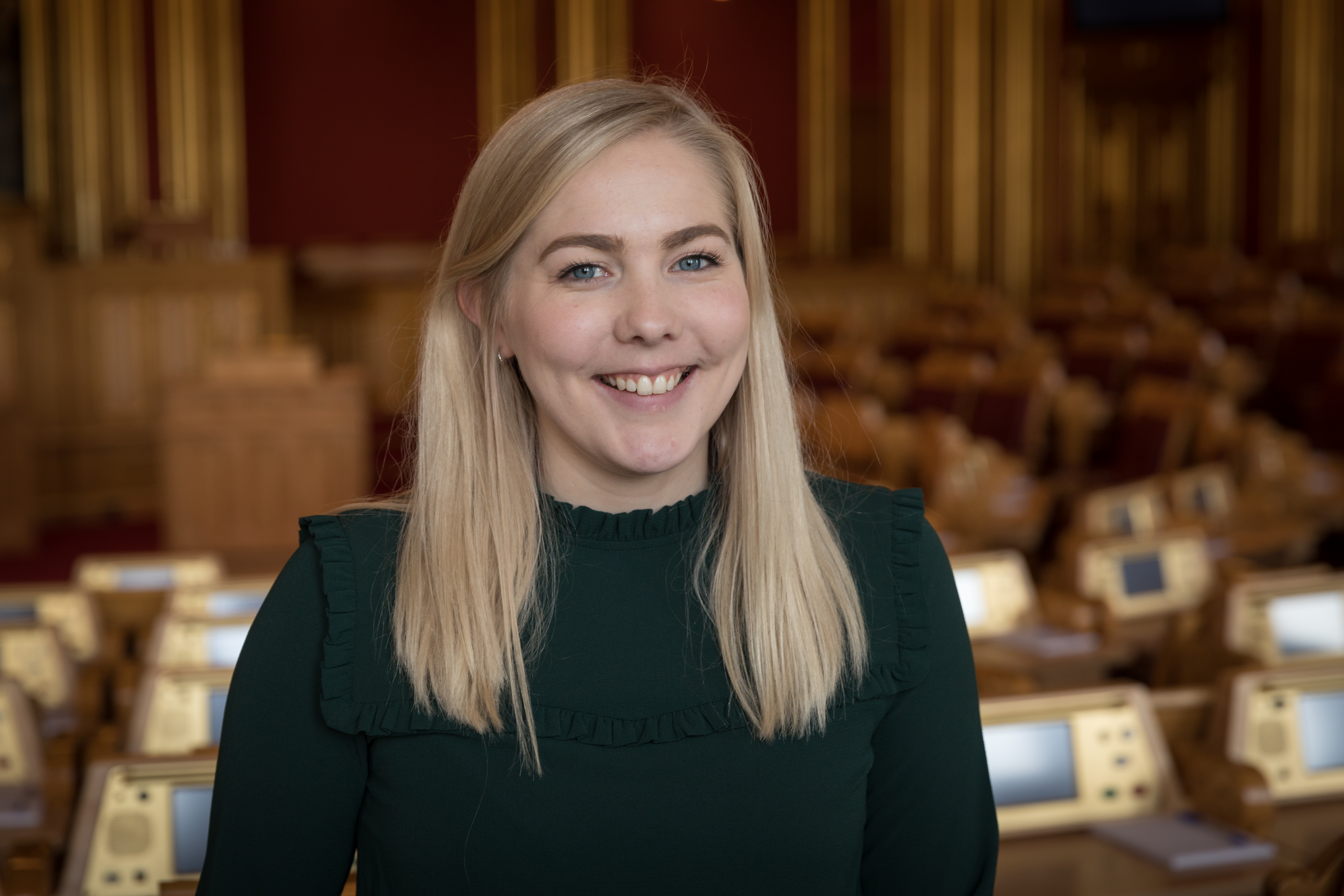
Mari Holm Lønseth

- 12 January – Sondre Nordstad Moen, long-distance runner.
- 12 February – Ragnhild Haga, cross-country skier.
- 15 February – Kari Brattset, handball player.
- 17 March – Øystein Mathisen, politician.
- 4 April – Martine Ek Hagen, cross-country skier.
- 5 April – Nora Mørk, handball player.
- 5 April – Thea Mørk, handball player.
- 29 June – Helene Næss, competitive sailor.
- 13 July – Sebastian Foss Solevåg, alpine skier.
- 25 July – Amanda Kurtović, handball player.
- 29 August – Mari Holm Lønseth, politician.
- 25 September – Stine Bredal Oftedal, handball player.
- 19 November – Ingvild Wetrhus Thorsvik, politician.
- 31 December – Sandra Bruflot, politician.

== Notable deaths ==
=== January to March ===
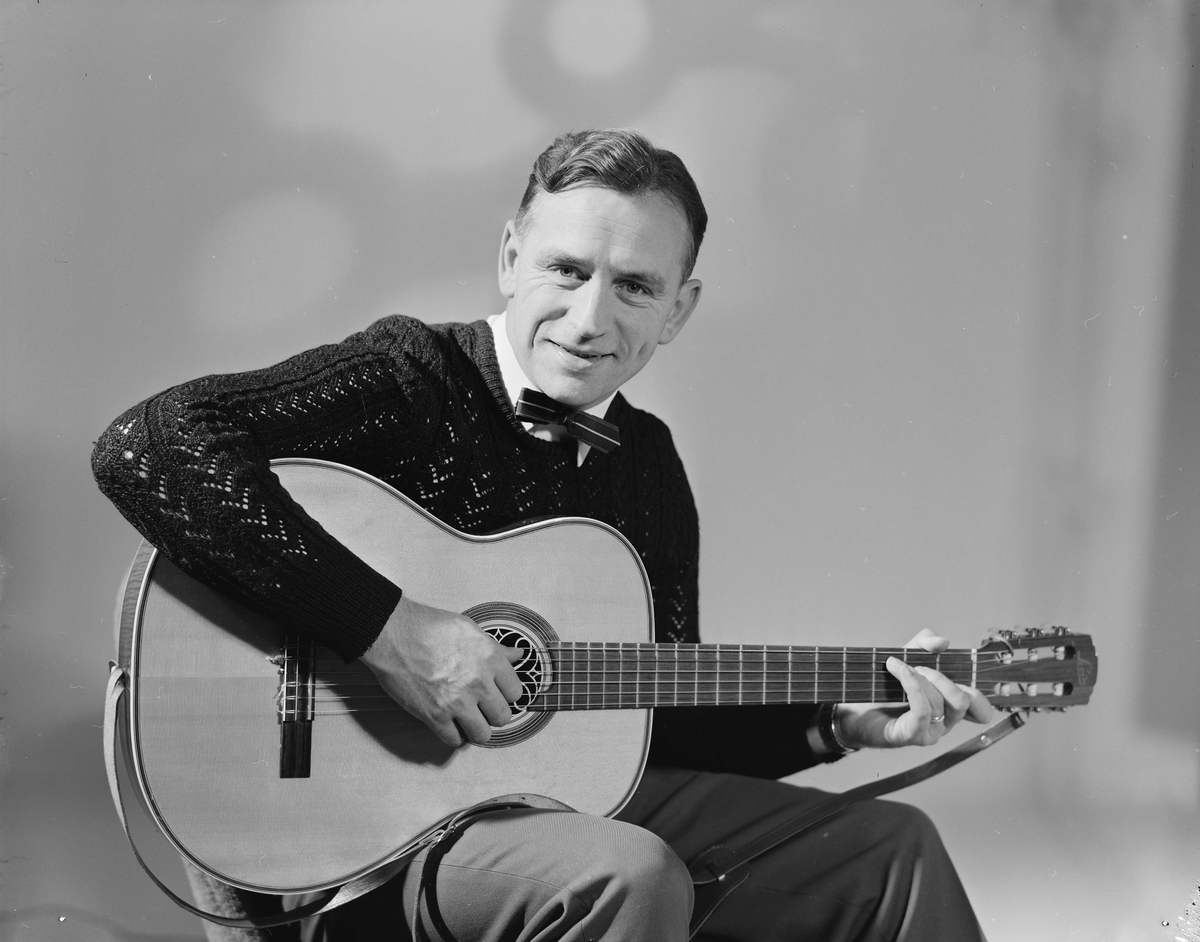
Ingebrigt Davik

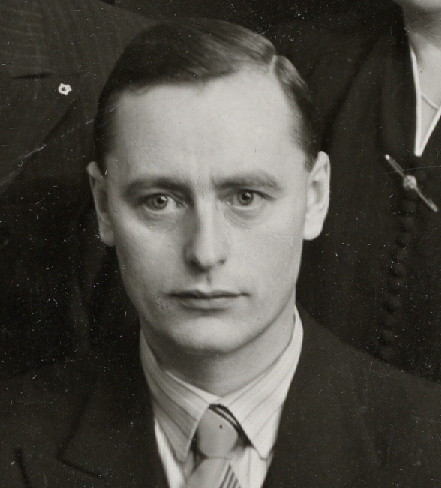
O. C. Gundersen

- 12 January – Kåre Berven Fjeldsaa, ceramics designer (born 1918)
- 17 January
  - Olav V of Norway, King of Norway (born 1903)
  - Alf Sanengen, resistance member, chemist, research administrator (born 1913)
- 22 January – Arnholdt Kongsgård, ski jumper (born 1914)
- 23 January – Ole Peder Arvesen, engineer and mathematician (born 1895).
- 25 January – Per Gjelten, Nordic skier (born 1927).
- 29 January – Ingebrigt Davik, singer and songwriter (born 1925).
- 31 January –
  - Einar Hildrum, landscape architect and magazine editor (born 1902)
  - Åge Rønning, writer and journalist (born 1925).
- 5 February
  - Torgeir Andersen, politician (born 1916)
  - Tora Øyna, politician (born 1898)
- 7 February – Arne Randers Heen, mountain climber (born 1905).
- 21 February – Oscar Christian Gundersen, politician (born 1908)
- 25 February – Sverre Hansen, long jumper (born 1899)

=== April to June ===
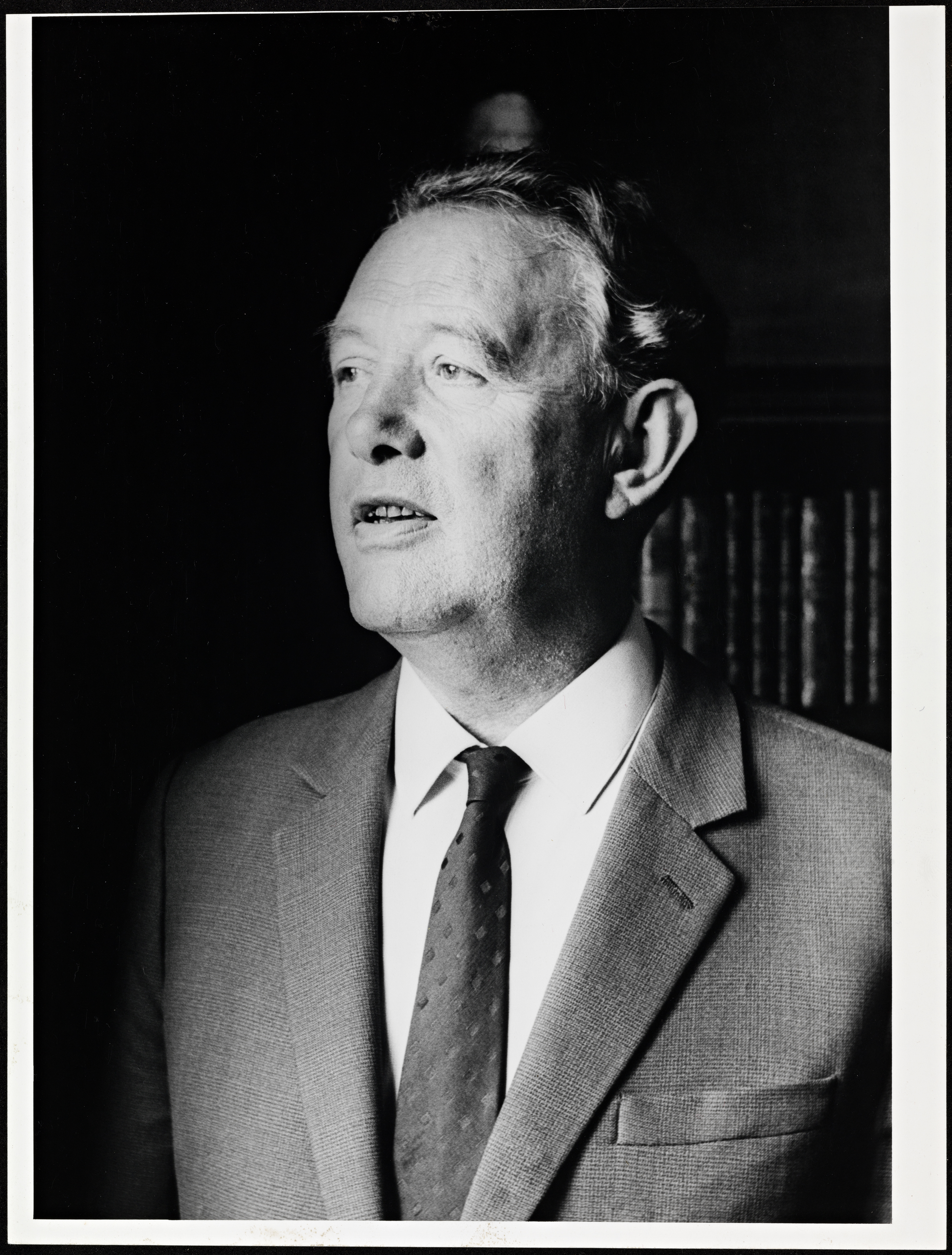
Harald L. Tveterås

- 8 April – Pelle "Dead" Ohlin, vocalist (born 1969)
- 10 April – Otto Berg, long jumper (born 1906)
- 11 April – Dag Ramsøy Bryn, diplomat and politician (born 1909)
- 17 April – Gulborg Nygaard, politician (born 1902)
- 21 April – Andreas Frivåg, politician (born 1925)
- 24 April – Haakon Tranberg, sprinter (born 1917)
- 2 May – Jens Haugland, politician (born 1910)
- 3 May – Sverre Heiberg, photographer (born 1912).
- 17 May – Lars L'Abée-Lund, police (born 1910).
- 10 June – Anders Sæterøy, politician (born 1901)
- 30 June – Harald L. Tveterås, librarian (born 1904).

=== July to September ===
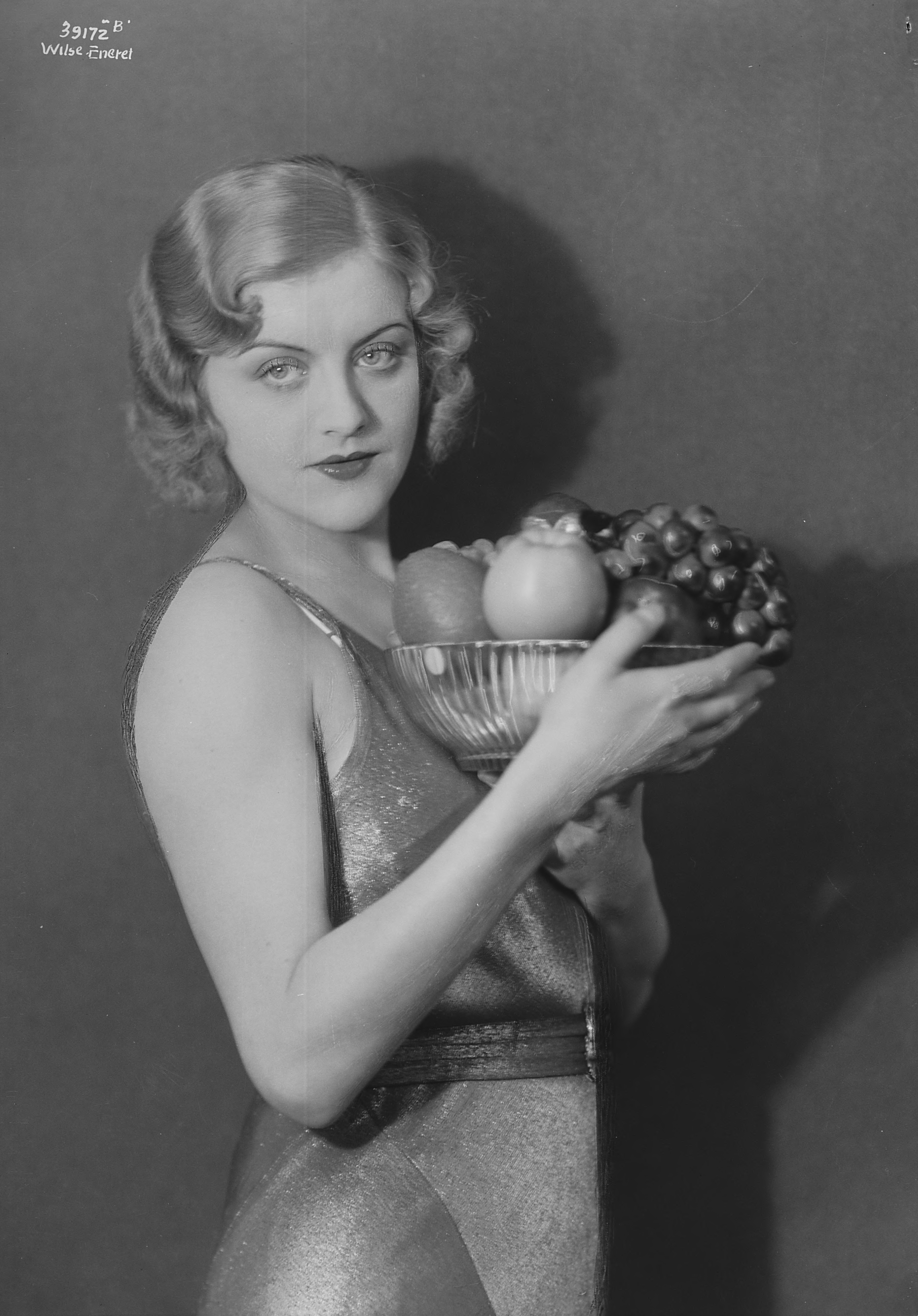
Aase Bye

- 10 July – Aase Bye, actress (born 1904)
- 25 July – Per Almaas, politician (born 1898)
- 28 July – Lars Tangvik, politician (born 1902)
- 2 August – Alf Martin Bjørnø, politician (born 1923)
- 3 August – Olaf Aarvold, priest and politician (born 1899)
- 6 August – Georg Krog, speed skater and Olympic silver medallist (born 1915)
- 24 August – Åge Ramberg, politician (born 1921)
- 7 September – Haakon Pedersen, speed skater (born 1906)
- 8 September – Odd Bull, air force officer, Chief of Air Staff (born 1907)

=== October to December ===
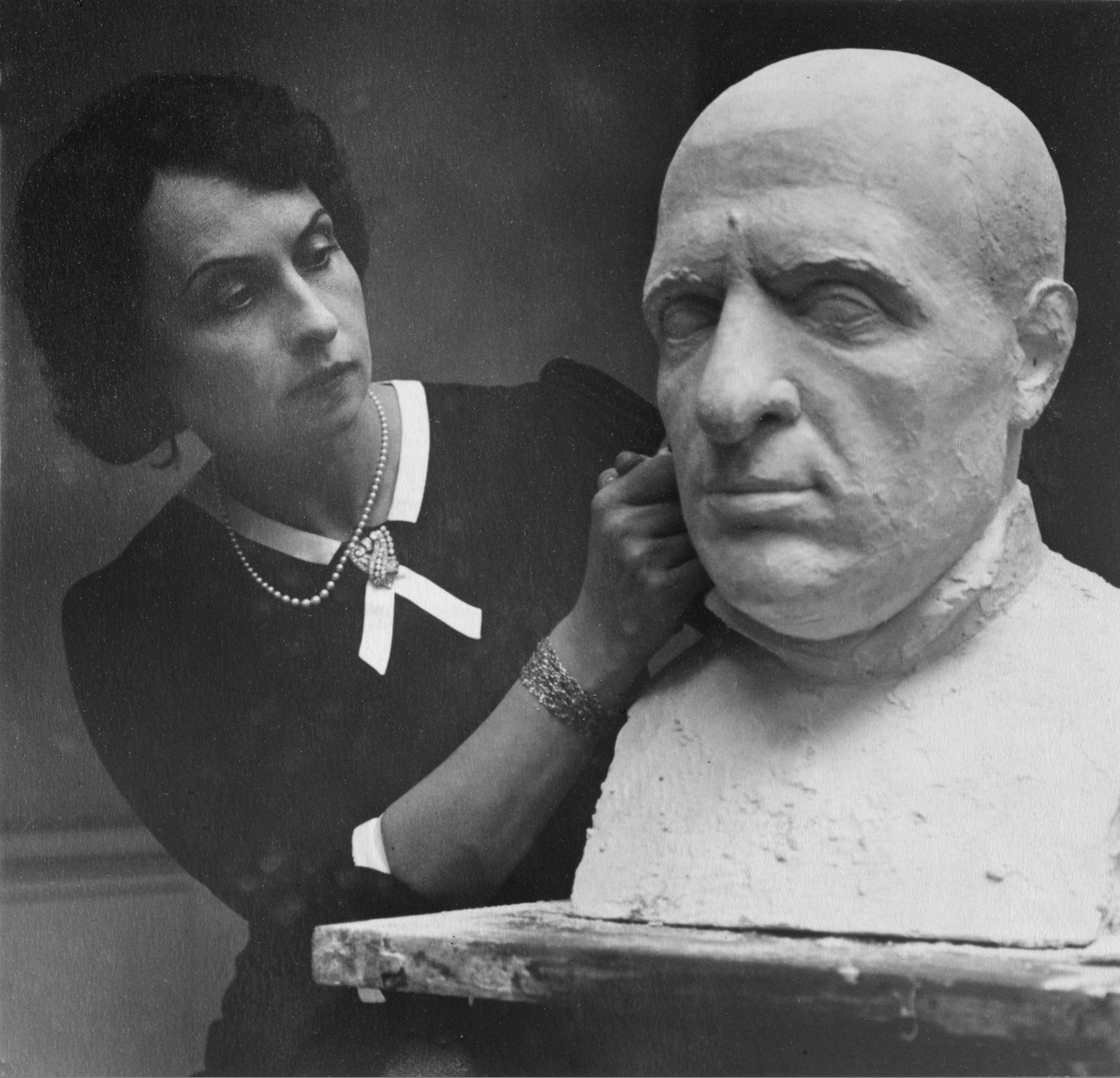
Sigri Welhaven

- 17 October – Håkon Johnsen, politician (born 1914)
- 18 October – Gunnar Sønstevold, composer (born 1912)
- 29 October – Johan Støa, multi-sportsman (born 1900)
- 3 November – Finn Alnæs, novelist (born 1932).
- 20 November – Kåre Kivijärvi, photographer (born 1938)
- 15 December – Reidar Andersen, ski jumper (born 1911)
- 20 December – Sigri Welhaven, sculptor (born 1894).
- 27 December – Arne Holst, bobsledder (born 1904)
- 31 December – Elise Fliflet, politician (born 1893)

=== Full date unknown ===
- Eigil Gullvåg, newspaper editor and politician (born 1921)
- Olav Harald Jensen, economist (born 1917)
- Selmer Nilsen, fisherman who spied for the KGB (born 1931)
