= 1986 in Norway =

- Centuries: 18th; 19th; 20th; 21st
- Decades: 1960s; 1970s; 1980s; 1990s; 2000s
- See also: List of years in Norway

Events in the year 1986 in Norway.

== Incumbents ==
- Monarch – Olav V.
- Prime Minister – Kåre Willoch (Conservative Party) until 9 May, Gro Harlem Brundtland (Labour Party)

== Events ==
- 5 March – Eleven Norwegian soldiers are killed in an avalanche near Narvik in Nordland County.
- 3 May – Eurovision Song Contest 1986 is held in Bergen.
- 9 May – Gro Harlem Brundtland becomes Prime Minister of Norway for the second time.
- 9 May – Brundtland's Second Cabinet was appointed.
- Norsk Hydro acquires Årdal og Sunndal Verk in a merger to create the light metal division Hydro Aluminium.

== Popular culture ==
=== Sports ===
- 5 July – Ingrid Kristiansen breaks her own world record in the 10,000 metres at Bislett stadion, recording a time of 30:13.74 minutes.

== Notable births ==
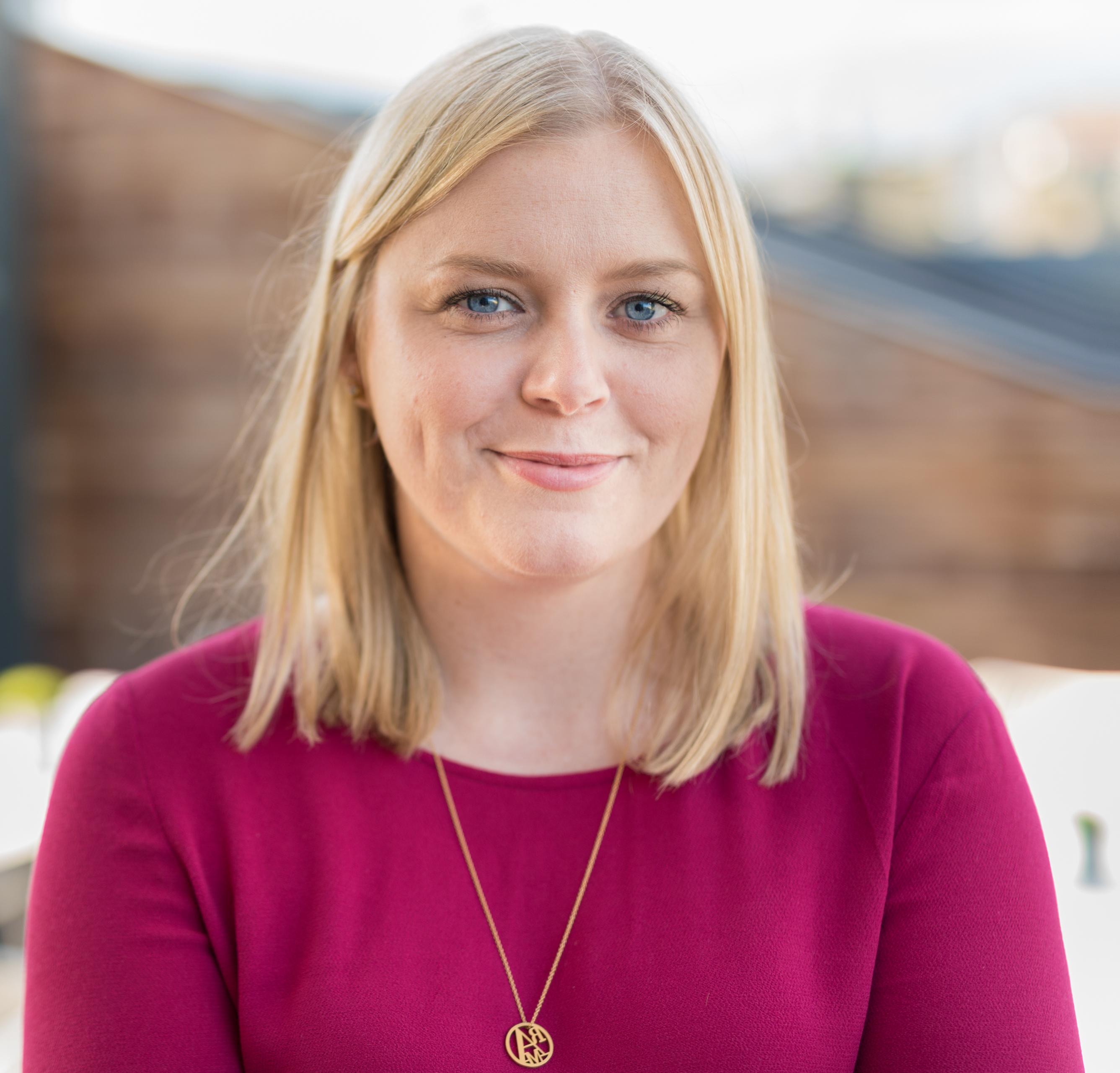
Tina Bru

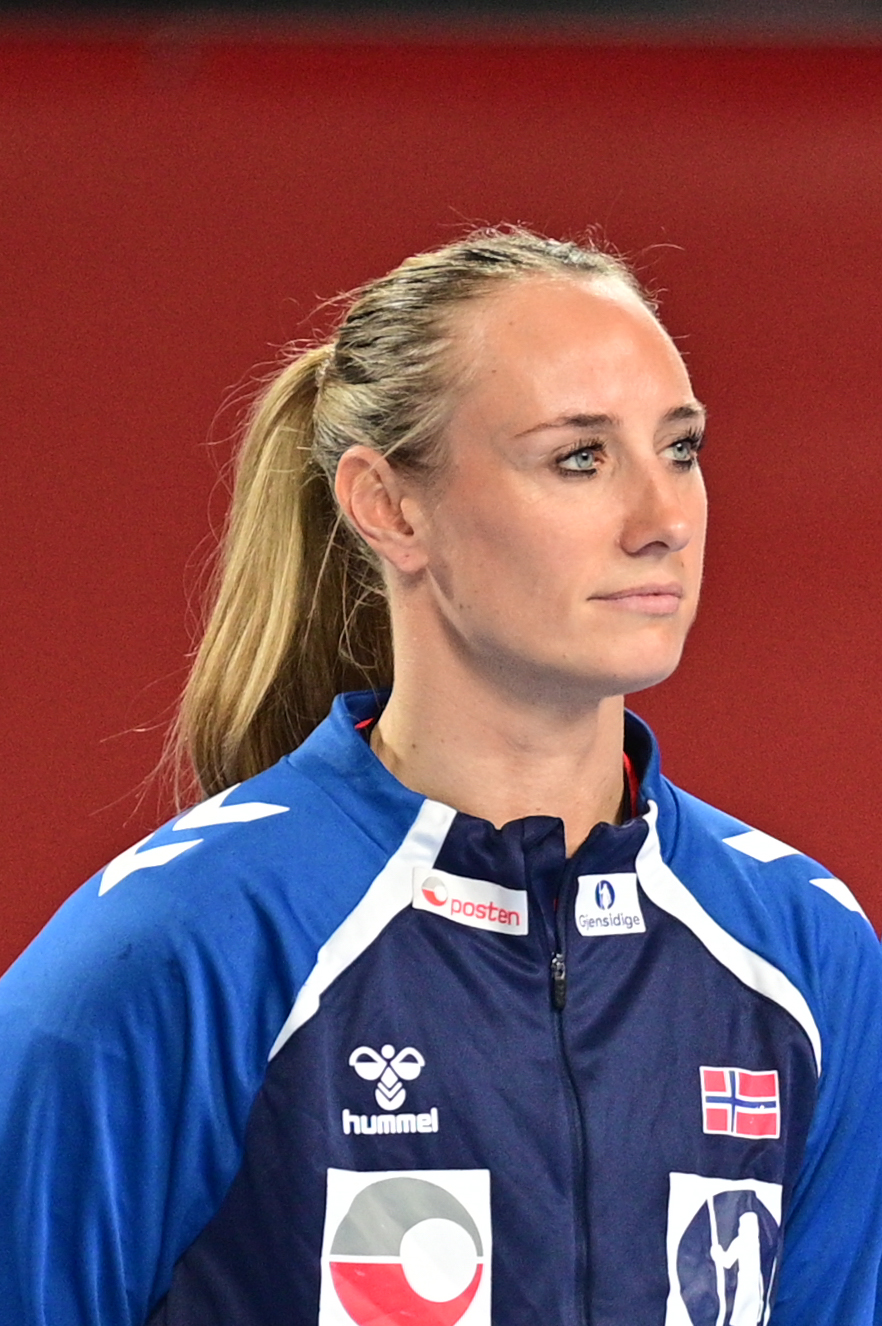
Camilla Herrem

- 10 February – Joakim Hykkerud, handball player.
- 27 February – Tom Kalsås, politician.
- 10 March – Jon Aaraas, ski jumper.
- 7 April – Stine Kufaas, athlete.
- 18 April – Tina Bru, politician.
- 9 May – Gine Cornelia Pedersen, writer and actress.
- 2 June – Lars Berrum, comedian.
- 22 June – Christian Spanne, handball player.
- 27 June – Stine Tomb, athlete.
- 8 July – Gisle Meininger Saudland, politician.
- 15 July – Arif Salum, rapper and singer.
- 24 July (in Somalia) – Marian Abdi Hussein, politician.
- 31 August – Elisabeth Slettum, athlete.
- 8 October – Camilla Herrem, handball player.
- 9 October – Jan Christian Vestre, businessperson and politician.
- 26 November – Åshild Bruun-Gundersen, politician.
- 5 December – Cathrine Larsåsen, athlete.

Full date missing

- Mari Moen Holsve, writer.

== Notable deaths ==
- 5 January – Eivind Sværen, shot putter (born 1917)
- 15 January – Knut Brynildsen, international soccer player (born 1917)
- 24 February – Arthur Rydstrøm, gymnast and Olympic silver medallist (born 1896)
- 26 March – Asbjørn Ruud, ski jumper and World Champion (born 1919)
- 23 April – Harald Nicolai Samuelsberg, politician (born 1911)
- 6 May – Toralf Westermoen, engineer, pioneer for the development of high speed craft (born 1914)
- 19 May – Knut Rød, police officer responsible for the transfer of Jewish people to SS troops in Oslo, acquitted (born 1900)
- 23 June – Kåre Siem, musician and writer (born 1914).
- 6 August – Hans-Jørgen Holman, musicologist and educationalist (born 1925)
- 10 August – Jon Snersrud, skier and Olympic bronze medallist (born 1902)
- 8 September – Idar Norstrand, civil servant and politician (born 1915)
- 24 September – Harald Selås, politician (born 1908)
- 25 September – Hans Vogt, linguist (born 1903)
- 18 October – Sverre Ingolf Haugli, speed skater and Olympic bronze medallist (born 1925)
- 22 October – Thorgeir Stubø, jazz guitarist, band leader, and composer (born 1943)
- 30 October – Olaf Hansen, boxer (born 1906)
- 31 October – Alfred Hauge, novelist, poet and historian (born 1915)
- 4 November – Thorolf Rafto, human rights activist and professor in Economic History (born 1922)
- 15 November – Erling Fjellbirkeland, research administrator (born 1911).
- 23 November – Olaf Hoffsbakken, Nordic skier, Olympic silver medallist and World Champion (born 1908)
- 8 December – Harald Throne-Holst, industrial leader (born 1905).
- 11 December – Olav O. Nomeland, politician (born 1919)
- 13 December – Jarl Johnsen, boxer (born 1913)
- 14 December – John Anker Johansen, gymnast and Olympic silver medallist (born 1894)
- 21 December – Helge Sivertsen, discus thrower, politician and Minister (born 1913)
- 31 December – Ole Johansen, politician (born 1904)

=== Full date unknown ===
- Sverre Marstrander, professor in archaeology (born 1910).
