= Veronica Ljosnes =

Norwegian circus performer and entertainer

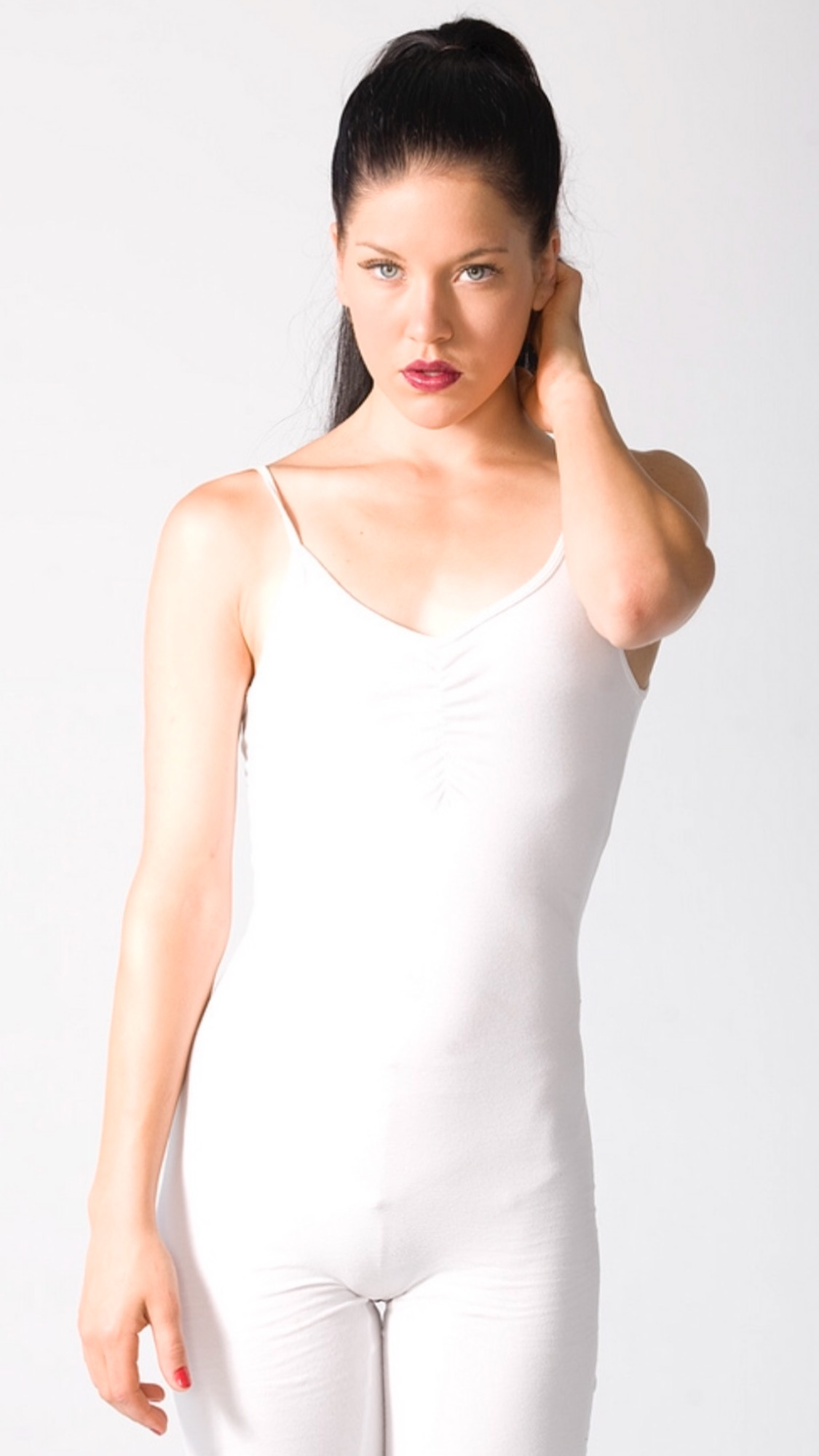
- Ljosnes (2016)
- Born: November 20, 1988 (age 37); Oslo, Norway
- Occupation: Entertainer
- Employer: Cirkus Agora

Mako Veronica Ljosnes (born November 20, 1988, in Oslo, Norway), is a Norwegian circus performer, currently working as an entertainer in Las Vegas, Nevada.

Ljosnes has worked in circuses all over Europe since she was a child, known as the circus artist from Norway, performing in Cirkus Agora as an aerialist and contortionist. She is known from the TV program America's Got Talent and several big events and concerts, as well as from the TV program Norway's Got Talent Miss Norway contest. Ljosnes also performed for the King and the Queen of Norway.

Ljosnes moved to Hollywood, got a part in the movie The Cloth, and is a model and actress while still performing as a contortionist.

Mako Veronica Ljosnes doing a stunt
