= Herman Hebler =

Norwegian artist

Herman Hebler (23 September 1911 – 21 August 2007) was a Norwegian printmaker and graphic artist who lived in Fredrikstad. Hebler's works were displayed on many important graphic biennials and triennials. He won a number of awards in Norway and abroad.

Hebler studied at the Kunsthochschule Essen (1937–39) and later at the Bjarne Engebrets maleskole Oslo (1947–48). He had his breakthrough in 1957 and 1958 when his work was awarded at the Riverside Museum in New York. Among the prizes awarded to Hebler during his life were the honour award of Fredrikstad, the anniversary award of Norwegian graphic artists, the Ulrik Henriksen honour award and the Rune Brynstad memorial grant. He also was an honorary citizen of the Macedonian city Bitola.

Hebler's works are displayed at the National Gallery of Norway, the Norsk kulturråd, the art collection of the city of Oslo, the Fredrikstad Museum, the Victoria and Albert Museum, the Kunsthalle Bremen, the Albertina, Vienna and many other museums around the world. Hebler's art style was similar to the minimalism of the 1960s. He was the initiator of the graphic triennial in Fredrikstad and was an honorary member of the Norwegian graphic artists association.
