= Oddvar Sponberg =

Norwegian racewalker

Oddvar Sponberg (18 August 1914 – 14 March 1975) was a Norwegian race walker.

He finished fourth in the 50 km race at the 1946 European Championships and twelfth at the 1950 European Championships. He never participated in other international events such as the Summer Olympics.
