= Claus Marius Neergaard =

Norwegian politician

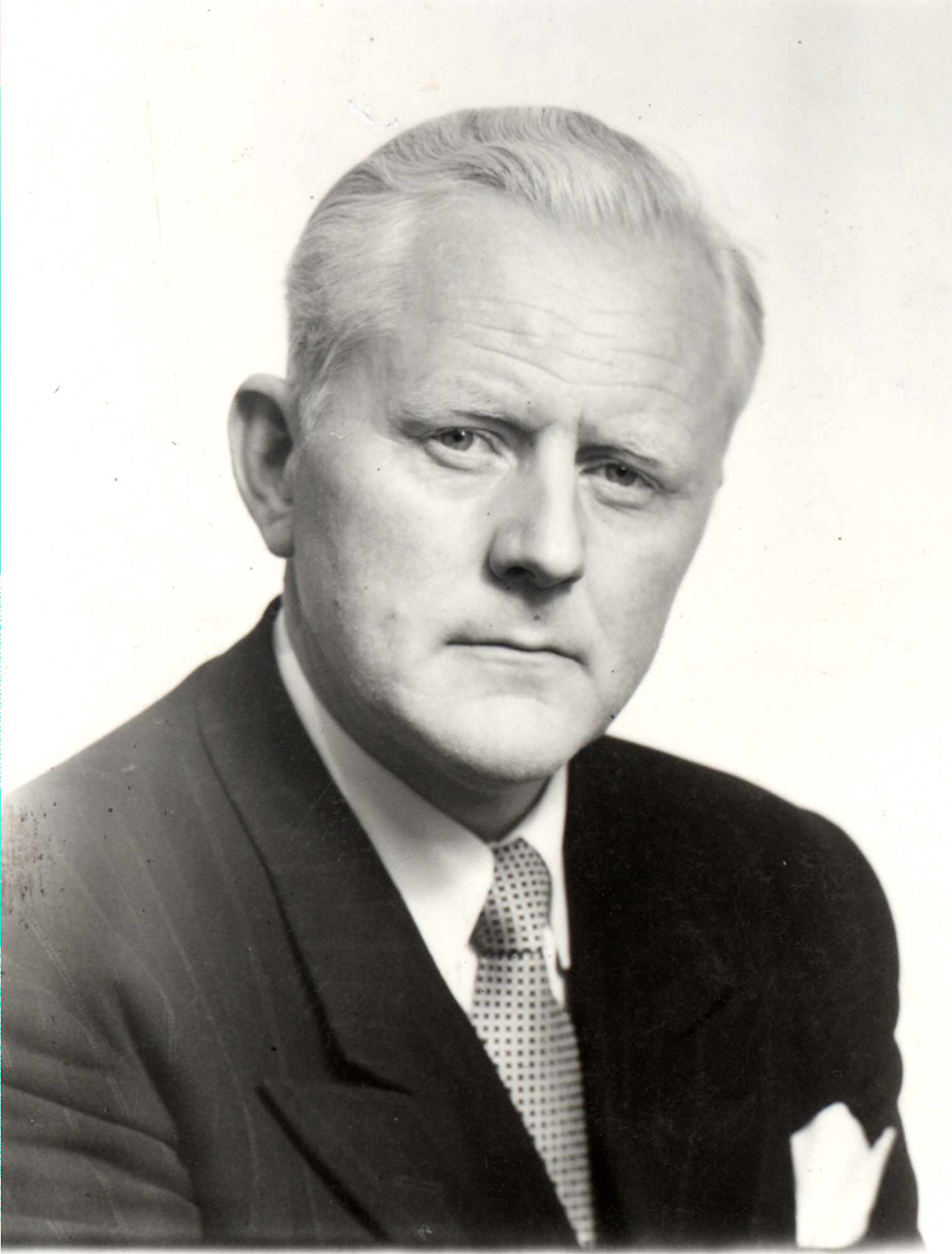
Claus Marius Neergaard

Claus Marius Neergaard (18 July 1911 – 22 December 1990) was a Norwegian politician for the Labour Party.

He was born in Kristiansund.

He was elected to the Norwegian Parliament from Møre og Romsdal in 1961. He was not re-elected in 1965, only serving one term. He did not hold any elected positions in local politics.
