= Halvor Thorbjørn Hjertvik =

Norwegian politician

Halvor Thorbjørn Hjertvik (17 June 1914 - 7 November 1995) was a Norwegian politician for the Christian Democratic Party.

He served as a deputy representative to the Norwegian Parliament from Rogaland during the terms 1958–1961 and 1961–1965.
