= Farsund shooting =

1988 shooting in Norway

- Location: Farsund Municipality, Norway
- Date: 20 August 1988; 38 years ago
- Attack type: Mass shooting
- Weapon: Shotgun
- Deaths: 4
- Injuries: 2
- Perpetrator: Unnamed 23-year-old man

The Farsund shooting was a mass shooting that took place at a shooting range in Farsund Municipality, Norway, on 20 August 1988. Four people were shot and killed with a shotgun, and two were injured. Two of the killed were paramedics who arrived at the scene some time after the first shootings. At that time, it was the deadliest mass shooting in modern Norwegian history until the 2011 Norway attacks by Anders Behring Breivik, in which 69 people were killed in Utøya island.

== Perpetrator and victims ==
The perpetrator was identified as a 23-year-old man with a mental disorder. No obvious motives were behind the killings. He was described as a weapon-interested "lone wolf" who owned a large number of weapons. He used slugs and buckshot during the shooting, two types of ammunition that was banned in Norway at the time.

In 1989, the offender, who was considered insane when committing the shooting, was sentenced to ten years of involuntary confinement at a psychiatric institution. The doctors that testified in the trial stated that he had had schizophrenia since his early teenage years. In 1999, he was sentenced to an additional five years.

Those killed were Per Odd Reite, 42; Bjørn Halvorsen, 22; Gunnar Eliassen, 31; and Geir Olav Lundtræ, 24 (the latter two were paramedics). Kjell Stillufsen and Gunnar Gabrielsen escaped the shooting with minor injuries.

== Aftermath ==
One of the incident's repercussions was that ambulance personnel were equipped with radios while they were in the field. The incident also helped to uncover deficiencies in the security equipment used by the Norwegian police, and in particular the small number of bulletproof vests that were available to local police. Studies showed that there was just one bulletproof vest available per local police station (Norwegian:Lensmannskontor; similar to sheriff's office) in 1988. The debate that arose led to the Ministry of Justice acquiring 800 new vests during the fall that were sent to smaller police stations all over the country.

Furthermore, the incident changed the operating practice in terms of how health professionals should proceed in similar situations. For instance, ambulance workers will not be dispatched to a venue before the area has been secured by the police.
