= Oda Malmin =

Oda Malmin (born 1987) is a Norwegian novelist.

She hails from Gausel/Forus in Stavanger. She was hired as an editor in the Nynorsk publishing house Det Norske Samlaget. She has released two novels on Aschehoug, Steinauge (2018) and Skinliv (2021).

Steinauge was reviewed in Stavanger Aftenblad, Klassekampen, Adresseavisen and Øy-Blikk. Skinliv was reviewed in Klassekampen, Dagbladet (dice throw 6), Dag og Tid and Stavanger Aftenblad.
