= David Berget =

Norwegian film director and screenwriter

David Berset Berget (born 30 September 1988) is a Norwegian film director and screenwriter.

Berget was born in Oslo. He received his education at the American Film Institute where he studied directing.

His short film The Fratres (2011) was selected by Danny Lennon to screen in a special program under The 64th annual Cannes Film festival.

His feature film debut Agnes Against the World premiered in 2026.
