= Cirkus Agora =

Norwegian travelling circus

Cirkus Agora is one of five travelling circuses in Norway. It was started in 1989 by Jan Ketil Smørdal. It went bankrupt after a trip to Iceland in 2008, and then again the next year.
