= Olav Aase =

Norwegian politician

Deputy representative for the Norwegian Parliament
- In office 1945–1949

Member of the municipal council of Flekkefjord Municipality
- In office 1937–1940, 1959–1963 and 1963–1967

Personal details
- Born: 13 June 1914
- Died: 26 August 1992 (aged 78)
- Party: Labour Party

Olav Aase (13 June 1914 – 26 August 1992) was a Norwegian politician for the Labour Party. He was born in Flekkefjord.

He served as a deputy representative to the Norwegian Parliament from the Market towns of Vest-Agder and Rogaland counties during the term 1945–1949. On the local level, Aase was a member of the municipal council of Flekkefjord Municipality during the terms 1937–1940, 1959–1963 and 1963–1967.

Among other things he worked in newspapers, being the editor-in-chief of Agder Folkeblad in 1949.
