= Rannveig Aamodt =

Norwegian rock climber

- Born: 3 January 1984 (age 42); Molde, Norway
- Occupation: Rock Climber

Rannveig Aamodt (born 3 January 1984 in Molde, Norway) is a Norwegian rock climber.

== Early life ==
Rannveig Aamodt was born on 3 January 1984 in Molde, Norway. At 22 years old, she became one of the youngest people to complete a 3,800-kilometer winter ski traverse of Norway, starting at the country's southernmost point (the lighthouse at Lindesnes) and ending 14 weeks later at the northernmost point on the mainland (Nordkapp). Aamodt began the unassisted journey in 2006 on her birthday with fellow adventurer Anne Grete Nebell. The pair was accompanied by two Greenland dogs, which helped them pull their supply-laden pulk.

== Achievements ==
In April 2012, Aamodt took a 50- foot ground fall while sport climbing in Turkey with her husband Nathan Welton, due to a mistake she made in preparing to be lowered from the anchor in an unusual rope configuration. She suffered dislocation/fractures of both ankles (one open), 3 vertebral compression fractures, a pelvis fracture, various fractures of the small bones in her feet, an open fracture/dislocation of her right elbow, and tears and ruptures of tendons in her ankles and upper arm. She used a wheelchair for 2 months but returned to climbing. Eight months post the accident, she redpointed 5.13c (8a+), two grades higher than she was climbing at pre-accident.
