= Bjørn Fraser =

Norwegian naval and aviation officer

- Born: 12 September 1911; Horten, Norway
- Died: 22 March 1993 (aged 81); Tenerife, Spain
- Allegiance: Norway
- Service / branch: Norwegian Army; Royal Norwegian Air Force
- Battles / wars: Second World War

Bjørn Fraser (12 September 1911 – 22 March 1993) was a Norwegian naval and aviation officer.

== Personal life ==
Fraser was born in Horten on 12 September 1911, a son of ship's captain Nils Wilhelm Fredriksen and Olga Arnesen. In 1946 he married Margrethe Hirth Nilssen.

He died on 22 March 1993 in Tenerife, Spain.

== Military career ==
Fraser graduated as naval officer in 1933, was promoted to lieutenant in 1935, and attended Marinens flyveskole from 1936 to 1937. He held various positions in the Navy between 1933 and 1940. During the German invasion of Norway in April 1940, he took part in the defense, serving with the Norwegian Army. He received further education at Air University in the United States in 1951, and at the NATO Defense College in Paris in 1956. He served as head of Sola Air Station from 1963. During World War II he was sentenced to death for trying to escape to England (along with Hjalmar Svae and Per Sverre Birkevold), but was later reprieved and sent to prisons in Germany.
