= Kristina Leganger Iversen =

Norwegian writer and literary scholar

- Born: 21 June 1989 (age 37); Åsane, Bergen, Norway
- Education: University of Oslo; University of Gothenburg
- Occupations: Writer, literary scholar

Kristina Leganger Iversen (born 21 June 1989) is a Norwegian writer and literary scholar.

== Career ==
Born in Åsane in Bergen on 21 June 1989, Iversen graduated in literary science from the University of Oslo, and has had temporary research assignments at the university. Her master thesis was a treatment of parts of the writings of Siri Hustvedt. She later also studied at the University of Gothenburg.

Iversen made her literary debut in 2011 with the poetry collection, or poetic novel, Hjartemekanikk. Her novel I ringane from 2015 centers about a woman and her social relations. In 2019 she published the non-fiction book Bli mor no?
