= Leif Hamre =

Norwegian military officer and writer

- Born: 9 August 1915; Molde, Norway
- Died: 20 August 2007 (aged 93); Lier, Norway
- Occupations: Writer, aviator
- Writing career
- Genre: Children's fiction
- Notable work: Otter tre to kaller (Leap into Danger)

Leif Hamre (9 August 1914 – 20 August 2007) was a Norwegian military officer and children's writer.

== Biography ==
He was born in Molde. He studied at the Norwegian National Academy of Fine Arts in Oslo. Hamre was trained as a pilot in Scotland and as a navigator at Little Norway in Canada during the Second World War. He continued his military career after the war, and assumed various leading positions in the Royal Norwegian Air Force. He is regarded as a pioneer of helicopter transport in Norway. He organized and became head of the Air Force's helicopter service, retiring as Colonel Lieutenant in 1974. He died in Lier in 2007.

Between 1957 and 1978, Hamre wrote six books for children and youth. He became for his action books for boys, in which he utilized his experience in aviation. He made his literary debut in 1957 with Otter tre to kaller (Otter Three Two Calling), which won first prize from the publishing house Aschehoug, in their competition for best book for boys. The setting in the book is a rescue operation after an aircraft accident at Finnmarksvidda, under harsh weather conditions. The book was translated into English as Leap into Danger (1959). A follow-up, Blå to – hopp ut came in 1958. Later books are Klart fly from 1959, Brutt kontakt from 1965, Operasjon Arktis from 1971, and Fly uten fører from 1978. The books have been translated into nineteen languages. In 2002, he was awarded the King's Medal of Merit.
