= Johannes Lislerud =

Norwegian politician

Johannes Lislerud (12 October 1911 - 28 October 1989) was a Norwegian politician for the Labour Party.

He served as a deputy representative to the Norwegian Parliament from Østfold during the terms 1954–1957, 1958–1961 and 1961–1965.
