= Petter Pettersson Jr. =

Norwegian politician

Petter Pettersson Jr. (19 May 1911 – 9 October 1984) was a Norwegian politician for the Conservative Party.

He served as a deputy representative to the Norwegian Parliament from Møre og Romsdal during the terms 1954–1957, 1961–1965, 1965–1969 and 1969–1973.
