= Arne Tuft =

Norwegian cross country skier (1911–1989)

Arne Tuft (16 January 1911 – 23 June 1989) was a Norwegian cross-country skier who competed in the 1932 Winter Olympics.

He was born in Hønefoss and died in Oslo.

In 1936 he finished sixth in the 50 km competition.

Arne Tuft was the grandfather of Canadian cyclist Svein Tuft.

== Cross-country skiing results ==
All results are sourced from the International Ski Federation (FIS).

=== Olympic Games ===
Year	Age	18 km	50 km	4 × 10 km relay
1936	25	—	6	—

=== World Championships ===
Year	Age	18 km	50 km	4 × 10 km relay
1937	26	—	DNF	—
1938	27	115	—	—
