= Magnar Hellebust =

Norwegian politician

Magnar Hellebust (30 June 1914 – 15 February 2008) was a Norwegian politician for the Liberal Party.

He served as a deputy representative to the Parliament of Norway from Troms during the terms 1969–1973 and 1973–1977. In total he met during 73 days of parliamentary session.
