= Erling Fjellbirkeland =

Norwegian research administrator

- Born: 21 February 1911; Fana Municipality, Norway
- Died: 15 November 1986 (aged 75); Oslo, Norway
- Education: Economist
- Occupation: Administrator

Erling Fjellbirkeland (21 February 1911 – 15 November 1986) was a Norwegian research administrator.

== Personal life ==
Fjellbirkeland was born in Fana Municipality on 21 February 1911, a son of farmer Nils Fjellbirkeland and Kari Grinde. He married Maina Schia in 1940.

== Career ==
Fjellbirkeland graduated as cand.oecon. in 1935. He directed the Norwegian Research Council for Science and the Humanities from 1953 to 1966. He was secretary-general of Hovedkomiteen for norsk forskning from 1966 to 1981. From 1951 to 1968 he was chairman of the board of the Foundation for Student Life in Oslo.

He was decorated Knight, First Class of the Order of St. Olav in 1963.

Fjellbirkeland died in Oslo on 15 November 1986.
