= Reidar Fauske Sognnaes =

American academic (1911–1984)

Reidar Sognnaes (November 6, 1911 – September 21, 1984) was Dean of the Harvard School of Dental Medicine, founding Dean of the UCLA School of Dentistry and scholar in the field of oral pathology.

== Biography ==
Reidar Fauske Sognnaes was born in Bergen, Norway. Sognnæs grew up in Bergen and took his final exams at Tanks gymnas in 1931. He took the first part of dental education in Leipzig, and concluded with an examination at the Norwegian Dental School (Norges Tannlegehøyskole) in 1936. He participated in a Norwegian scientific expedition to Tristan da Cunha during 1937-38. Sognnaes came to America in 1938 as an intern at the Forsyth Dental Infirmary for Children in Boston. He continued on as a Carnegie Dental Fellow at the University of Rochester School of Medicine and Dentistry in New York, where he earned a master of science degree in physiology and a PhD in pathology in 1941.

Following World War II, in which he served in the Royal Norwegian Air Force, Sognnaes accepted a teaching position at Harvard University. There he occupied an endowed chair as the Charles A. Brackett professor of oral pathology and eventually served Director of Postdoctoral Studies at the Harvard School of Dental Medicine between 1956 and 1960, when he came to UCLA. Sognnaes guided the founding of the UCLA School of Dentistry, which was established in 1960. Sognnæs also put his name on scientific publications, primarily on research on tooth enamel and fluoride. Later he published several articles on education and research. He stepped down as dean in 1968, but continued as professor.

Sognnaes is credited with identifying the remains of Adolf Hitler and Martin Bormann, through examination of American and Soviet documents. Sognnaes also disproved the theory that President George Washington had wooden teeth. When the original dentures were stolen from the Smithsonian Institution during 1981, he was able to produce a duplicate.

Reidar Sognnaes was President of the International Association for Dental Research, a member of the American Association for the Advancement of Science and held an honorary doctorate from the University of Oslo. The Reidar Sognnaes Award of Excellence is awarded annually by the American Academy of Forensic Sciences in honor of Sognnaes.

== Personal life ==
Sognnaes married Edel Marie Johanna Holand (1916–2010), the daughter of Jorgen Kristian Holand and Annette Marthea Foldvik in Kristiania (now Oslo) Norway on June 29, 1939. They were the parents of four children, Solveig, Reidun, Thor, and Annelise.

== Selected works ==
- Oral health survey of Tristan da Cunha ) (1954)
- Microstructure and histochemical characteristics of the mineralized tissues (1955)
- Calcification in Biological Systems (1960)
- Chemistry and prevention of dental caries (1962)
- Mechanisms of Hard Tissue Destruction (1963)
- America's most famous teeth (1974)
- Dental evidence in the postmortem identification of Adolf Hitler, Eva Braun, and Martin Bormann (1977)

== Other sources ==
- In memoriam, Reidar Sognnaes (1911-1984)--34th President of the IADR, 1957-58 (Journal of Dental Research. 1984 Nov; 63. 11)
- Reidar Fauske Sognnaes, MA, DMD, PhD, schools of medicine and dentistry University of California, Los Angeles. (Scanodont. 1975 May;3(2):20.) PMID: 801292.
