= Einar Hildrum =

Norwegian landscape architect and magazine editor

Einar Hildrum (10 January 1902 – 31 January 1991) was a Norwegian landscape architect and magazine editor.

He was born at Overhalla Municipality in Trøndelag, Norway. He was a farmer's son. He attended various schools before studying garden architecture at the Norwegian College of Agriculture from 1926 to 1929. In 1934 he was hired as a secretary in the Norwegian Horticulture Society, succeeding Olav Skard. He edited the society's magazine Norsk Hagetidend from 1935 to 1960. He also edited a quarterly periodical from 1935 to 1939, the yearbook Frukt og Bær from 1948 as well as the annual publication Minneliste for hagedyrkere and the quintennial publication Sortsliste for hagedyrkere.

From 1953 to 1970 Hildrum was the director of the Norwegian Horticulture Society. Hildrum chaired the Norwegian Association of Landscape Architects from 1938 to 1939, and was an honorary member of both the Horticulture Society and the Association of Landscape Architects. In 1974 he was awarded the HM The King's Medal of Merit (Kongens fortjenstmedalje) in gold. He was married to Dagny Berre (1904–1995) since August 1933, and died in January 1991 in Oslo.
