= Nils Sønnevik =

Norwegian politician

Nils Sønnevik (28 September 1911 – 20 November 1988) was a Norwegian politician for the Liberal Party. He served as a deputy representative to the Norwegian Parliament from Vest-Agder during the term 1958–1961 and 1961–1965.
