= 1981 in Norway =

- Centuries: 18th; 19th; 20th; 21st
- Decades: 1960s; 1970s; 1980s; 1990s; 2000s
- See also: List of years in Norway

Events in the year 1981 in Norway.

== Incumbents ==
- Monarch – Olav V.
- Prime Minister – Odvar Nordli (Labour Party) until 4 February, Gro Harlem Brundtland (Labour Party) until 14 October, Kåre Willoch (Conservative Party)

== Events ==
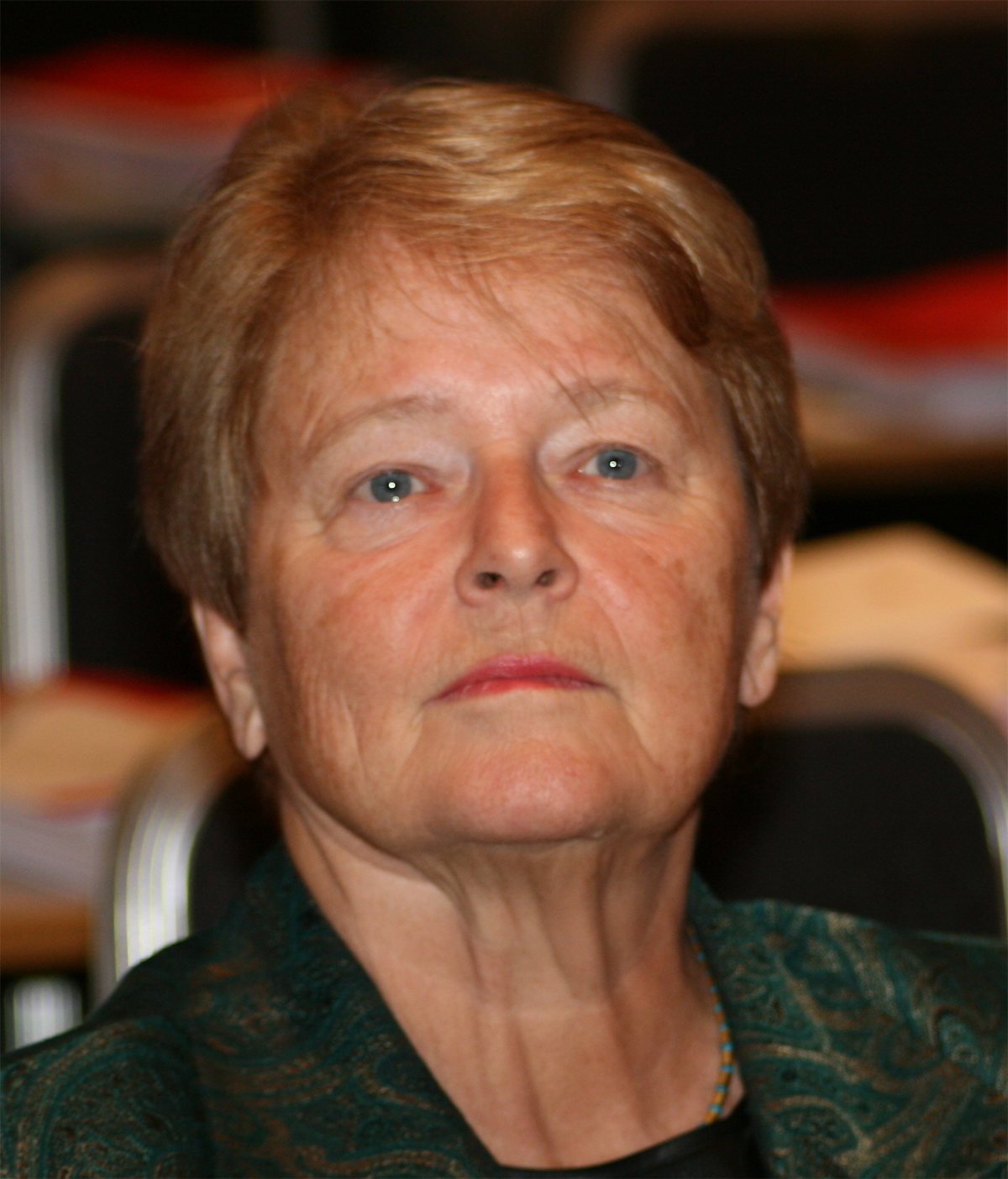
Gro Harlem Brundtland becomes the first female Prime Minister of Norway

- Norway becomes the first country in the world to enact a law to prevent discrimination against homosexuals.
- The Hessdalen light UFO phenomenon emerged in December and occurred with high frequency for the next several years.
- Norwegian Supreme Court denies the Saami claims to the pastoral lands the Alta Dam was built on.

=== January ===
- Tor Røste Fossen coaches the Norwegian association football team.

=== February ===
- 4 February – Gro Harlem Brundtland's First Cabinet was appointed. Gro Harlem Brundtland becomes the first female Prime Minister of Norway.

=== September ===
- 1 September - The Act of Ombudsperson was entered into force. (First in the world)
- 13 - 14 September - The 1981 Parliamentary election results in a swing for the political "right".

=== October ===
- 12 October – The government of Gro Harlem Brundtland resigns
- 13 October – Permission to leave was granted by King Olav V
- 14 October – Willoch's First Cabinet was appointed.

=== November ===
- 5 November – Five people are killed when a seaplane crashes in the Forsand Municipality.

== Popular culture ==
=== Film ===
- *Betrayal* (*Løperjenten*), a Norwegian drama film directed by Vibeke Løkkeberg.
- *Little Ida* (*Liten Ida*), a Norwegian–Swedish drama film based on the novel by Marit Paulsen.

== Notable births ==
=== January ===
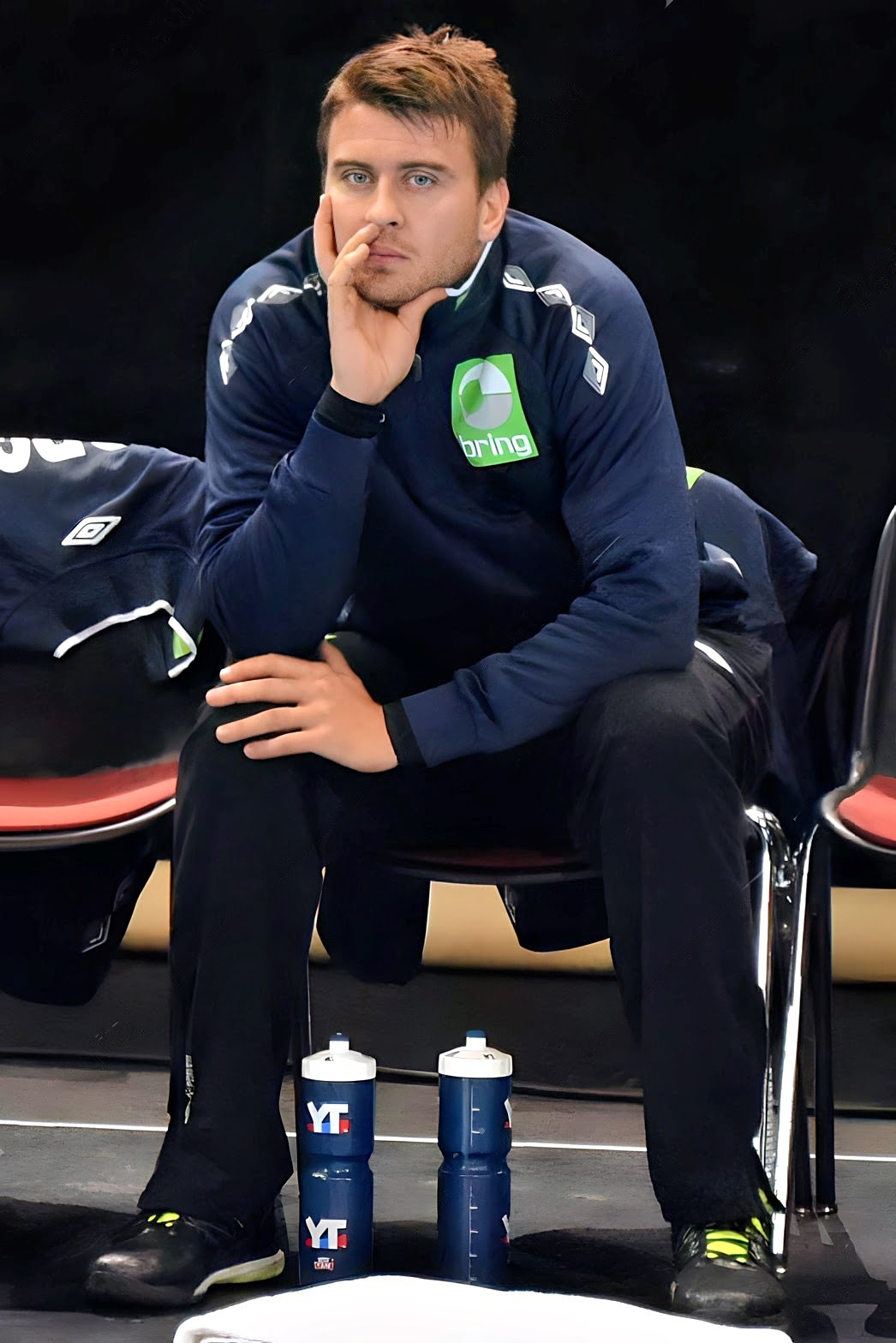
Ole Erevik

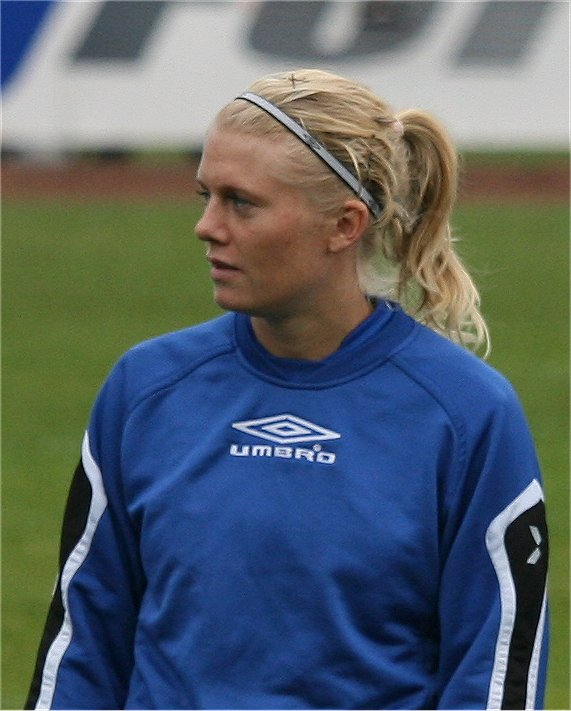
Solveig Gulbrandsen

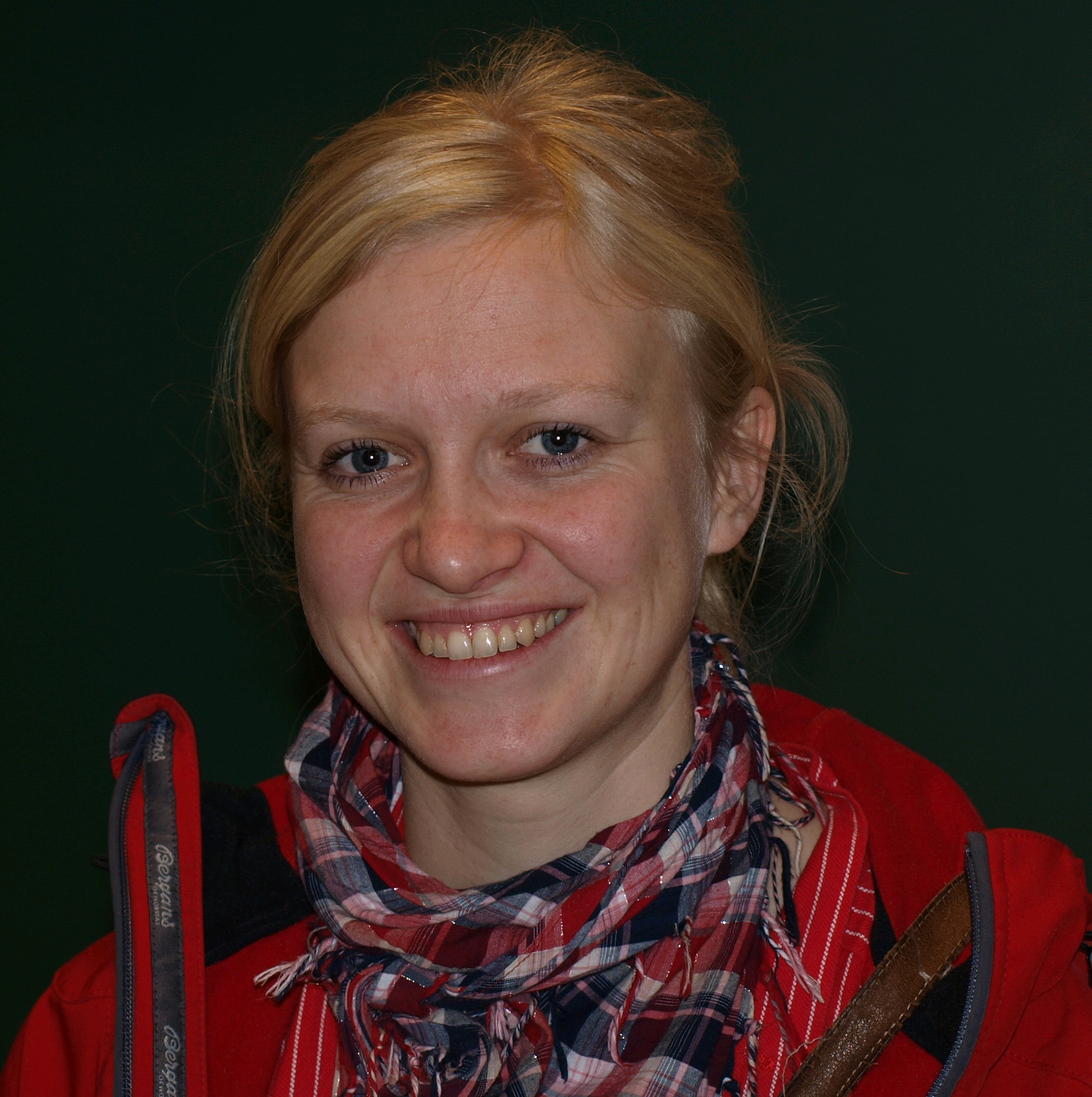
Maria Parr

- 8 January – Kristin Mürer Stemland, cross-country skier.
- 9 January – Ole Erevik, handball player.
- 9 January – Christian Møllerop, LGBT rights activist
- 12 January – Solveig Gulbrandsen, footballer
- 18 January – Maria Parr, children's writer.
- 18 January – Martin Taxt, jazz musician
- 19 January – Bjørn Arve Lund, footballer
- 27 January – Thomas Løvold, curler
- 28 January – Erlend Hanstveit, footballer

=== February ===
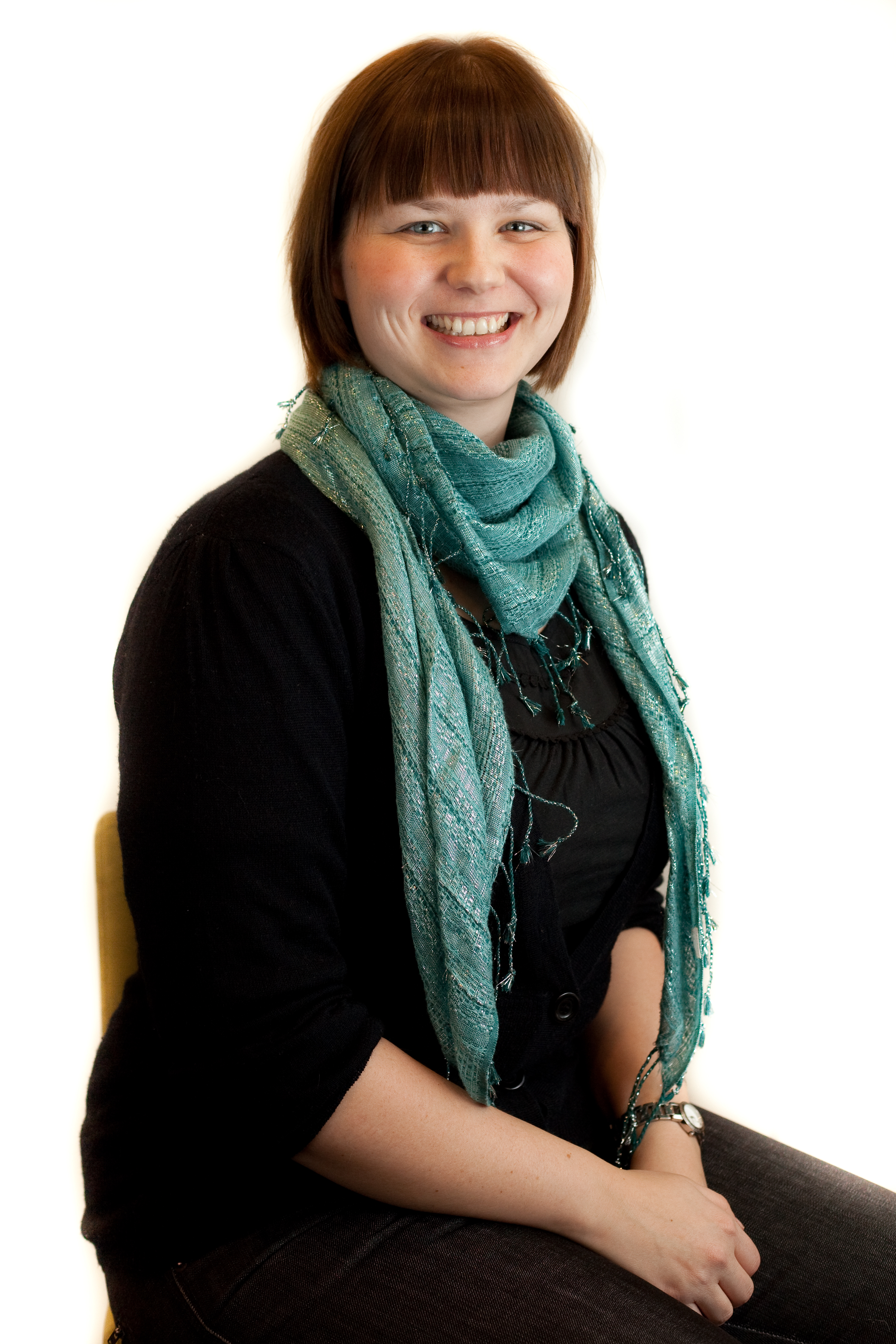
Guri Melby

- 3 February – Guri Melby, politician
- 13 February – Ingrid Lønningdal, artist
- 19 February – Thomas Holm, footballer
- 25 February – Anne Solsvik, politician
- 28 February – Tjostolv Moland, army officer and security contractor (died 2013)

=== March ===
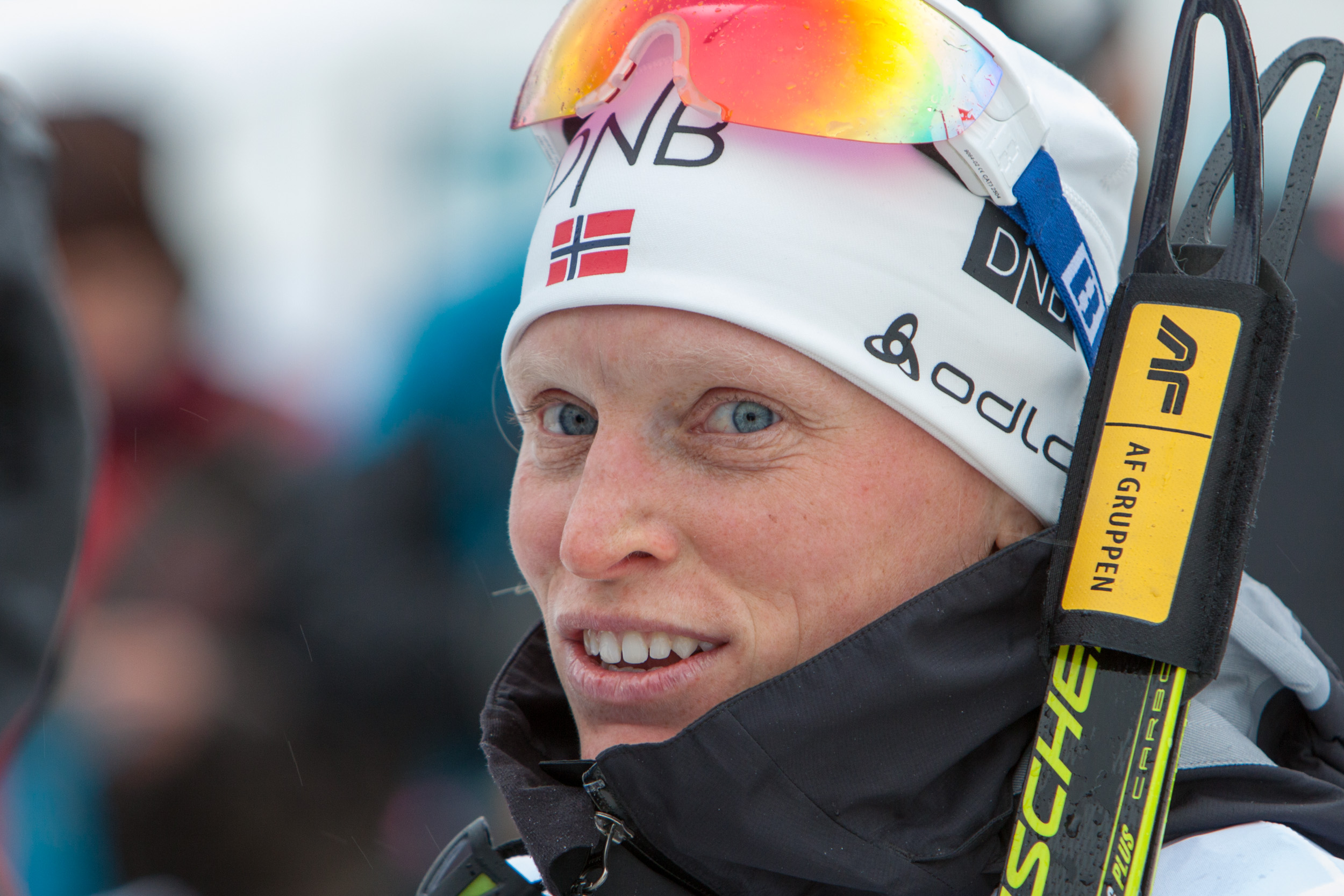
Tora Berger

- 5 March – Mazyar Keshvari, politician
- 7 March – Mona Fastvold, filmmaker and actress
- 8 March – Jonas Solberg Andersen, ice hockey player
- 17 March – Simen Brenne, footballer
- 18 March – Tora Berger, biathlete.
- 18 March – Ingrid Olava, singer and musician
- 21 March – Leni Larsen Kaurin, footballer
- 21 March – Arcane Station, musician, producer and songwriter
- 23 March – Ragnhild Kvarberg, middle distance and long-distance runner
- 25 March – Cato Sundberg, musician
- 25 March – Roy Hegreberg, road bicycle racer
- 28 March – Jan Grue, writer and linguist.

=== April ===
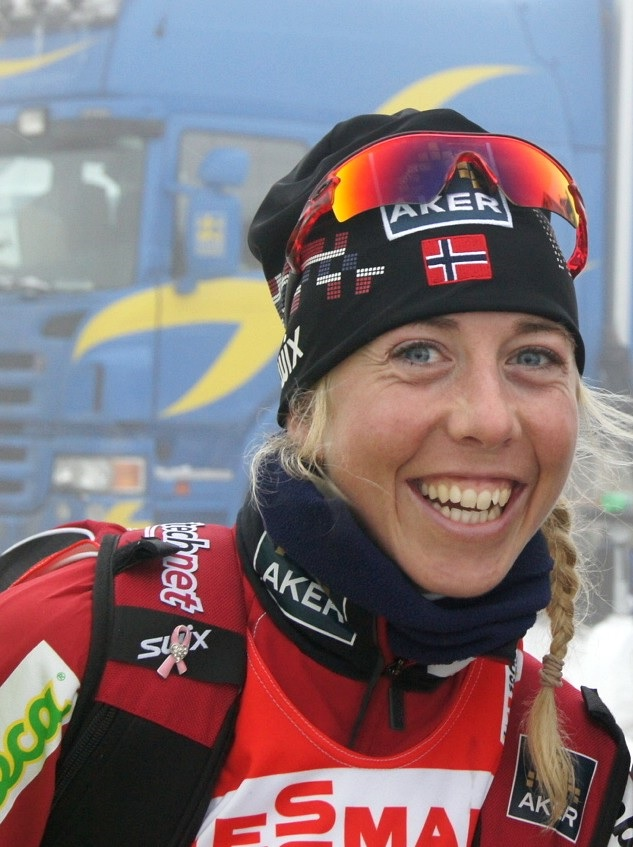
Kristin Størmer Steira

- 1 April – Helene Bøksle, singer and actress
- 1 April – Bjørn Einar Romøren, ski jumper
- 2 April – Patrick Holtet, footballer
- 7 April – Amund Maarud, blues/rock musician and composer
- 8 April – Nils Bech, singer
- 8 April – Mari Hagen, politician
- 9 April – Charlotte Frogner, actress
- 15 April – Jon Reidar Øyan, gay rights activist and politician
- 18 April – Hedvig Bjelkevik, speed skater
- 19 April – Lise Klaveness, lawyer and footballer.
- 19 April – Jan Gunnar Solli, footballer
- 23 April – Lars-Henrik Paarup Michelsen, politician
- 27 April – Hilde Marie Kjersem, artist, musician and songwriter
- 30 April – Kristin Størmer Steira, cross-country skier

=== May ===
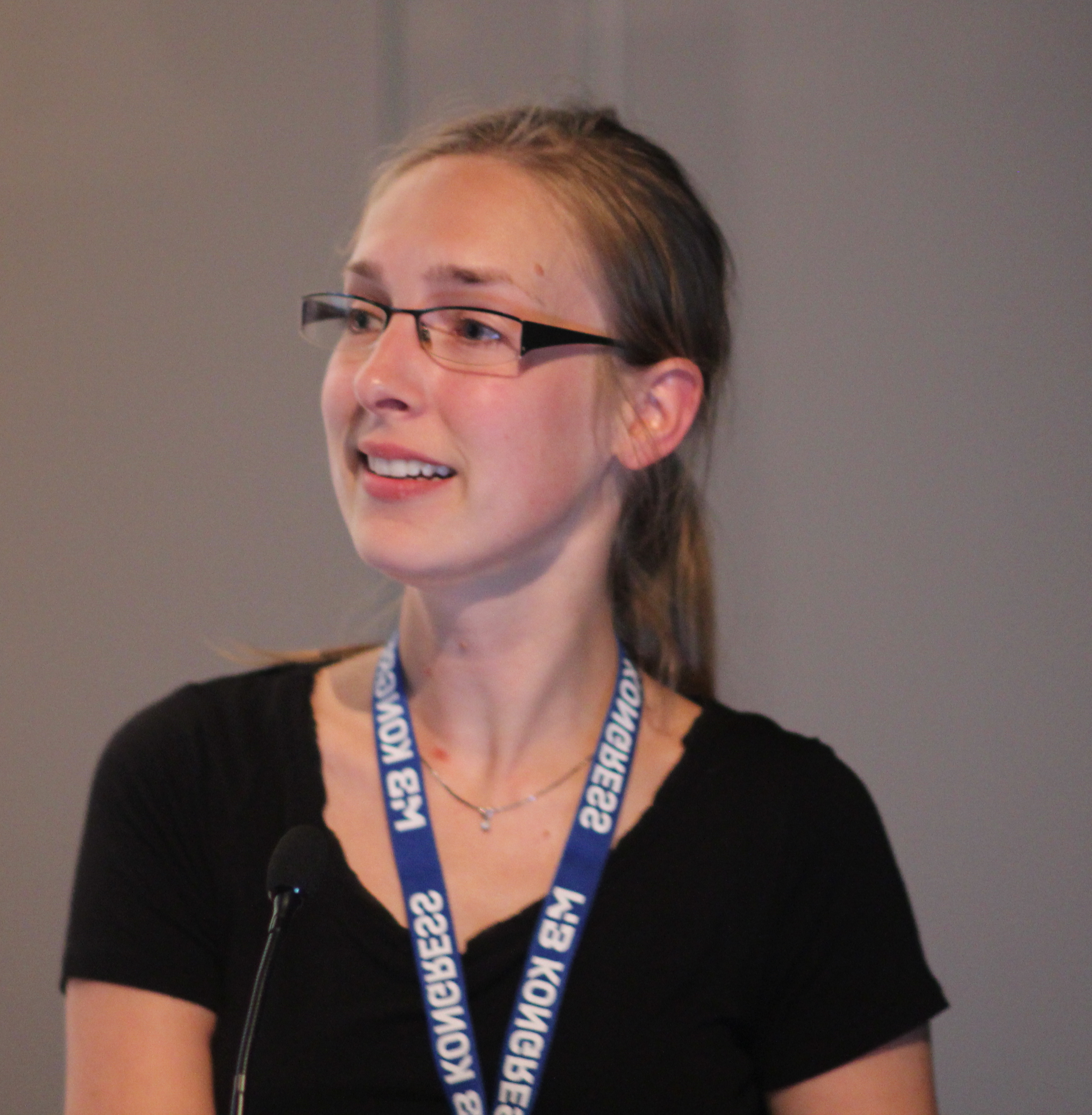
Iselin Nybø

- 14 May – Iselin Nybø, politician
- 19 May – Janicke Gunvaldsen, racing cyclist
- 25 May – Anette Trettebergstuen, politician
- 27 May – Hanne Blåfjelldal, politician

=== June ===
- 3 June – Kristoffer Paulsen Vatshaug, footballer
- 4 June – Linn Nyrønning, footballer
- 4 June – Jan Trygve Røyneland, television and film writer
- 12 June – Afua Hirsch, writer, broadcaster, and former barrister
- 16 June – Ola Kvernberg, jazz violinist and composer.
- 16 June – Richard Skog, strongman competitor
- 16 June – Knut Walde, footballer
- 20 June – Brede Hangeland, footballer
- 20 June – Lene Storløkken, footballer.

=== July ===
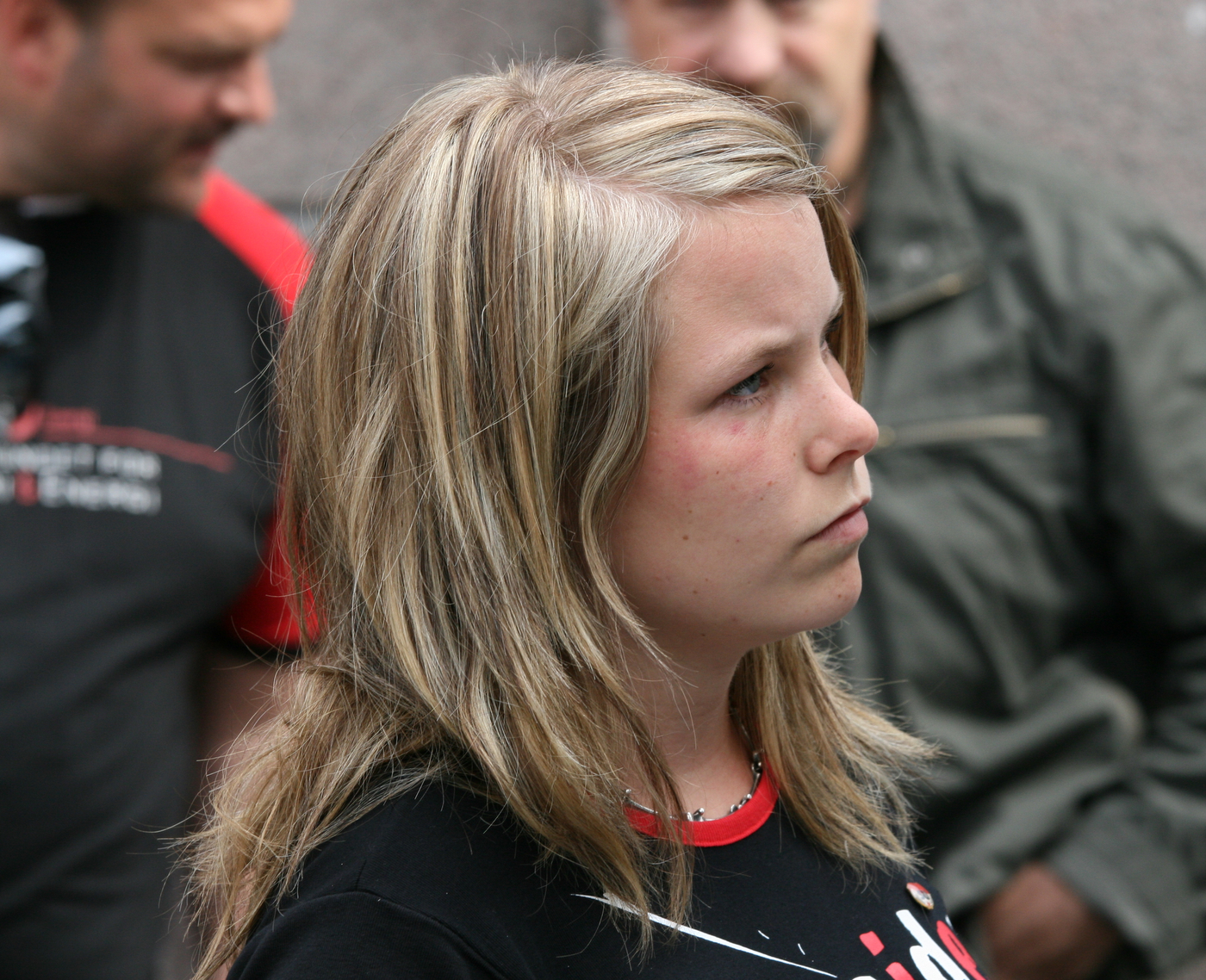
Kirsti Bergstø

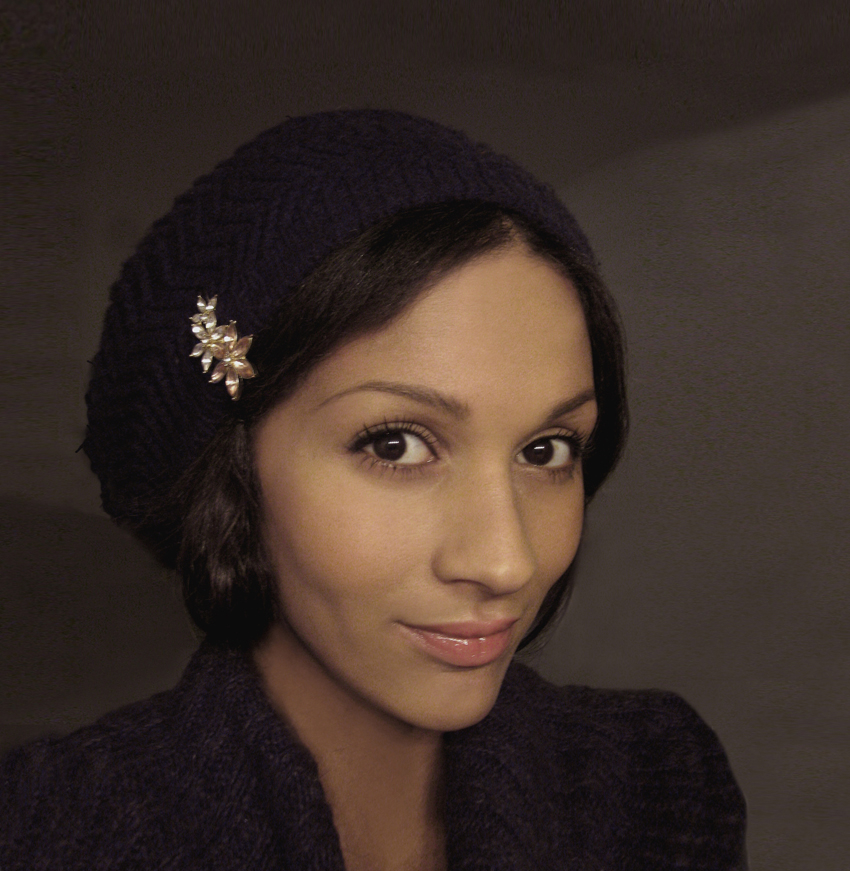
Lisa Aisato

- 1 July – Kirsti Bergstø, politician
- 13 July – Sigurd Hole, jazz musician
- 16 July – Vigdis Hårsaker, handball player
- 18 July – Sturla Torkildsen, fencer
- 19 July – Anne Lise Frøkedal, singer-songwriter
- 23 July – Lisa Aisato, illustrator and visual artist.
- 27 July – Sverre Krogh Sundbø, poker player
- 28 July – Lars Fredrik Frøislie, musician
- 28 July – Frank Kjosås, actor
- 29 July – Gjermund Larsen, traditional folk musician and composer

=== August ===
- 1 August – Pia Haraldsen, TV personality
- 3 August – Ingvild Stensland, footballer
- 3 August – Erlend Tvinnereim, operatic tenor
- 7 August – Ingvill Måkestad Bovim, track and field athlete
- 7 August – Ann Iren Mørkved, footballer
- 9 August – Azar Karadaş, soccer player
- 21 August – Jon Engen-Helgheim, politician
- 28 August – Marius Johnsen, footballer

=== September ===
- 1 September – Inger Lise Hansen, politician
- 3 September – Fredrik Klock, footballer
- 8 September – Morten Gamst Pedersen, footballer
- 10 September – Morten Adamsen, competition rower.
- 11 September – Vemund Brekke Skard, footballer
- 22 September – Ingrid Vetlesen, soprano
- 23 September – Ryan Wiik, actor and entrepreneur
- 25 September – Leo Olsen, footballer
- 27 September – Espen Hægeland, footballer
- 28 September – Cecilia Brækhus, professional boxer and kickboxer

=== October ===
- 2 October – Helge Nitteberg, journalist and newspaper editor.
- 8 October – Sten Ove Eike, footballer
- 13 October – Vidar Norheim, drummer and songwriter
- 24 October – Fredrik Mikkelsen, musician and composer
- 28 October – Andreas Loven, jazz pianist
- 29 October – Lene Alexandra, singer and model
- 30 October – Lars Petter Sveen, novelist.

=== November ===
- 3 November – Gunhild Følstad, footballer
- 20 November – Marit Tveite Bystøl, ski mountaineer
- 20 November – Espen Hoff, footballer
- 30 November – Belinda Braza, singer, choreographer, artist and actor

=== December ===
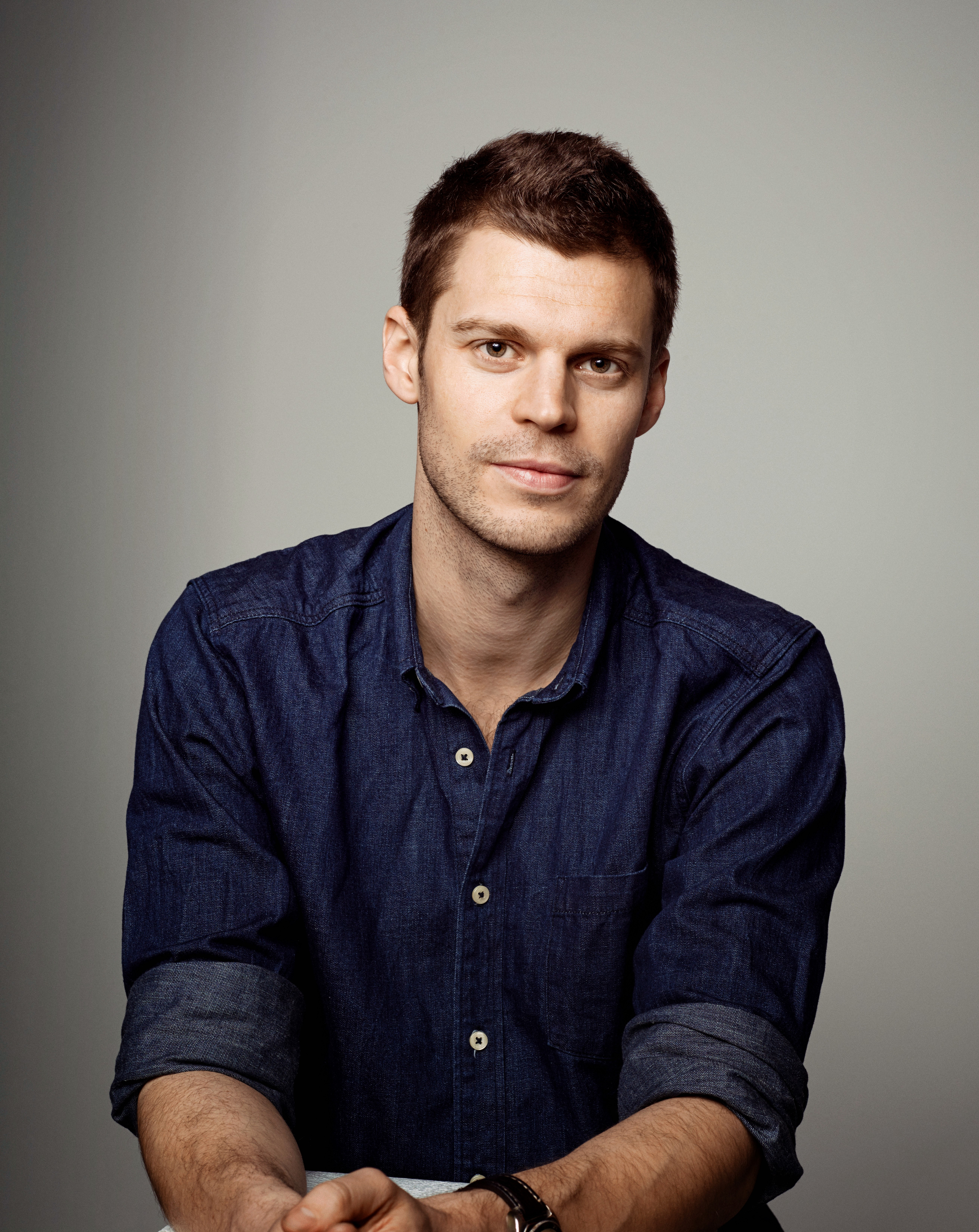
Bjørnar Moxnes

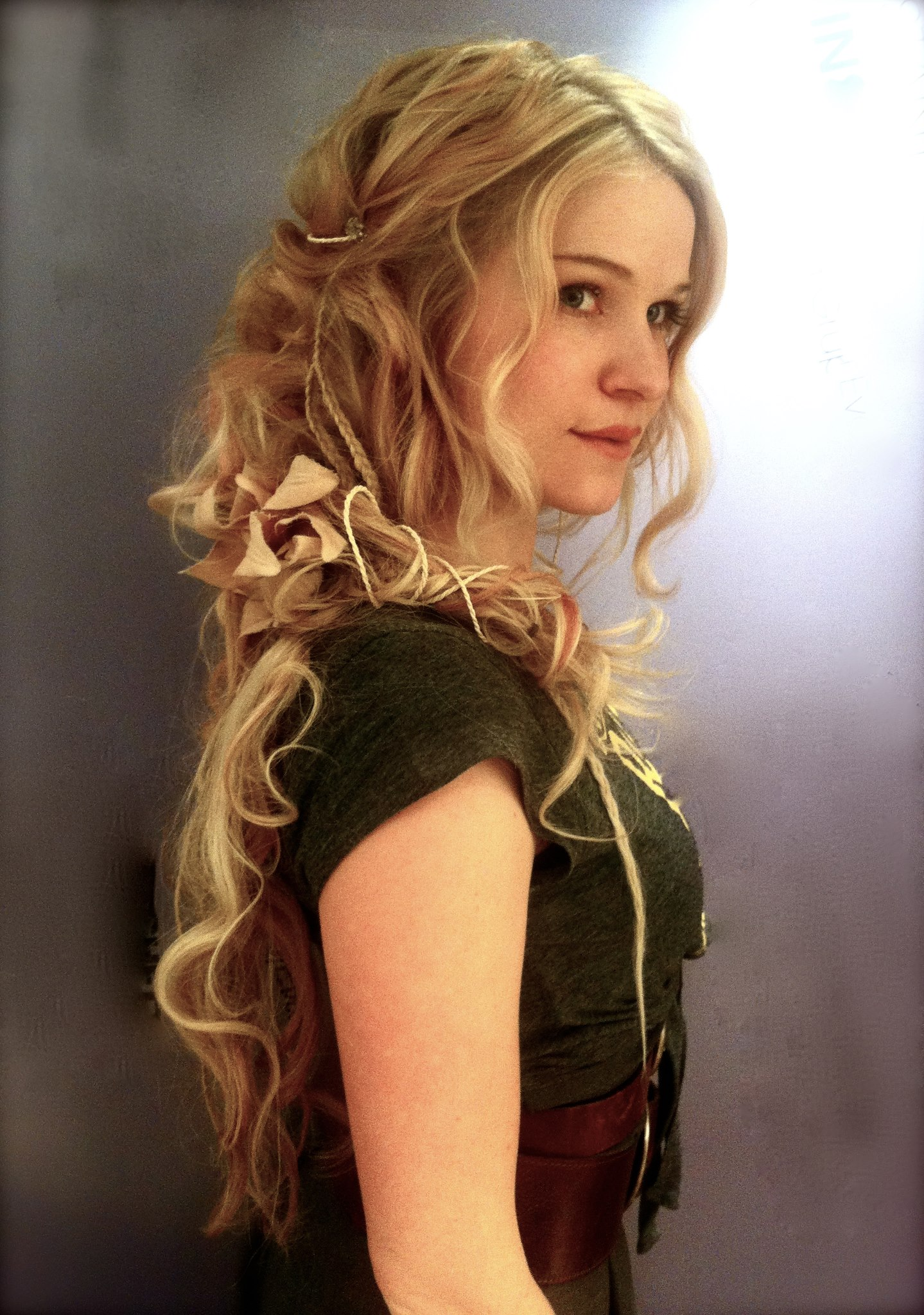
Solveig Heilo

- 6 December – Morten Værnes, ice sledge hockey player
- 17 December – Kim Myhr, guitarist and composer
- 19 December – Bjørnar Moxnes, politician
- 19 December – Espen Nystuen, footballer
- 20 December – John Olav Nilsen, singer and songwriter
- 24 December – Solveig Heilo, composer, artist, musician, music producer, arranger, designer and costume designer

=== Full date missing ===
- Lars Akerhaug, journalist and non-fiction author
- Ivar Loe Bjørnstad, jazz and rock musician
- Marius Bjugan, orienteering competitor
- Ida Hegazi Høyer, writer
- Annette Münch, children's writer, playwright and non-fiction writer.
- Øystein Kvaal Østerbø, orienteering competitor.
- Kjersti Reenaas, ski-orienteering competitor
- Julian Skar, composer and multi-media artist
- Todd Terje, DJ, songwriter, and record producer

== Notable deaths ==
=== January to March ===
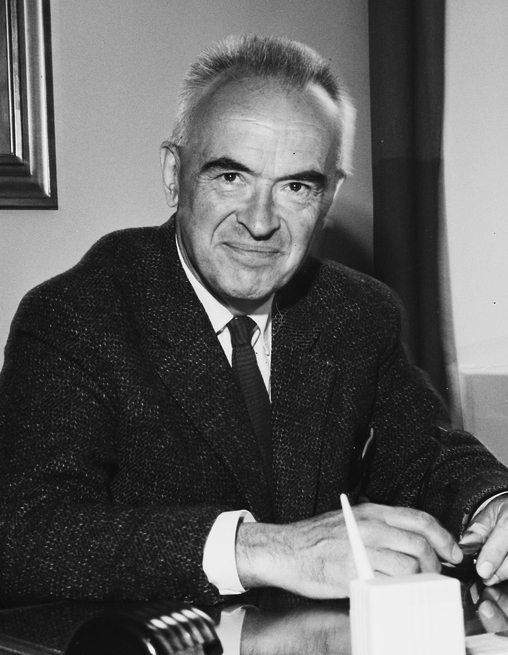
Karl Evang

- 3 January – Karl Evang, physician and civil servant (born 1902).
- 4 January – Aage Thor Falkanger Sr., judge (born 1902)
- 9 January – Jack Nielsen, tennis player (born 1896)
- 12 January – Olav Marensius Strandås, politician (born 1900)
- 16 January – Birger Haug, high jumper (born 1908)
- 20 January – Richard Frydenlund, wrestler (born 1891)
- 22 January – Torgeir Svendsen, politician (born 1910).
- 29 January – Karl Ludvig Bugge, civil servant (born 1902)
- 1 February – Geirr Tveitt, composer and pianist (born 1908)
- 11 February – Haakon Olsen Wika, politician (born 1899)
- 12 February – Trygve de Lange, lawyer (born 1918)
- 21 February – Julla Sæthern, barrister, feminist, politician (born 1901).
- 11 March – Jonas Enge, politician (born 1908)
- 30 March – Christian L. Holm, politician (born 1892)

=== April to June ===
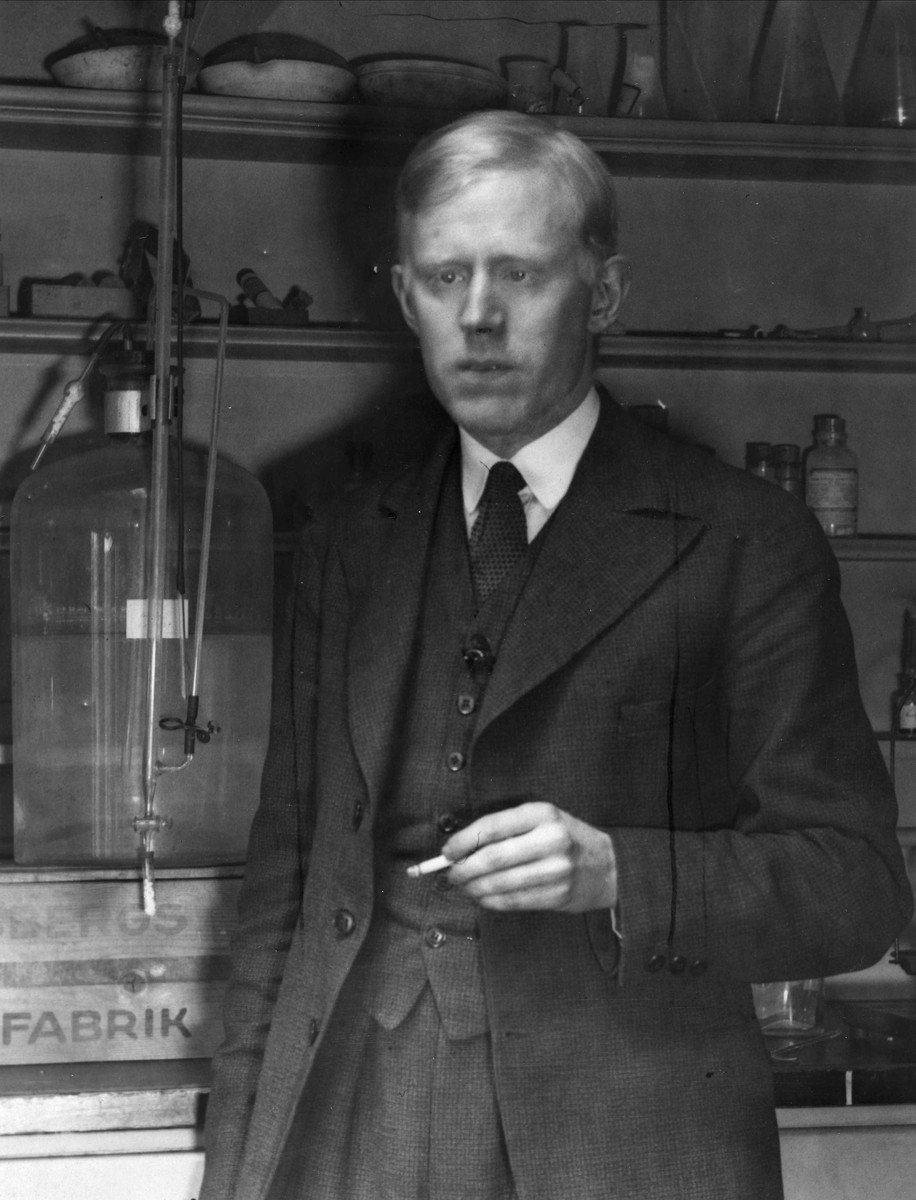
Odd Hassel, Nobel laureate in chemistry.

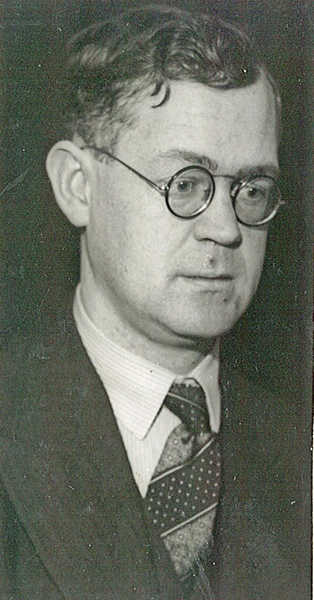
Henry Imsland

- 4 April – Aanund Bjørnsson Berdal, engineer (born 1888).
- 15 April – Birger Brekke, Scout leader (born 1891)
- 15 April – Anton Fredrik Klaveness, equestrian and ship-owner (born 1903)
- 28 April – Kristian Horn, botanist and humanist (born 1903)
- 5 May – Rolf Bloch Hansen, military officer and skiing official (born 1894)
- 9 May – Rolf Just Nilsen, singer and actor (born 1931)
- 11 May – Odd Hassel, physical chemist and Nobel Laureate (born 1897)
- 18 May – Ola Høyland, politician (born 1890)
- 22 May – Reimar Riefling, classical pianist, music teacher, and music critic (born 1898)
- 23 May – Johan Georg A. Ræder, diplomat (born 1905)
- 29 May – Mette Lange-Nielsen, actress (born 1929)
- 7 June – Lars Johan Danbolt, priest (born 1895)
- 7 June – Asbjørn Listerud, politician (born 1905)
- 11 June – Kristian Østby, naval aviator (born 1900)
- 14 June – Henry Imsland, illustrator (born 1900)
- 22 June – Petter Hol, gymnast (born 1883)
- 25 June – Otto Hjersing Munthe-Kaas, politician, businessman and military officer (born 1883)

=== July to September ===
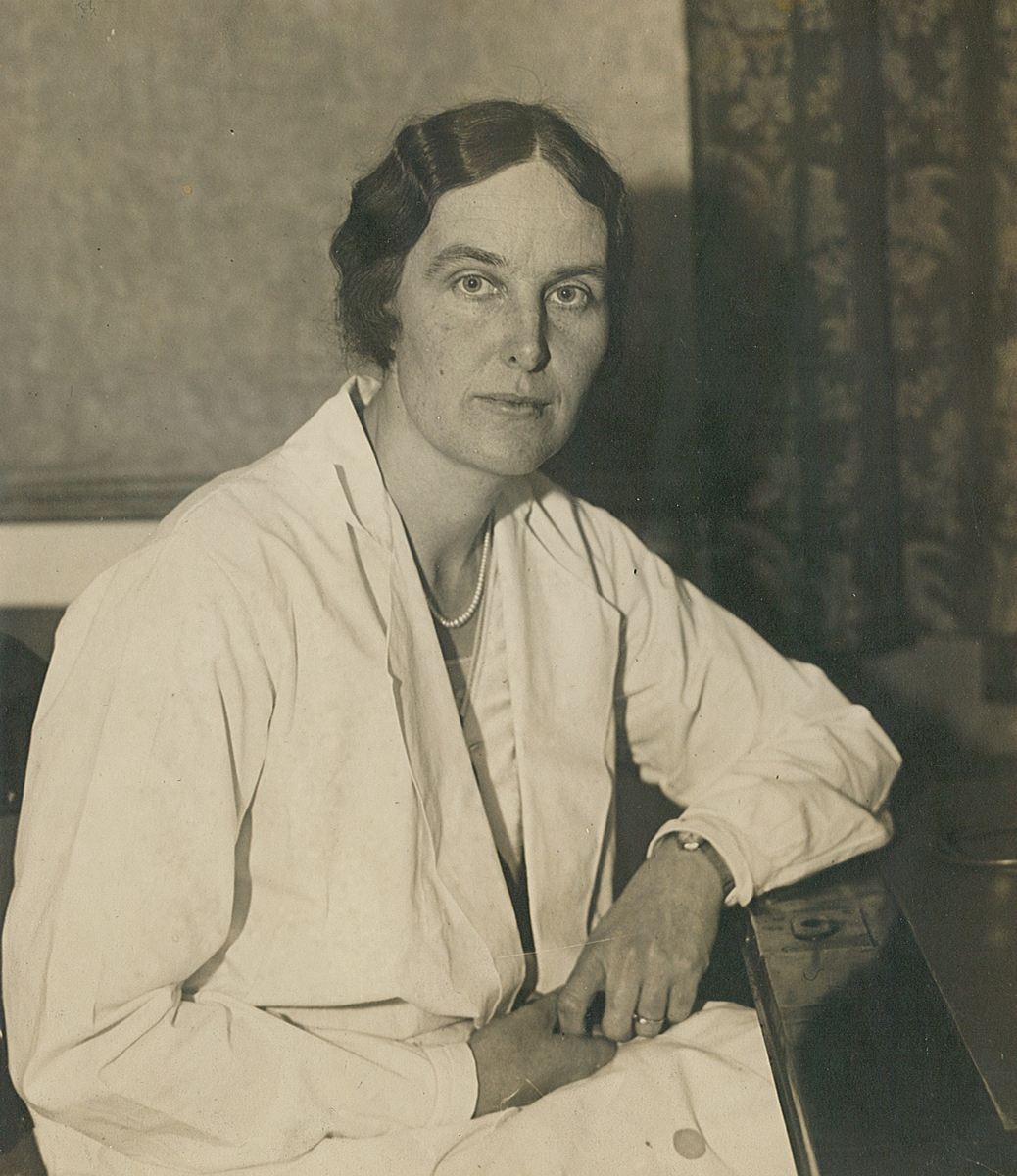
Tove Mohr

- 5 July – Olav Larssen, newspaper editor and politician (born 1894)
- 6 July – Kaare Fostervoll, educator and politician (born 1891)
- 9 July – Nikolai Paul Kornelius Molvik, politician (born 1905)
- 19 July – John Aalmo, (born 1902)
- 31 July – Christian Stray, lawyer and politician (born 1894)
- 2 August – Kåre Norum, educator (born 1907).
- 11 August – Arne Skaare, politician (born 1907)
- 15 August – Jørgen Løvset, professor of medicine, gynecology and obstetrics (born 1896)
- 25 August – Jens Gram Dunker, architect (born 1892)
- 26 August – Tove Mohr, physician and proponent for women's rights (born 1891)
- 28 August – Bjarne Fjærtoft, politician (born 1899)
- 11 September – Erling Østerberg, police officer (born 1901).
- 26 September – Jens Edv. Haugland, politician (born 1924)

=== October to December ===
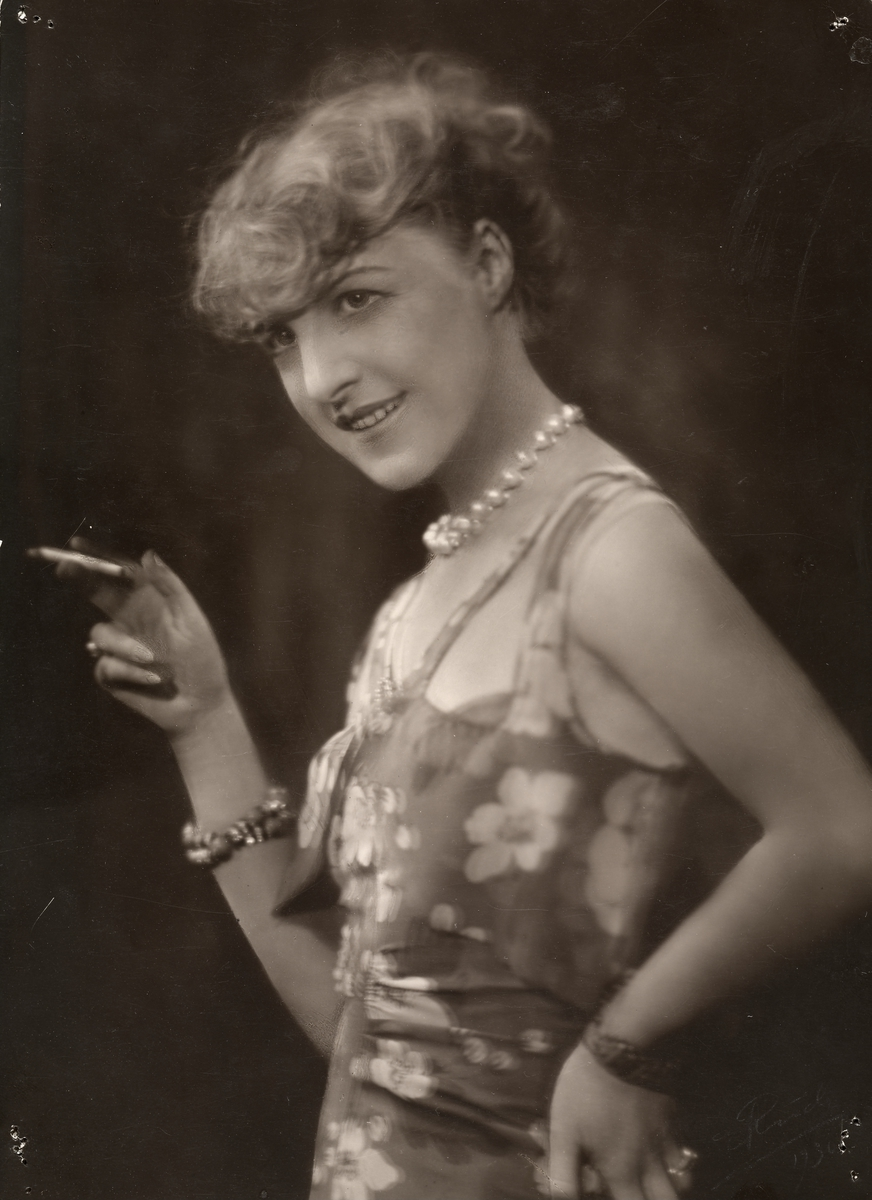
Ada Kramm

- 9 October – Per Arneberg, poet, prosaist and translator (born 1901)
- 26 October – Olaf Sunde, lawyer and workers' rights activist (born 1915)
- 31 October – Bent Røiseland, politician (born 1902)
- 4 November – Sverre Helgesen, high jumper (born 1903)
- 25 November Sigbjørn Hølmebakk, author (born 1922)
- 17 December – Ada Kramm, stage and film actress (born 1899)
- 18 December – Olav Rasmussen Langeland, politician (born 1904)

=== Full date unknown ===
- Alf-Jørgen Aas, painter (born 1915)
- Tor Hermod Refsum, painter (born 1894)
- Knut Robberstad, jurist and philologist (born 1899)
