= 1907 in Norway =

- Centuries: 18th; 19th; 20th; 21st
- Decades: 1880s; 1890s; 1900s; 1910s; 1920s
- See also: List of years in Norway

Events in the year 1907 in Norway.

== Incumbents ==
- Monarch – Haakon VII.
- Prime Minister – Christian Michelsen

== Events ==
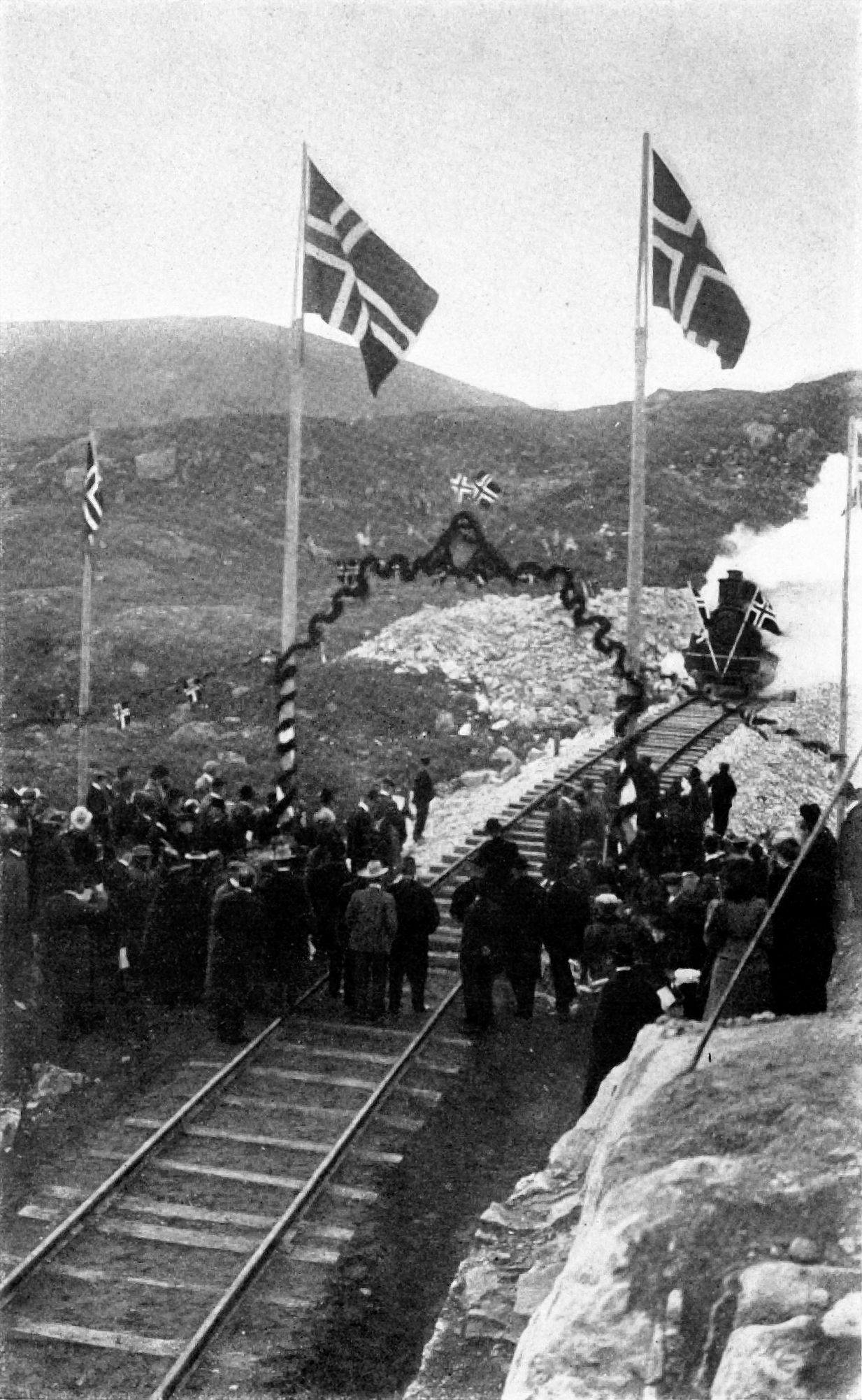
The ceremony at the completion of the Bergen Line at Ustaoset.

- 14 June – Norway adopts female suffrage in parliamentary elections.
- Norsk Hydro, having been founded in 1905, opens up its first plant in Notodden Municipality.
- Municipal and county elections are held throughout the country.
- The construction of the Bergen Line is completed.

== Popular culture ==
=== Literature ===
- The first Olav Duun novel Løglege skruvar og anna folk (Sogor) (Oddballs and Other People (Stories)) was published.

== Notable births ==
- 5 January – Sunniva Hakestad Møller, politician (died 1995)
- 9 January – Haakon Hansen, boxer (died 1985)
- 14 January – Christian S. Oftedal, politician (died 1955)
- 16 January – Arne Skaare, politician (died 1981)
- 4 February – Eva Lund Haugen, author and editor in America (died 1996)
- 5 February – Birgit Dalland, politician (died 2007)
- 24 February – Karl Valdemar Westerlund, politician (died 1997)
- 27 February – Øistein Jakobsen, politician (died 1947)
- 2 March – Kai Fjell, painter, printmaker and scenographer (died 1989)
- 8 March – Rolf Jacobsen, writer (died 1994)
- 13 March – Ingvald Bjerke, boxer (died 1990)
- 16 March – Hans Kleppen, ski jumper and Olympic bronze medallist (died 2009)
- 19 March – Arthur Olsen II, boxer (died 1943)
- 29 March – Berte Rognerud, politician (died 1997)
- 3 April – Lars Breie, jurist, auditor and politician (died 1999)
- 10 April – Aase Lionæs, politician (died 1999)
- 16 April – Axel Proet Høst, lawyer and sports executive (died 1985).
- 5 May – Haakon Hansen, politician (died 1971)
- 18 May – Lars Amandus Aasgard, politician (died 1984)
- 20 May – Per Lie, labour activist (died 1945)
- 26 May – Gerda Grepp, war correspondent (died 1940).
- 27 May – Carl Falck, businessman (died 2016)
- 28 June – Odd Bull, air force officer, Chief of Air Staff (died 1991)
- 31 July – Sigurd Vestad, cross country skier (died 2001)
- 10 August – Ragnvald Marensius Gundersen, politician (died 1985)
- 16 August – Edvard Natvig, decathlete (died 1994)
- 22 August – Einar Normann Rasmussen, politician (died 1975)
- 25 August – Wilhelm Engel Bredal, politician (died 1966)
- 13 September – Oskar Slaaen, politician (died 1972)
- 18 October – Einar Høigård, educator (died 1943).
- 19 October – Kristian Birger Gundersen, politician (died 1977)
- 26 October – Martha Frederikke Johannessen, politician (died 1973)
- 14 November – Kåre Norum, educator (died 1981).
- 19 November – Gunnar Halle, engineer and military officer.
- 25 December – Kristian Johansson, ski jumper and World Champion
- 30 December – Sigmund Ruud, ski jumper, Olympic silver medallist and World Champion (died 1994).

=== Full date unknown ===
- Ørnulf Bast, sculptor (died 1974)
- Per Bratland, newspaper editor (died 1988)
- Thorbjørn Feyling, ceramist and designer (died 1985)
- Nils Langhelle, politician and Minister (died 1967)
- Knut Tjønneland, politician (died 2002)
- Olav Torpp, traffic engineer and civil servant (died 1993)

== Notable deaths ==
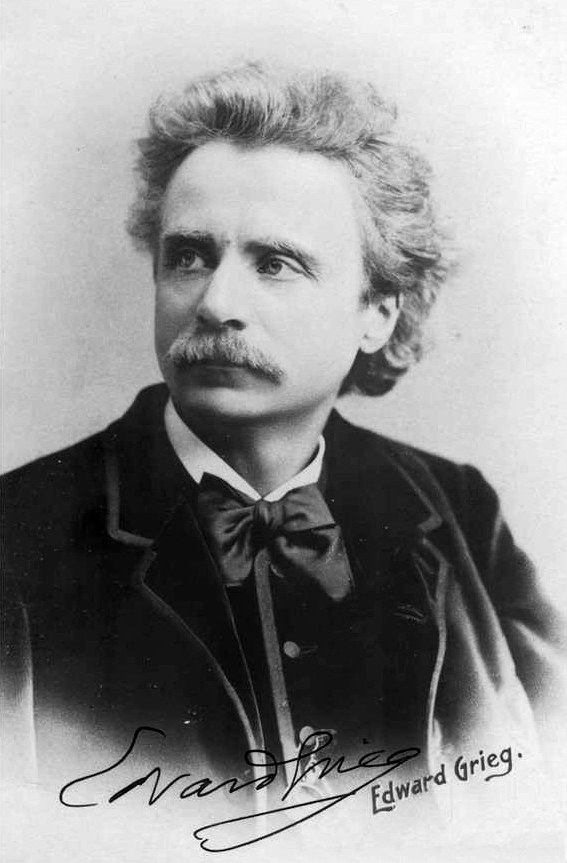
Edvard Grieg

- 19 April – Ole Vollan, educator, editor and politician (born 1837)
- 3 May – Georg Sverdrup, theologian and educator (born 1848)
- 4 June – Agathe Backer Grøndahl, pianist and composer (born 1847).
- 8 July – Sophus Bugge, philologist (born 1833)
- 4 September – Edvard Grieg, composer and pianist (born 1843)
- 5 September – Adolf Østbye, revue artist, made the first Norwegian gramophone record (born 1868)
- 11 September – Hans Georg Jacob Stang, politician and Minister (born 1858)

=== Full date unknown ===
- Hans Hagerup Krag, engineer (born 1829)
- Hans Georg Jacob Stang, politician and Prime Minister (born 1830)
