= 1905 in Norway =

- Centuries: 18th; 19th; 20th; 21st
- Decades: 1880s; 1890s; 1900s; 1910s; 1920s
- See also: 1905 in Sweden; List of years in Norway

Events in the year 1905 in Norway.

== Overview ==
1905 is the year when Norway regained its independence after the dissolution of the Union between Sweden and Norway. For the first time since 1397 Norway had a national king, after 500 years of political unions with other Scandinavia countries – the Kalmar Union until 1532, then the united kingdoms of Denmark–Norway until 1814, and finally a personal union with Sweden until 1905. The article Dissolution of the union between Norway and Sweden in 1905 covers the events surrounding the break with Sweden in depth.

== Incumbents ==
- Monarch – Oscar II (until 26 October),
  Vacant (26 October to 18 November),
  Haakon VII (after 18 November).
- Prime Minister: Francis Hagerup (until 11 March), then Christian Michelsen

== Events ==
- 15 January – A major rockfall hit the lake Loenvatnet in Sogn og Fjordane, creating a 40 m (130 ft) flood wave that destroyed the villages of Ytre Nesdal and Bødal, killing 61 people.
- 7 June – The Norwegian Parliament declares the union with Sweden dissolved, and Norway achieves full independence
- 23 September – Norway and Sweden sign the "Karlstad treaty", peacefully dissolving the Union between the two countries.
- 16 October – Union resolution for 1905 : After the warmongering and hard negotiations was the Norwegian union with Sweden formally dissolved when the Swedish parliament recognized Norway as a separate state.
- 26 October – Norway was recognized by Sweden as an independent constitutional monarchy.
- 12 November – a referendum confirmed the monarchy and rejected a republican form of government.
- 18 November – The Norwegian Parliament unanimously elected the Danish Prince Carl to be king (which was named King Haakon VII).
- 25 November – Haakon VII and his family arrived in Christiania (present-day Oslo).
- 2 December – Norsk hydro-elektrisk Kvælstofaktieselskab, later known simply as Norsk Hydro, is founded
The Norwegian Storting passes the "revolutionary" resolution.

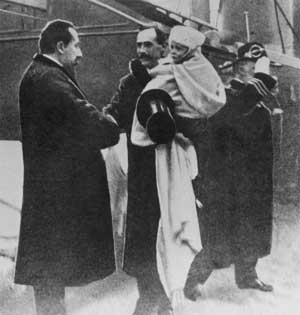
King Haakon and crown prince Olav arrive in Norway for the first time in 1905 and are greeted by Prime Minister Christian Michelsen

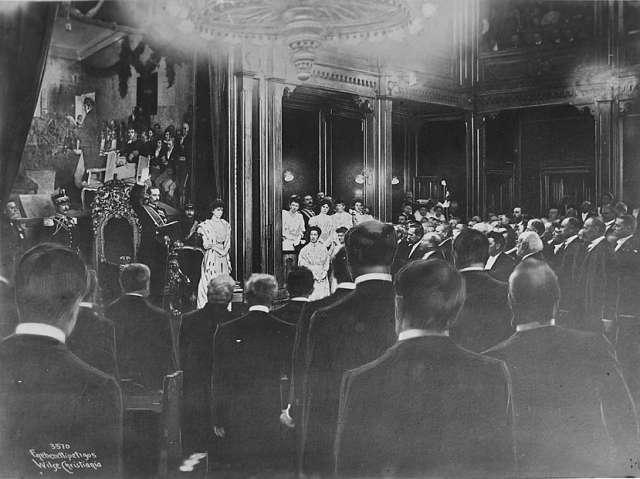
The swearing in of king of Haakon VII in the Parliament of Norway Building.

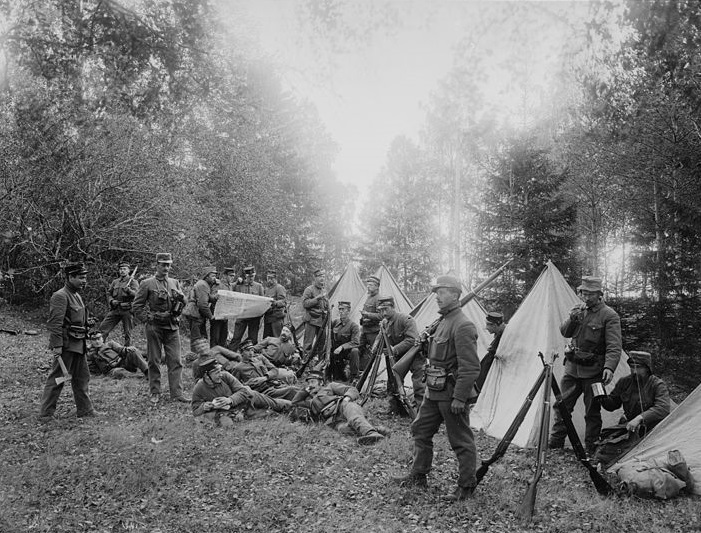
Norwegian soldiers guarding the border with Sweden, September 1905

== Popular culture ==
=== Literature ===
- The Knut Hamsund novel Stridende Liv. Skildringer fra Vesten og Østen was published.
- The last Alexander Kielland essay, Omkring Napoleon (On Napoleon), was published.

== Births ==
=== January to March ===
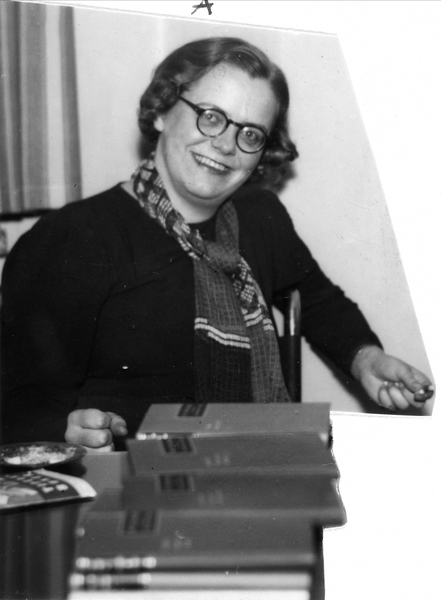
Nic Waal

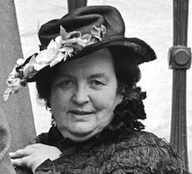
Zinken Hopp

- 1 January – Kaare Sundby, engineer, resistance member, executed (died 1945)
- 1 January – Lise Lindbæk, war correspondent (died 1961).
- 1 January – Nic Waal, psychiatrist (died 1960).
- 6 January – Asbjørn Listerud, politician (died 1981)
- 9 January – Zinken Hopp, writer (died 1987).
- 15 January – Marius Sandvei, linguist, educator and language politician (died 1993).
- 17 January – Øivind Jensen, boxer (died 1989)
- 17 January – Elling M. Solheim, writer (died 1971).
- 23 January – Torger Hovi, politician (died 1980)
- 1 February – Øivind Bolstad, playwright and novelist (died 1979).
- 7 February – Erling Fredriksfryd, politician (died 1977)
- 19 February – Birger Halvorsen, high jumper (died 1976)
- 22 February – Elling Enger, composer, organist, and choir conductor (died 1979)
- 4 March – Per Mørch Hansson, businessman (died 1994).
- 10 March – Tormod Normann, lawyer, competitive swimmer and sports administrator (died 1974).

=== April to June ===
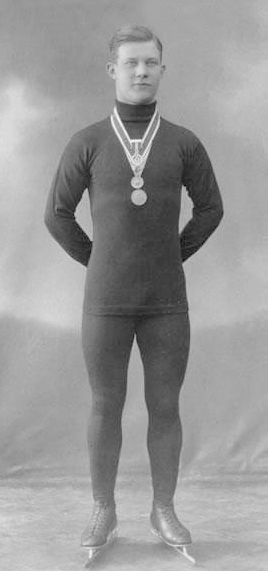
Bernt Evensen

- 4 April – Arne Randers Heen, mountain climber (died 1991).
- 8 April – Bernt Evensen, speed skater, Olympic gold medallist and racing cyclist (died 1979)
- 12 April – Inger Hagerup, author, playwright and poet (died 1985).
- 13 April – Edgar Christensen, boxer (died 1977)
- 20 April – Sigurd Marcussen, politician
- 28 April – Ernst Fredrik Eckhoff, judge (died 1997)
- 29 April – Else Werring, royal hostess (died 1985).
- 30 April – Martin Skaaren, politician (died 1999)
- 4 May – Sverre Offenberg Løberg, politician (died 1976)
- 11 May – Randi Lindtner Næss, actress and singer (died 2009).
- 12 May – Arna Vågen, missionary and politician (died 2005)
- 18 May – Arndt Jorgens, baseball player in America (died 1980)
- 22 May – Eilif Åsbo, barrister, banker and politician (died 1973).
- 29 June – Andreas Honerød, politician (died 1965)

=== July to September ===
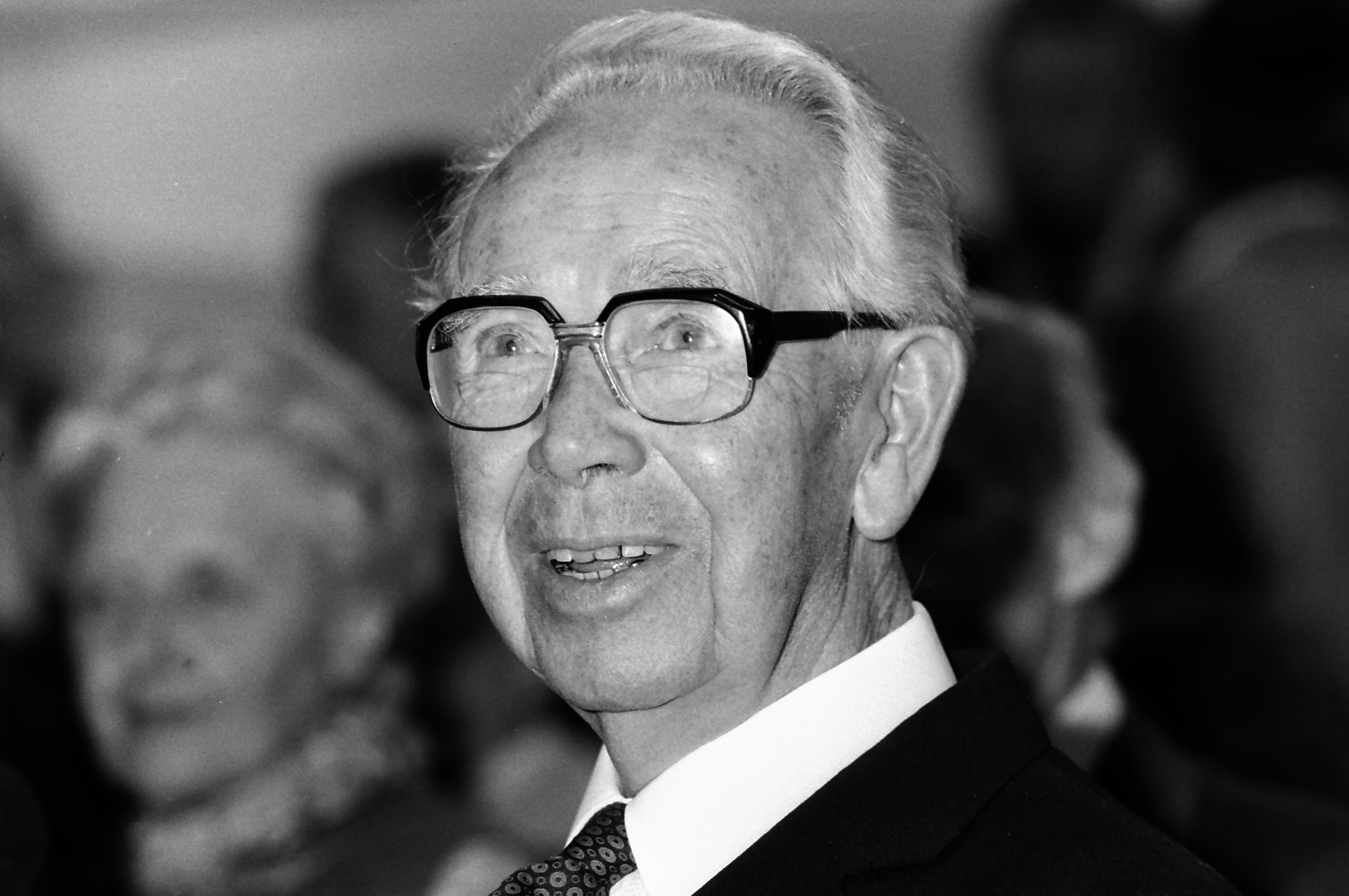
Harald Kihle

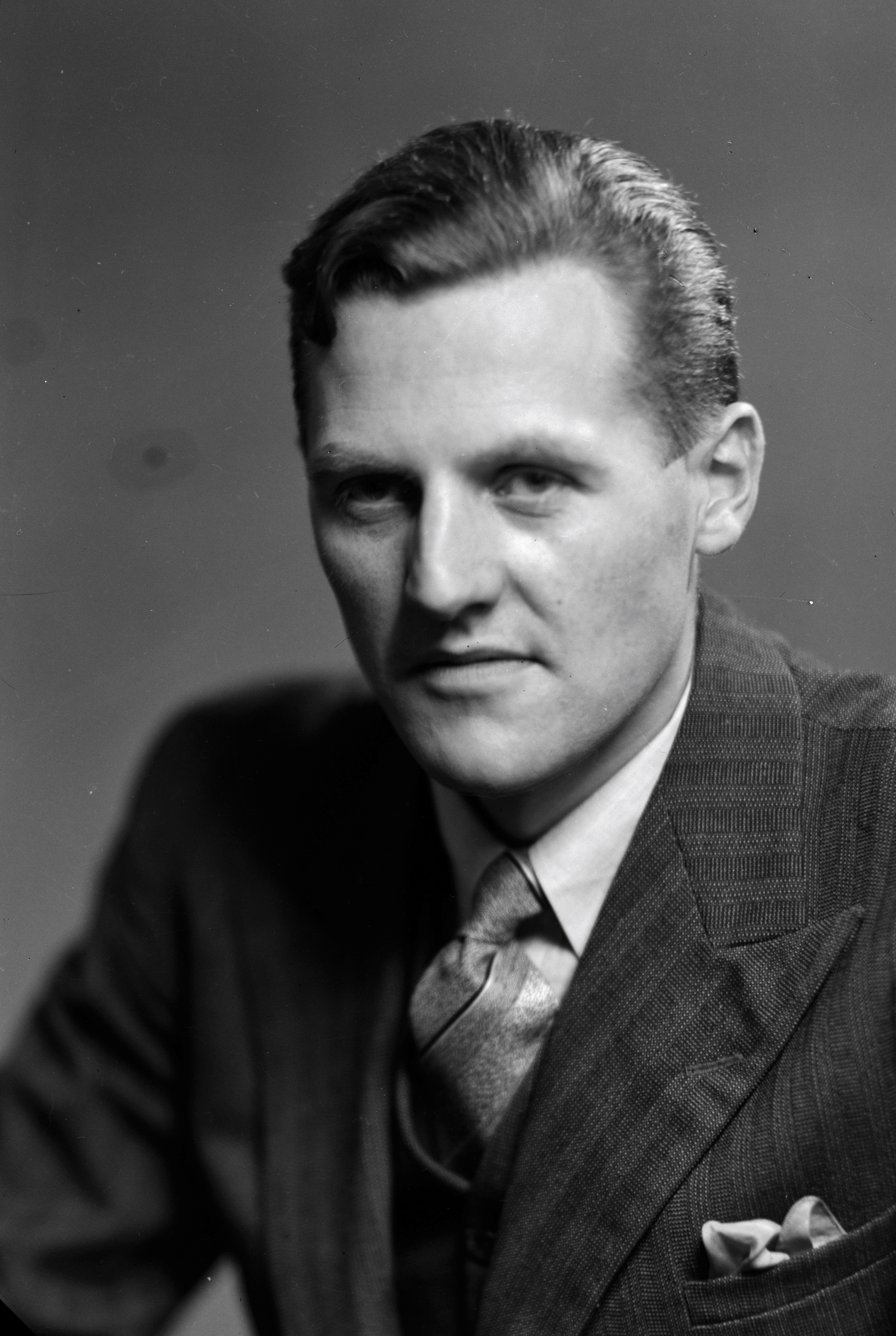
John Lyng

- 3 July – Harald Kihle, painter and illustrator (died 1997).
- 11 July – Tidemann Flaata Evensen, politician (died 1969)
- 8 August – Martin Mehren, businessperson and sportsperson (died 2002).
- 11 August – Finn Havrevold, writer and illustrator (died 1988).
- 13 August – Trygve Bull, politician (died 1999).
- 15 August – Christian Brinch, civil servant.
- 17 August – Per Thomsen, newspaper editor (died 1983).
- 20 August – Hans Vinjarengen, skier, Olympic silver medallist and World Champion (died 1984)
- 22 August – John Lyng, jurist and politician (died 1978).
- 3 September – Nils Kristian Lysø, politician and Minister (died 1977)
- 5 September – Gunnar Kalrasten, politician (died 1964)
- 22 September – Haakon Lie, politician (died 2009)

=== October to December ===
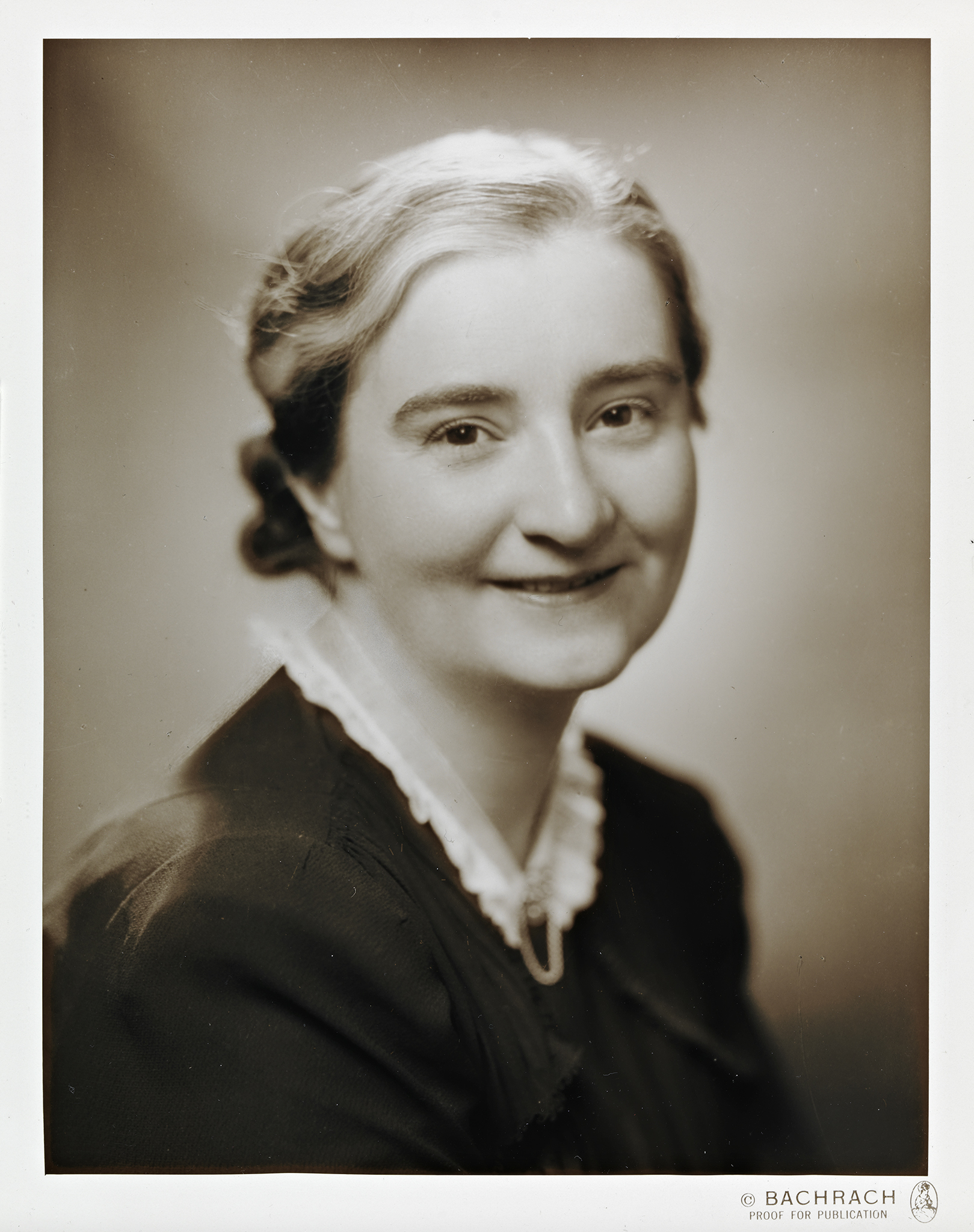
Åse Gruda Skard

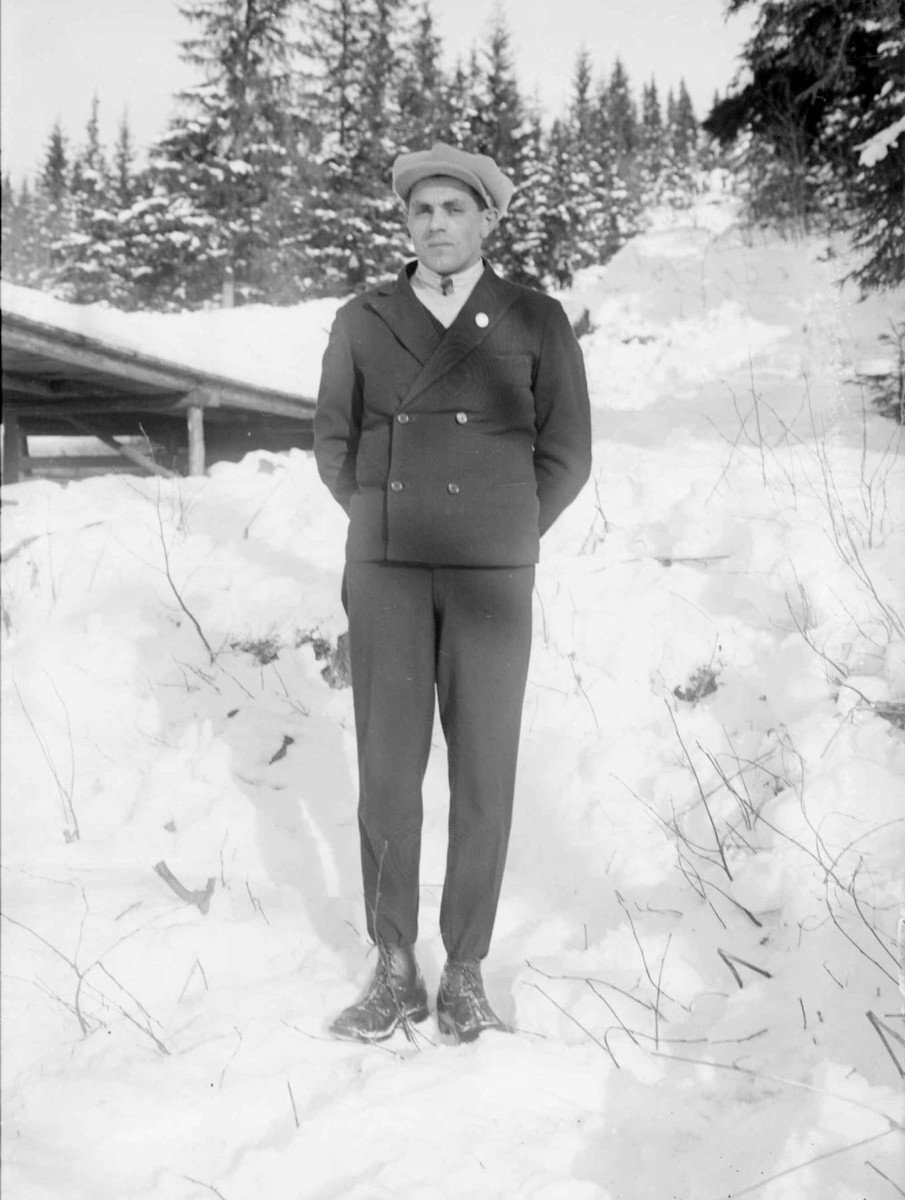
Arne Rustadstuen

- 7 October – Wilhelm Ljunggren, mathematician (died 1973).
- 11 October – Jens Arup Seip, historian (died 1992)
- 20 October – Armand Carlsen, speed skater (died 1969)
- 23 October – Kaleb Nytrøen, police officer (died 1994).
- 24 October – Kristian Hauger, pianist, orchestra leader and composer (died 1977).
- 7 November – Arthur Ruud, trade unionist, sports administrator (died 1974).
- 10 November – Håkon Robak, botanist (died 1982).
- 22 November – Einar Kristian Haugen, politician (died 1968)
- 2 December – Åse Gruda Skard, psychologist (died 1985).
- 7 December – Harald Throne-Holst, industrial leader (died 1986).
- 11 December – Willy Røgeberg, rifle shooter (died 1969)
- 12 December – Frode Rinnan, architect (died 1997).
- 14 December – Arne Rustadstuen, Nordic skier (died 1978).
- 18 December – Einar Karstad, architect (died 1982)

=== Full date unknown ===
- Trygve Brodahl, cross country skier (died 1996)
- Henrik Edland, veterinarian (died 1984)
- Håkon Flood, professor of inorganic chemistry (died 2001)
- Gard Holtskog, jurist and NS civil servant (died 1987).
- Gudrun Augusta Larsen, writer (died 1957).
- Sven Oftedal, politician and Minister (died 1948)
- Erik Rolfsen, architect (died 1992)
- Jacob Vaage, historian and museum curator (died 1994)

== Deaths ==
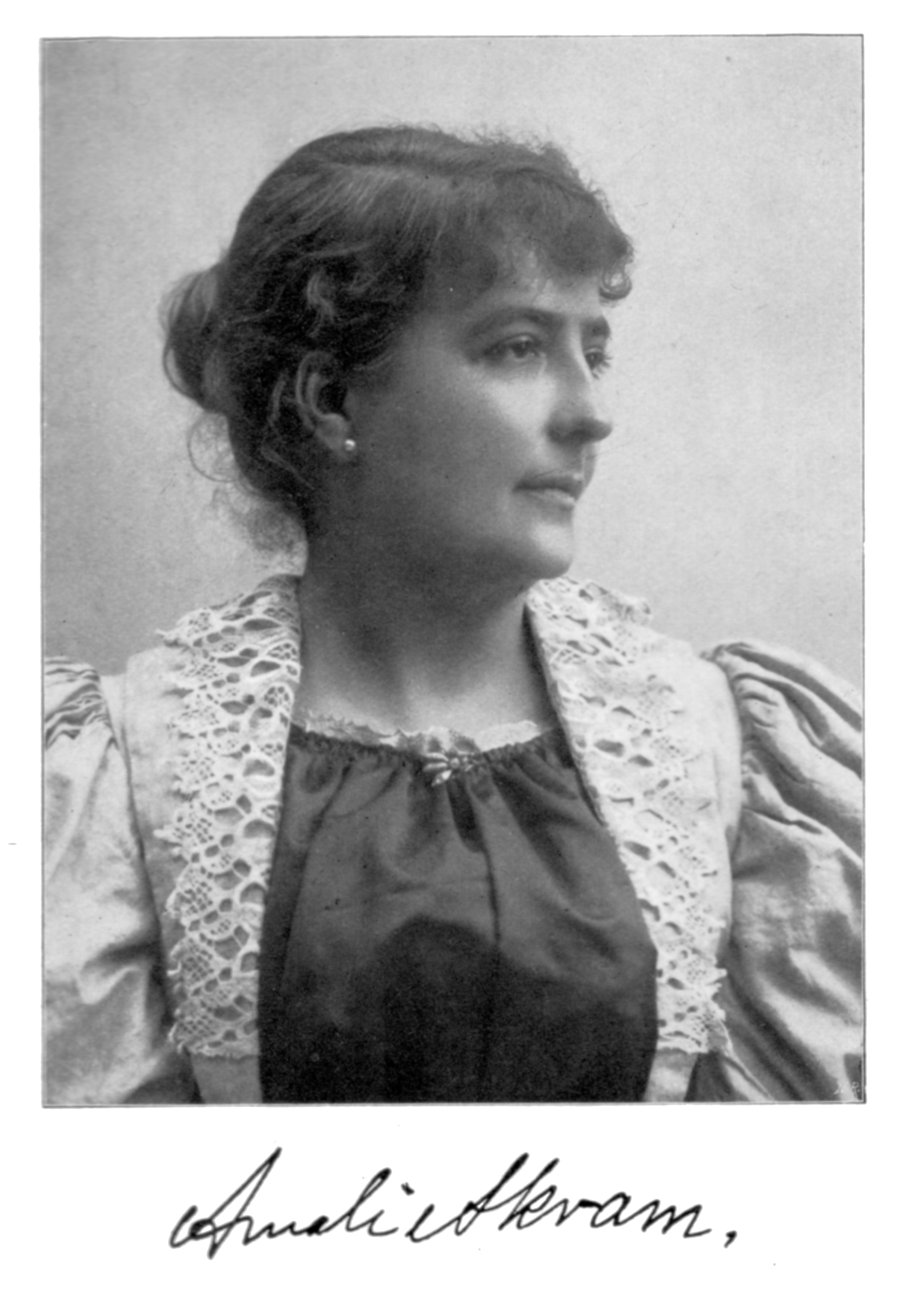
Amalie Skram

- 6 February – Niels Mathias Rye, politician (born 1824)
- 15 March – Amalie Skram, author and feminist (born 1846)
- 21 April – John Grieg, printer, publisher and bookseller (born 1856).
- 3 August – Thomas Engelhart, jurist, politician and civil servant (born 1850).
- 10 October – Per Savio, polar explorer and dog sled driver (born 1877).
- 30 November – Rasmus Flo, philologist, teacher and magazine editor (born 1851).

=== Full date missing ===
- Lars Lysgaard, railway engineer (born 1841).
