= 1908 in Norway =

- Centuries: 18th; 19th; 20th; 21st
- Decades: 1880s; 1890s; 1900s; 1910s; 1920s
- See also: List of years in Norway

Events in the year 1908 in Norway.

== Incumbents ==
- Monarch – Haakon VII.

== Popular culture ==
=== Sports ===
- 26 September – SK Brann football club is founded.
- Football Association of Norway joins FIFA.

=== Literature ===
- The Knut Hamsund novels Benoni and Rosa: Af Student Parelius' Papirer, was published.
- The Olav Duun novel Marjane was published.

== Births ==
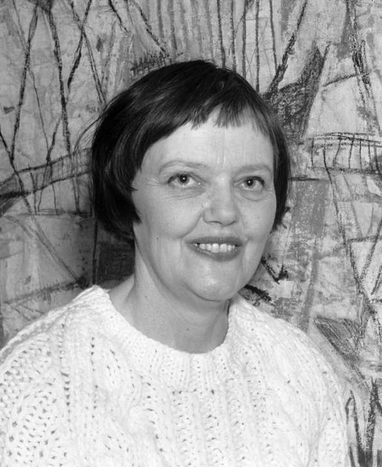
Synnøve Anker Aurdal

=== January to March ===
- 22 January – Kåre Hatten, cross-country skier (died 1983).
- 3 February – Ragna Johanne Forsberg, politician (died 1984)
- 3 February – Oddbjørn Hagen, skier, Olympic gold medallist and World Champion (died 1983)
- 4 February – Ellisiv Steen, literary scholar (d. 2001).
- 26 February – Einar Hovdhaugen, politician (died 1996)
- 15 March – Sverre Kolterud, Nordic combined skier (died 1996)
- 17 March – Oscar Christian Gundersen, politician and Minister (died 1991)
- 28 March – Hans Engnestangen, speed skater and World Champion (died 2003)

=== April to June ===
- 9 April – Odd Bang-Hansen, novelist and children's writer (died 1984)
- 10 April – Oskar Steinvik, politician (died 1975)
- 21 April – Nic. Stang, art historian and writer (died 1971)
- 24 April – Jonas Enge, politician (died 1981)
- 9 May – Lars Mathias Hille Esmark, civil servant and business person in the tourist industry (died 1998).
- 2 June – Michael Staksrud, speed skater and World Champion (died 1940)
- 6 June – Bjarne Eilif Thorvik, politician (died 1972)
- 19 June – Leo Tallaksen, politician (died 1983)
- 21 June – Erik Brofoss, economist, politician and Minister (died 1979)
- 28 June – Nini Haslund Gleditsch, political activist and advocate for peace (died 1996).
- 28 June – Olav Reiersøl, statistician and econometrician (died 2001)
- 29 June – Arne Berge, priest.
- 30 June – Thor Myklebust, politician (died 1989)

=== July to September ===
- 1 August – Gidsken Jakobsen, aviation pioneer (died 1990)
- 6 August – Arthur Klæbo, journalist (died 1985).
- 13 August – Nils Kristen Jacobsen, politician (died 1993)
- 17 August – Harald Selås, politician (died 1986)
- 18 August – Olav H. Hauge, poet (died 1994)
- 19 August – Birger Haug, high jumper (died 1981)
- 22 August – Synnøve Lie, speed skater (died 1980)
- 2 September – Olaf Hoffsbakken, Nordic skier, Olympic silver medallist and World Champion (died 1986).
- 23 September – Oscar Olsen, politician (died 2004)
- 24 September – Hans Borgen, politician (died 1983)

=== October to December ===
- 19 October – Geirr Tveitt, composer and pianist (died 1981)
- 4 November – Olaf Fredrik Watnebryn, politician (died 1977)
- 1 December – Torstein Olav Kuvaas, politician (died 1996)
- 8 December – Synnøve Anker Aurdal, textile artist (died 2000).
- 19 December – Gunnar Olram, actor and stage director (died 2001).
- 31 December – Carl Fredrik Wisløff, theologian and Christian preacher (died 2004)

=== Full date unknown ===
- Reidar Carlsen, politician and Minister (died 1987)
- Helmer Dahl, engineer (died 1999)
- Jens E. Ekornes, businessperson (died 1976)
- Nils Johan Rud, novelist, short story writer and magazine editor (died 1993)
- Rolf Ingvar Semmingsen, civil servant (died 1979)
- Oskar Skogly, politician and Minister (died 1988)

== Deaths ==
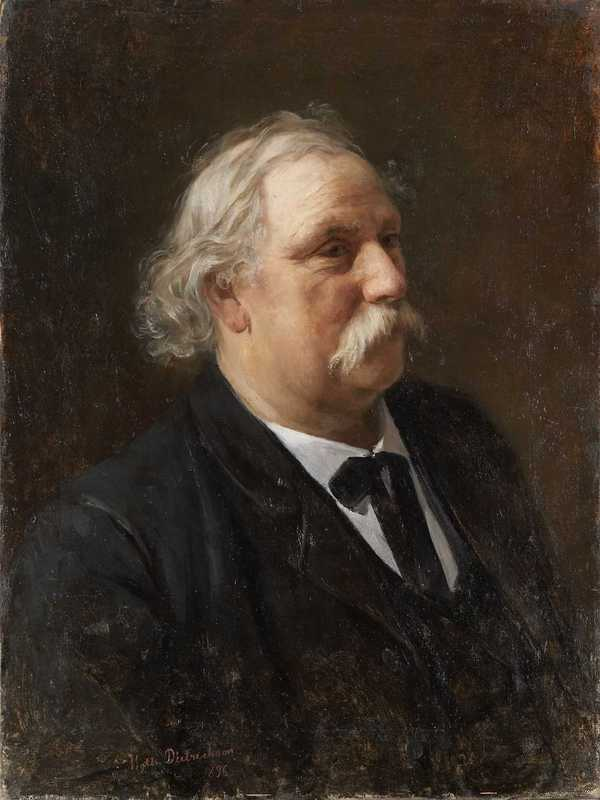
Knud Bergslien

- 28 January – Ragnhild Jølsen, author (born 1875)
- 13 April – Aasta Hansteen, painter, writer, and early feminist (born 1824)
- 2 June – Aimar August Sørenssen, politician and Minister (born 1823)
- 5 July – Jonas Lie, novelist (born 1833)
- 2 August – Jørgen Breder Faye, banker and politician (born 1823)
- 22 October – Esther Edler, actress (born 1884)
- 27 November – Knud Bergslien, painter and teacher (born 1827)

=== Full date unknown ===
- Lars Christian Dahll, politician and Minister (born 1823)
- Einar Løchen, jurist and politician (born 1850)
