= Haakon Hansen =

Haakon Hansen may refer to:

- Haakon Hansen (politician) (1907–1971), Norwegian politician
- Haakon Hansen (boxer) (1907–1985), Norwegian boxer
