= Holtet =

Holtet may refer to:

== Places ==
Norway

- Holtet, Østfold, a village in Halden municipality, Østfold county
- Holtet, Oslo, a village in Oslo municipality
  - Holtet (station), a rail station in Oslo
- Holtet, Troms, a village in Harstad municipality, Troms county

Other

- Holtet Nunatak, a nunatak in Palmer Land, Antarctica

== People ==
- Holtet (surname), a Danish family surname
