= Westerlund =

Westerlund may refer to:

- Westerlund 1, a star cluster
- Westerlund 2, a star cluster
- 2902 Westerlund, a Main-belt Asteroid

== People with the surname ==
- Alexander Westerlund (born 1985), Swedish architect, industrial and furniture designer
- Anna Westerlund (born 1989), Finnish footballer
- Bengt Westerlund (1921–2008), Swedish professor of astronomy
- Björn Westerlund (1912–2009), a Finnish businessman
- Carl Agardh Westerlund (1831–1908), Swedish malacologist
- Carl Julius Alvin Westerlund (1885–1952), Norwegian politician for the Labour Party
- Edvard Westerlund (1901–1982), Finnish wrestler
- Ernst Westerlund (1893–1961), Finnish sailor
- Erkka Westerlund (born 1957), previous head coach of the Finnish national men's ice hockey team
- Helena Larsdotter Westerlund (1799–1865), Swedish educator
- Janne Westerlund (born 1973), Finnish musician, songwriter and visual artist
- Kalle Westerlund (1897–1972), Finnish wrestler
- Karl Valdemar Westerlund (1907–1997), Norwegian politician for the Labour Party
- Majléne Westerlund Panke (born 1946), Swedish politician

== See also ==
- Vesterlund, surname
