= Berdal =

Berdal is a surname. Notable people with the surname include:

- Aanund Bjørnsson Berdal (1888–1981), Norwegian engineer
- Ingrid Bolsø Berdal (born 1980), Norwegian actress
- Mats Berdal (born 1965), Norwegian academic
- Mimi Berdal (born 1959), Norwegian lawyer and businessman

== See also ==
- Bernal (disambiguation)
