= Brønnøysund IL =

Norwegian sports club

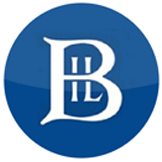
- Full name: Brønnøysund Idrettslag
- Nickname: BIL
- Founded: 1 September 1917
- Ground: Brønnøysund Stadion
- Capacity: 300 seats
- Chairman: Aina Melstein
- League: Fourth Division
- 2018: Third Division, 9th
Home colours

Brønnøysund Idrettslag is a Norwegian sports club from Brønnøysund, Nordland, founded on 1 September 1917. It has sections for association football, track and field, team handball, floorball, swimming, and gymnastics.

The men's football team currently plays in the Third Division, the fourth tier of Norwegian football. It last played in the Norwegian Second Division in 1999.

Former players include Tor Egil Horn, Bjørn Arve Lund and current Bodø/Glimt player Ulrik Saltnes.
