= Vesterlund =

Vesterlund is a Swedish surname. Notable people with the surname include:

- Jouko Vesterlund (born 1959), Finnish Olympic speed skater
- Lise Vesterlund, Danish-American economist
- Niklas Vesterlund (born 1999), Danish footballer
- Per Vesterlund, Swedish paralympic athlete

== See also ==
- Westerlund (disambiguation) § People with the surname
