= Tor Egil Horn =

Norwegian footballer (born 1976)

Tor Egil Moxness Horn (born 1 April 1976) is a former Norwegian football goalkeeper who played his entire professional career for Norwegian team FK Bodø/Glimt.

He joined Bodø/Glimt from Brønnøysund IL in 1996, made his Norwegian Premier League debut in 1997 and became the first-team regular in 2001. He retired in March 2007 due to a long time knee injury.
