= Holtet (surname) =

Coordinates: 58°52′42″N 11°32′04″E

The Holtet family, originating from Volstrup parish in Jutland, Denmark. A book, "The Holtet Family - A Family Genealogy" was written in 1932. Today, it is present on the Internet with a short translation into English. Also see the Danish Wiki about more exact details. Descendants have emigrated to the United States and Mexico.

== Notable people ==
- Cato Holtet (born 1963), Norwegian football striker
- Marius Holtet (born 1984), Norwegian ice hockey player
- Patrick Holtet (born 1981), Norwegian footballer
