= Øistein Jakobsen =

Norwegian politician

Øistein Jakobsen (27 February 1907 – 15 September 1947) was a Norwegian politician for the Liberal Party.

He served as a deputy representative to the Norwegian Parliament from Troms during the term 1945–1949. He died midway into the term.
