= Kristian Birger Gundersen =

Norwegian politician

Kristian Birger Gundersen (19 October 1907 – 27 May 1977) was a Norwegian politician for the Labour Party.

From 1967 to 1975 Gundersen was the mayor of Hamar. He had been a member of Hamar county council since 1952, and became deputy mayor in 1962.

He served as a deputy representative to the Norwegian Parliament from the Market towns of Hedmark and Oppland counties during the terms 1945–1949 and 1950–1953.
