= Torstein Olav Kuvaas =

Norwegian politician

Torstein Olav Kuvaas (1 December 1908 – 23 November 1996) was a Norwegian politician for the Liberal Party.

He served as a deputy representative to the Norwegian Parliament from Nordland during the terms 1950–1953, 1954–1957 and 1965–1969.
