= Arna Vågen =

Norwegian missionary and politician

Arna Vågen, née Espeland (12 May 1905 – 24 September 2005) was a Norwegian missionary and politician for the Christian Democratic Party.

She served as a deputy representative to the Norwegian Parliament from Oslo during the term 1961–1965.

Outside politics she was known for being a missionary to China. Her husband Trond Vågen was a long-time secretary general of the Norwegian Lutheran Mission.
