= Carl Falck =

Norwegian businessman and centenarian

- Born: Carl Wilhelm Andreas Falck; 27 May 1907; Tønsberg, Norway
- Died: 23 July 2016 (aged 109 years, 57 days); Oslo, Norway
- Education: University of Oslo
- Occupations: Businessman, CEO
- Known for: Norway's oldest living man

Carl Wilhelm Andreas Falck (27 May 1907 – 23 July 2016) was a Norwegian businessman, centenarian, and Norway's oldest living man. He was head of the wholesalers' organization Norges Grossistforbund from 1948 to 1975. At the age of 105, Falck became Norway's oldest man in 2012 and a subject of media interest.

== Early years and career ==
Falck was born in Tønsberg, South Norway to a bookseller and his wife. He got a master's degree in law (cand.jur.) in 1931 at the University of Oslo and subsequently held various positions as jurist in the Norwegian Police Service, a deputy judge (Norwegian: dommerfullmektig), assistant lawyer and as jurist in the Ministry of Social Affairs. After 1939, he mostly worked within various business organisations.

In 1948, he was named CEO of the wholesalers' organization Norges Grossist-forbund, (which in 1990 was merged into the Federation of Norwegian Enterprises). In this position and as part of the Marshall Plan, he spent two months in large cities in the US in 1952 to study the American wholesale industry. He became particularly interested in how the Americans kept stock in big one-level warehouses, as opposed to the Norwegian practice where stocks often were kept in narrow multilayer warehouses where ladders were needed to get the stocks in and out. Coming back to Norway, he advocated what he thought was the more effective American system. He published a book about structural changes in the wholesaler industry in 1969. He was a member of various Norwegian and European committees during his career.

== Elderly years and death ==
In 2012, at age 105, Falck became Norway's oldest man and since then was portrayed by various media outlets. Remaining in good health, he lived in his own home until 2012. when he moved into a nursing home in Oslo. He used to smoke until he was around 50. In his eighties, he started going to a gym, and later worked out daily at the nursing home.

In 2013, NRK published an article by Carl Falck titled "Some thoughts from Norway's oldest man" (Noen tanker fra Norges eldste mann) where he reflected upon his own life and how society had changed since he was born. The article was widely spread in social media. Commenting on the 2013 Norwegian parliamentary election, he noted that women didn't have the right to vote when he was born. He encouraged people to use their right to vote and declared he would vote the same party as he always had; he voted for the 43rd time in 2013.

His family lived at Eiksmarka for several years, then at Frogner. His wife died in 2010. He had children and grandchildren.

He died on 23 July 2016 at the age of 109 years, 57 days in Oslo.

== Publications ==
- Carl Falck: Strukturendringene i Varehandelen Og Virkningen for Industrien (1969), Grundt Tanum.
