= Einar Høigård =

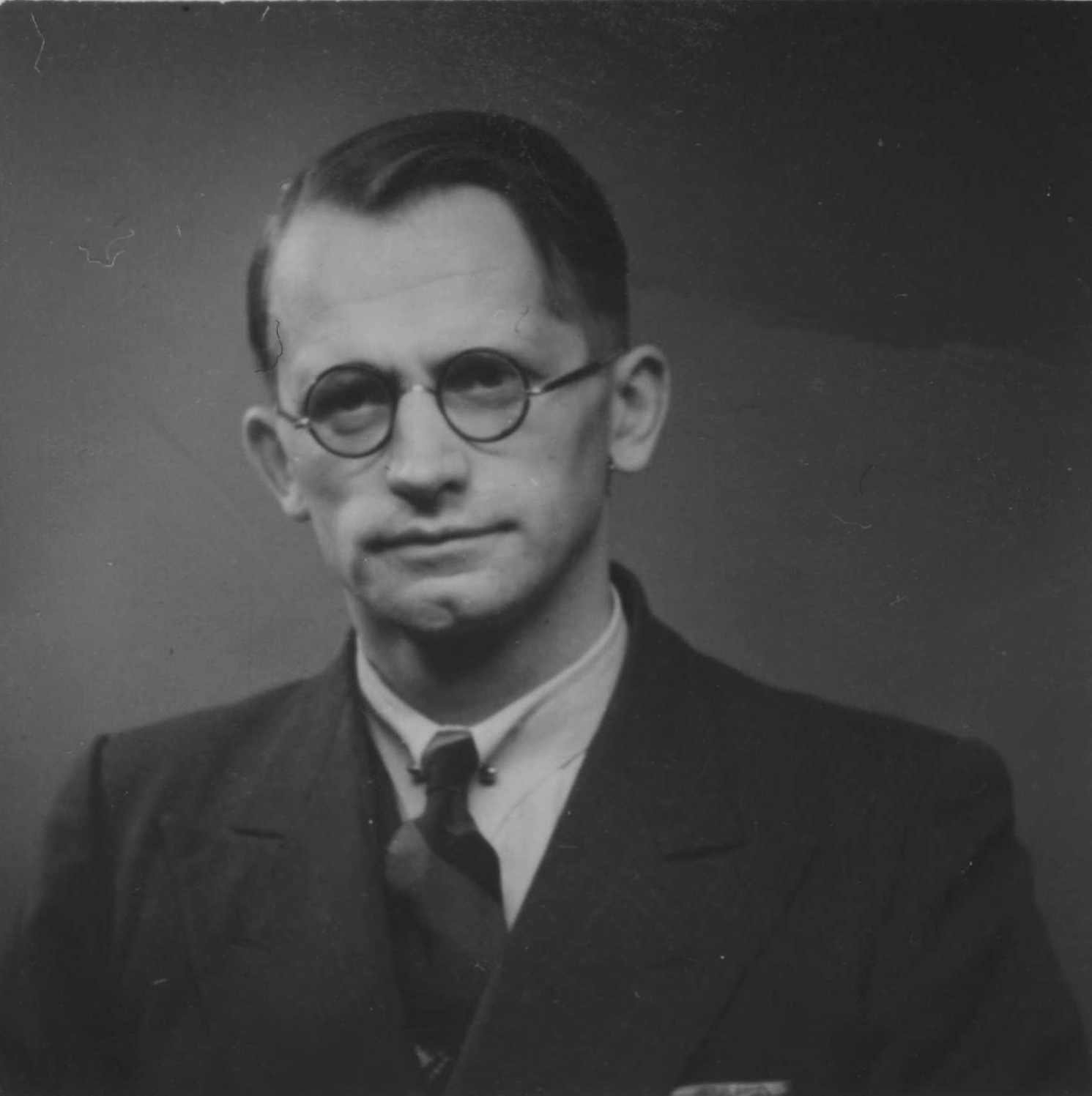
- Born: 18 October 1907; Stavanger, Norway
- Died: 25 November 1943 (aged 36)
- Occupation: educator

Einar Musæus Høigård (18 October 1907 – 25 November 1943) was a Norwegian educator and civil resistance member.

== Biography ==
Høigård was born in Stavanger, the son of Jonas Bernhard Høigård and Caroline Hansine Musæus. Among his works is a dissertation on Henrik Anker Bjerregaard from 1934 and a monograph on the history of Oslo Cathedral School from 1942. During the German occupation of Norway he played a central role in the teachers' resistance against Nazification of schools and youth organizations. He was arrested in 1943 during an escape attempt to Sweden, tortured by the Gestapo and committed suicide during interrogation.
