= Ragna Johanne Forsberg =

Norwegian politician

Ragna Johanne Forsberg (3 February 1908 – 4 September 1984) was a Norwegian politician for the Labour Party.

She served as a deputy representative to the Norwegian Parliament from Østfold during the terms 1958–1961 and 1961–1965.
