= Gard Holtskog =

Norwegian lawyer and Nazi civil servant

Gard Holtskog (born 1905, died 1987) was a Norwegian lawyer, and civil servant for the Nazi regime during the German occupation of Norway. He was installed as a board member at the Norwegian Broadcasting Corporation and at Nationaltheatret. He was later given the position of Police President of Finnmark, and assisted during the evacuation. He had an unpredictable behaviour. While in Finnmark he personally took part in torture and executions. During the legal purge he was sentenced to life in prison with hard labor, but was released in November 1957.

Holtskog died in 1987.
