= Lars Mathias Hille Esmark =

Lars Mathias Hille Esmark (9 May 1908 – 18 July 1998) was a Norwegian civil servant and business person in the tourist industry.

He was born in Voss Municipality, and graduated as cand.jur. in 1932. From 1935 he was appointed hotel inspector for the government. In this position he was responsible for deciding which overnight accommodations that qualified as hotels. After World War II he was appointed the government's tourist manager. From 1964 he was manager of the travel agency Bennett Reisebureau. He was a board member of the Norwegian Trekking Association, and eventually also chairman of the organization. He was decorated Knight, First Class of the Order of St. Olav in 1961. He was Knight of the Order of the Dannebrog and of the Order of the Polar Star.
