= Einar Kristian Haugen =

Norwegian politician

Einar Kristian Haugen (born 22 November 1905 – 12 March 1968) was a Norwegian politician for the Labour Party.

He served as a deputy representative to the Norwegian Parliament from Vestfold during the terms 1950–1953,1954–1957 and 1958–1961.
