= Nikolai Paul Kornelius Molvik =

Norwegian politician

Nikolai Paul Kornelius Molvik (28 August 1905 – 9 July 1981) was a Norwegian politician for the Christian Democratic Party.

He was born in Herøy Municipality.

He was elected to the Norwegian Parliament from Bergen in 1965, but was not re-elected in 1969. He had previously served in the position of deputy representative during the term 1958–1961, for Møre og Romsdal.

Molvik was involved in local politics in Volda Municipality, Ålesund Municipality, Kristiansund Municipality, and Bergen Municipality.
