= Eilif Åsbo =

Norwegian lawyer and politician

- Born: 22 May 1905; Sandnes, Norway
- Died: 13 December 1973 (aged 68)
- Occupations: barrister, banker and politician.
- Awards: Order of St. Olav

Eilif Åsbo (22 May 1905 – 13 December 1973) was a Norwegian barrister, Banker and politician.

== Personal life ==
Åsbo was born in Sandnes to lecturer and school principal Einar Aas (not to be confused with Einar Jan Aas, the football player) and Margrethe Viker. He married Berit Pedersen in 1937.

== Career ==
Åsbo served as director of Vestlandsbanken from 1956 to 1972. He was elected deputy representative to the Storting for the period 1961–1965 for the Centre Party from the constituency of Hordaland.. He was decorated Knight, First Class of the Order of St. Olav in 1968.
