= Bjarne Eilif Thorvik =

Norwegian politician (1908–1972)

Bjarne Eilif Thorvik (6 June 1908 - 7 June 1972) was a Norwegian politician for the Labour Party.

He served as a deputy representative to the Norwegian Parliament from Østfold during the terms 1954–1957 and 1958–1961.
