= Leo Olsen =

Norwegian footballer (born 1981)

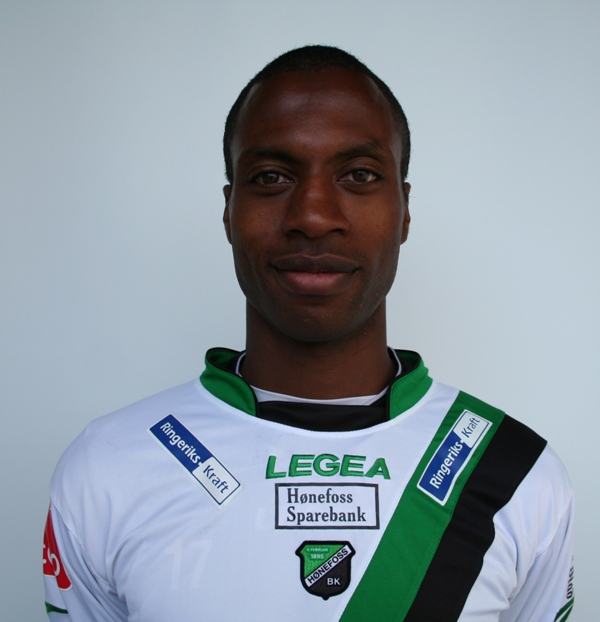

Personal information
- Full name: Christopher Leonidas Olsen
- Date of birth: 25 September 1981 (age 45)
- Place of birth: Colombia
- Height: 1.84 m (6 ft 1/2 in)
- Position: Midfielder

Senior career*
Years	Team	Apps	(Gls)
1996–2001	Harstad		
2002–2004	Tromsø		
2005–2007	Tromsdalen		
2008–2012	Hønefoss	95	(15)
2013–2015	Jevnaker		
2016–	Hønefoss	0	(0)
- * Club domestic league appearances and goals as of 8 October 2012

Christopher Leonidas Olsen (born 25 September 1981) is a Norwegian retired footballer.

He was born in Colombia, but was adopted to Harstad in Norway at the age of three. In 1996, he made his debut for Harstad. He was picked up by Tromsø in 2002 and played in the Norwegian Premier League. However, he had cruciate ligament injury problems. He played for Tromsdalen from 2005 to 2007 and joined Hønefoss in 2008.

He made his debut for Hønefoss on 13 April 2008 and played 53 matches to 1 January 2010 of which three were cup matches. Before the 2013 season he joined a small local team, Jevnaker.

After a lengthy spell in Jevnaker, he rejoined Hønefoss as playing coach for the reserve team. He also played two cup games for Hønefoss' A team.

== Career statistics ==
Season	Club	Division	League		Cup		Total	
Season	Club	Division	Apps	Goals	Apps	Goals	Apps	Goals
2008	Hønefoss	1. divisjon	21	4	0	0	21	4
2009	Hønefoss	1. divisjon	30	8	1	0	31	8
2010	Hønefoss	Tippeligaen	16	1	3	0	19	1
2011	Hønefoss	1. divisjon	26	2	3	0	29	2
2012	Hønefoss	Tippeligaen	2	0	3	0	5	0
Career Total			95	15	10	0	105	15
