= Christian Møllerop =

Christian Møllerop (b. 9 January 1981) is the leader of the Oslo and Akershus LLH, a Norwegian association for gay and lesbian rights. He was appointed in the spring of 2003.

Møllerop has been an active political figure for many years and is especially known for his international commissions, such as member of the board of Organising Bureau of European School Student Unions, where he established youth organisations in the Balkans. He was also the administrative leader for Akershus Teaterverksted and board member of Norske Teaterverksteder. At the present he is exclusively engaged with LLH and Skeive Dager, the Norwegian equivalent of the International Pride festival.
