= Tor Hermod Refsum =

Norwegian painter (1894–1981)

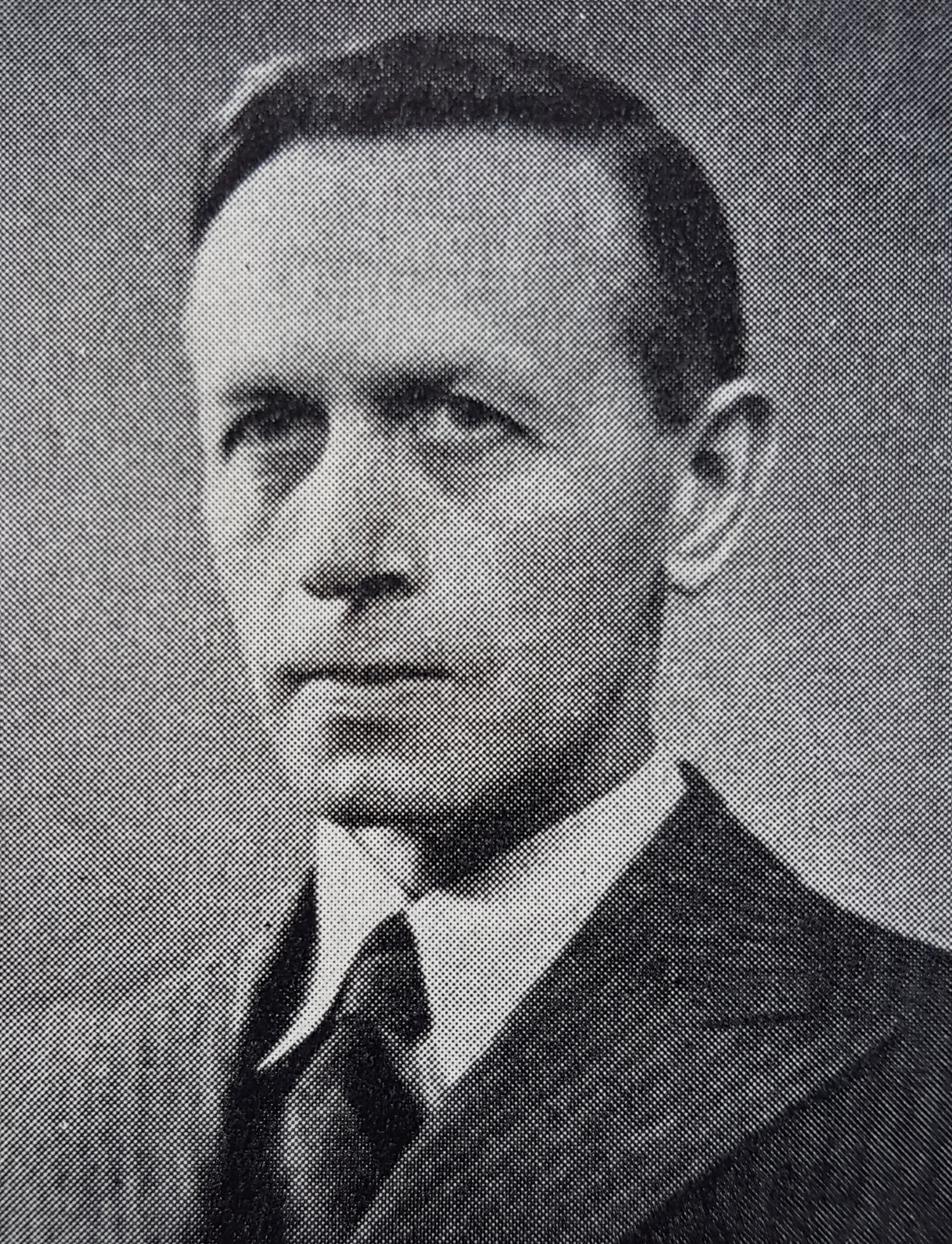
Tor Hermod Refsum

Tor Hermod Refsum (1894 – 1981) was a Norwegian painter.

He was born in Kristiania, and studied under Othon Friesz, André Lhote and Georg Jacobsen. He is represented with two landscapes in the National Gallery of Norway, which also owns some gouaches and aquarels. He was especially preoccupied with the landscape of the Gudbrandsdal valley.
