= Ida Hegazi Høyer =

Norwegian writer (born 1981)

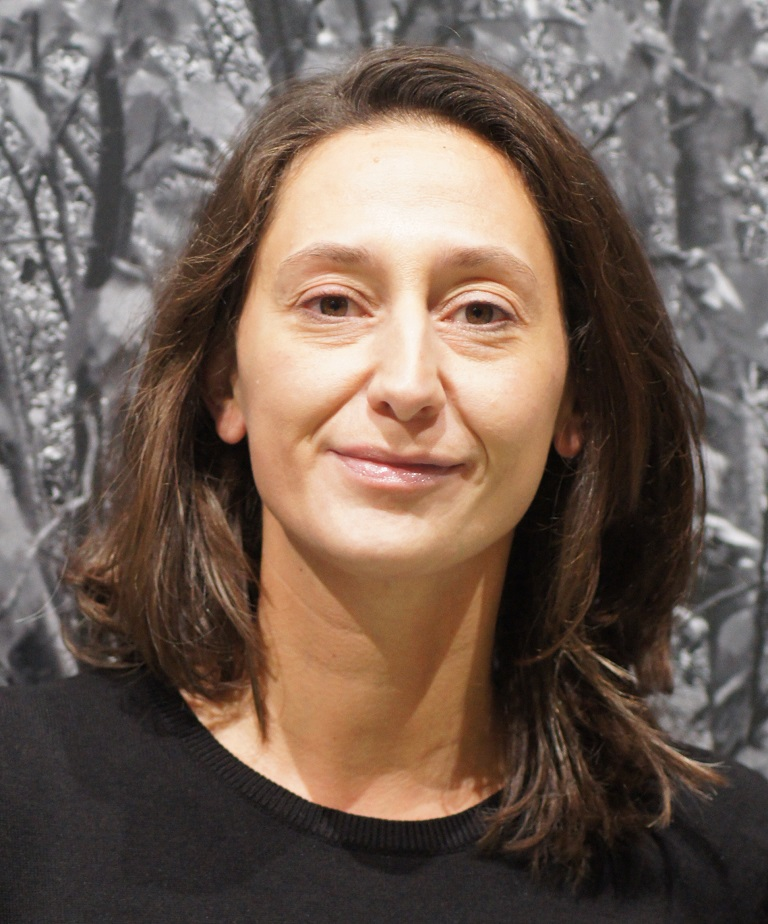
Ida Hegazi Høyer (2019)

Ida Hegazi Høyer (born 1981) is a Norwegian writer. Of dual Danish-Egyptian heritage, she grew up in Lofoten and Oslo. She has studied sociology in school. She currently lives in Oslomarka. She won the Bjørnson Stipend from the Norwegian Booksellers Association in 2014. In 2015, she won the EU Prize for Literature for Unnskyld.

== Novels ==
- Under Verden (2012)
- Ut (2013)
- Unnskyld (2014)
- Fortellingen om øde (2015)
- Historier om trøst (2016)
- Nordisk NU (2017)
- Fortællingen om øde (2017)
- Ene Skissen (2018)
- Kim Friele (2019)
- Ene: Barnet (2019)
