= Bjørn Arve Lund =

Norwegian footballer (born 1981)

Personal information
- Full name: Bjørn Arve Lund
- Date of birth: 19 January 1981 (age 45)
- Place of birth: Brønnøysund, Norway
- Height: 1.78 m (5 ft 10 in)
- Position: Midfielder

Youth career
- 1989–1998: Brønnøysund IL

Senior career*
Years	Team	Apps	(Gls)
1999	Brønnøysund IL	-	(-)
2000–2002	Bodø/Glimt	7	(0)
2003–2007	Levanger	57 +	(17)
2007–2008	→ Brønnøysund IL (loan)	-	(-)
2008–2009	Levanger	-	(-)
2010	Mo IL	-	(-)
2011–2012	Mosjøen IL	-	(-)

International career
2006	Norway U-16	-	(-)
- * Club domestic league appearances and goals as of 4 April 2008

Bjørn Arve Lund (born 19 January 1981) is a former footballer. He has played for F.K. Bodø/Glimt in the Norwegian Premier League. He started his career for Brønnøysund IL before moving to Bodø.

His spell in Bodø there was hampered with knee injuries. In 2003, he moved to second division club Levanger FK. One highlight includes the opening goal against the illustrious Rosenborg in a cup match (which Levanger ultimately lost).

Midway through the 2007 season, Lund moved back to his former club Brønnøysund IL on a short-term loan deal.

He has played for the Norwegian national team at U-16 level.
