= Birgit Dalland =

Norwegian politician (1907–2007)

Birgit Ellenora Johanne Dalland (5 February 1907 – 30 May 2007) was a Norwegian politician for the Communist Party.

She served as a deputy representative to the Norwegian Parliament from Bergen during the term 1945–1949.
