= Mari Hagen =

Norwegian politician (born 1981)

Mari Hagen (born 8 April 1981) is a Norwegian politician for the Socialist Left Party.

She served as a deputy representative to the Norwegian Parliament from Buskerud during the term 2001–2005. In total she met during 16 days of parliamentary session.
