= Linn Nyrønning =

Norwegian footballer (born 1981)

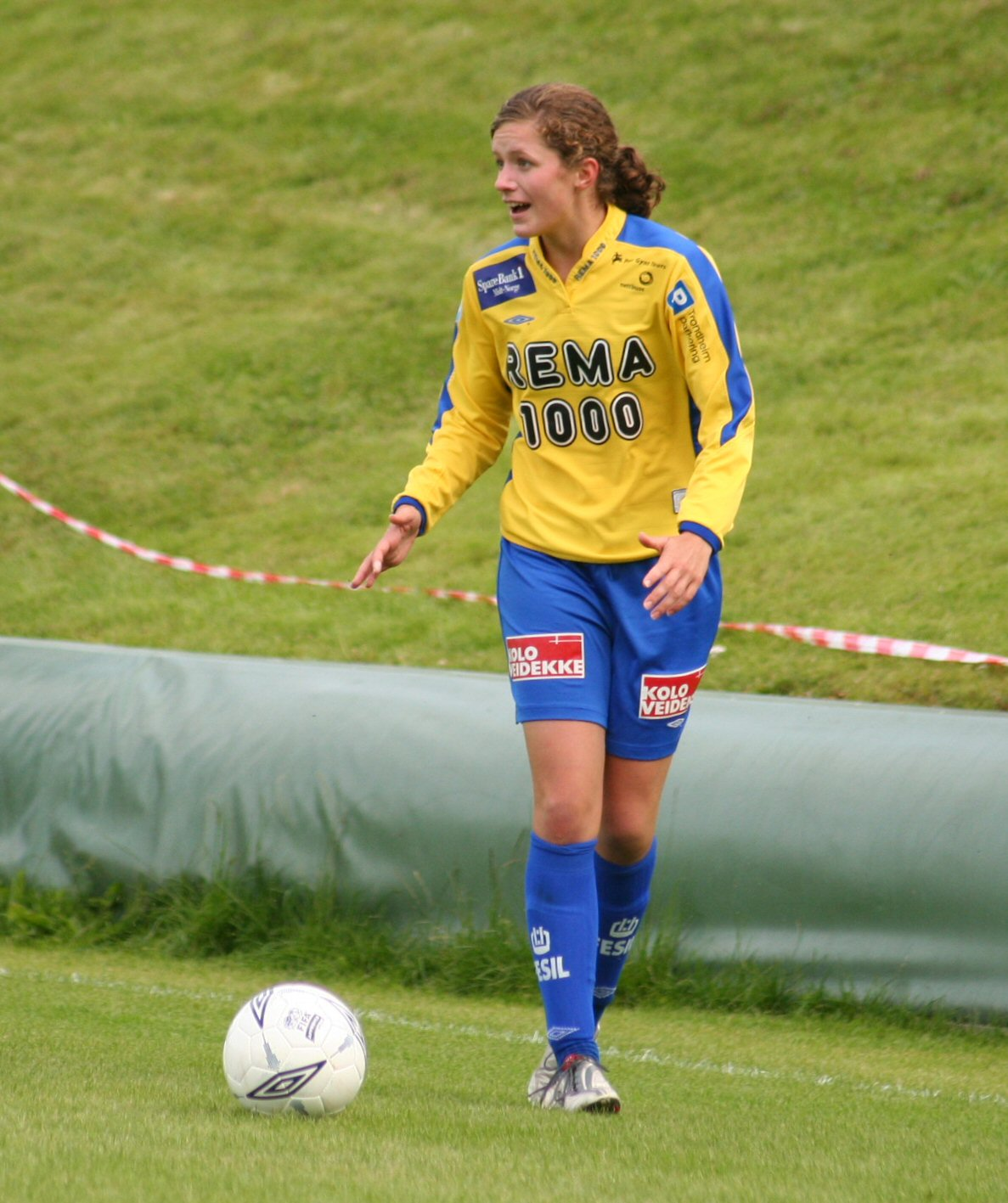

Personal information
- Full name: Linn Ålstedt Nyrønning
- Date of birth: 4 June 1981 (age 45)
- Position: Midfielder

Team information
- Current team: Trondheims-Ørn
- Number: 9

Youth career
- Flatås IL

Senior career*
Years	Team	Apps	(Gls)
1997–	Trondheims-Ørn		

International career^{‡}
2005	Norway	3	(0)
- * Club domestic league appearances and goals ‡ National team caps and goals as of 19 December 2007

Linn Nyrønning (born 4 June 1981) is a Norwegian football midfielder who currently plays for Trondheims-Ørn.
