= Oskar Slaaen =

Norwegian politician

Oskar Slaaen (13 September 1907 – 3 March 1972) was a Norwegian politician for the Liberal Party.

He served as a deputy representative to the Norwegian Parliament from Telemark during the term 1965–1969.
