= Olaf Sunde =

Norwegian lawyer and workers' rights activist (1915–1981)

Olaf Sunde (14 May 1915 – 26 October 1981) was a Norwegian lawyer and workers' rights activist.

== Early life ==
Sunde was born in Bergen in 1915. His family moved from Holsnøy to Oslo in 1930. During World War II, Sunde was a leader of a local group of Milorg, the Norwegian armed resistance against the Nazi occupation. Sunde was present at Akershus Fortress in Oslo on May 8, 1945, when Germany capitulated and formally handed the fortress over to Milorg. The Norwegian flag was raised for the first time since 1940, and Norway was a free and sovereign nation again.

== Norwegian Confederation of Trade Unions ==
After the war, Sunde worked as a lawyer for the Norwegian Confederation of Trade Unions (LO), where he headed their legal department. He represented workers and opposed employers in many groundbreaking court cases. The author Jostein Nyhamar writes, "No other labour movement issue caused so much prolonged and heated debate in the press as the issue of collective insurance," an issue with which Sunde was heavily involved.

Sunde was admitted to the bar at the Supreme Court of Norway. There, he was in contact with Johan Bernhard Hjort, a one-time founder (with Vidkun Quisling) of Nasjonal Samling, which fronted the puppet government under the Nazi occupation. Although Hjort had left Nasjonal Samling, the tension between him and Sunde remained evident.

== ILO years ==
Sunde was later Norwegian legal counsel at the International Labour Organization (ILO), a United Nations subsidiary based in Geneva. He was the workers' representative on the ILC Credentials Committee for six sessions.

An interpreter to the Norwegian delegation to the ILO International Labour Conference, Mirjam Nordahl, states that Sunde was part of the Norwegian delegation to this lawmaking body in the 1960s and 1970s and that he was later employed by the International Labour Office, the permanent executive branch of the ILO.

== Later life ==
Sunde was a partner with his brother in the Sunde law firm until he died in 1981.
