= Olav Torpp =

Norwegian traffic engineer and civil servant

Olav A. B. Torpp (1907–1993) was a Norwegian traffic engineer and civil servant.

He graduated as siv.ing. from the Norwegian Institute of Technology in 1931, and then spent his entire career in the Norwegian Public Roads Administration. He was county director of roads in Hordaland from 1951, and in 1961 he was hired as head of the road department in the Norwegian Directorate of Public Roads. He applied for the position of director of the Directorate of Public Roads in 1962, and was seen as a strong candidate, but Karl Olsen was appointed. Instead, Torpp worked as assisting director and head of the technical department. He retired in 1977.
