= Kristoffer Paulsen Vatshaug =

Norwegian footballer (born 1981)

Personal information
- Date of birth: 3 June 1981 (age 45)
- Place of birth: Levanger Municipality, Norway
- Position: Defender

Senior career*
Years	Team	Apps	(Gls)
2000–2005	Bodø/Glimt	96	(1)
2006–2007	Start	39	(2)
2008–2013	Molde	130	(1)

International career^{‡}
2002–2003	Norway U21	8	(0)
- * Club domestic league appearances and goals as of 13 November 2013 ‡ National team caps and goals as of 6 April 2009

Kristoffer Paulsen Vatshaug (born Kristoffer Paulsen, 3 June 1981) is a retired Norwegian footballer. He played for IL Sverre, Steinkjer FK, Levanger FK, FK Bodø/Glimt, IK Start and Molde FK.

He retired after the 2013 season, and was hired as a developer in the Football Association of Norway.

== Career statistics ==
As of 13 November 2013

Club	Season	Division	League		Cup		Total	
Club	Season	Division	Apps	Goals	Apps	Goals	Apps	Goals
2000	Bodø/Glimt	Tippeligaen	2	0	0	0	2	0
2001	Bodø/Glimt	Tippeligaen	5	0	3	0	8	0
2002	Bodø/Glimt	Tippeligaen	19	0	3	0	22	0
2003	Bodø/Glimt	Tippeligaen	24	0	7	0	31	0
2004	Bodø/Glimt	Tippeligaen	23	0	3	0	26	0
2005	Bodø/Glimt	Tippeligaen	23	1	1	0	24	1
Bodø/Glimt Total			96	1	17	0	113	1
2006	Start	Tippeligaen	14	1	4	0	18	1
2007	Start	Tippeligaen	25	1	4	0	29	1
Start Total			39	2	8	0	47	2
2008	Molde	Tippeligaen	26	0	6	1	32	1
2009	Molde	Tippeligaen	26	0	5	0	31	0
2010	Molde	Tippeligaen	24	0	2	0	26	0
2011	Molde	Tippeligaen	26	0	3	0	29	0
2012	Molde	Tippeligaen	19	0	4	0	23	0
2013	Molde	Tippeligaen	9	1	0	0	9	1
Molde Total			130	1	20	1	150	2
Career Total			265	4	44	1	309	5

Source: nifs.no

== Honours ==
Molde

- Tippeligaen (2): 2011, 2012
- Norwegian Football Cup (1): 2013
