= Andreas Honerød =

Norwegian politician

Andreas Honerød (born 29 June 1905 – 13 October 1965) was a Norwegian politician for the Labour Party.

He served as a deputy representative to the Norwegian Parliament from Vestfold during the terms 1961–1965 and 1965–1969.
