= Ola Høyland =

Norwegian politician

- Born: 25 May 1890; Stord Municipality, Norway
- Died: 18 May 1981 (aged 90)
- Occupation: Politician

Ola Høyland (25 May 1890 – 18 May 1981) was a Norwegian politician.

He was born in Stord Municipality to Ola Høyland and Brita Hovdeland. He was elected representative to the Storting for the period 1954–1957 for the Farmers' Party.
