= Kåre Norum =

Norwegian educator and resistance member

Kåre Norum (14 November 1907 – 2 August 1981) was a Norwegian educator and resistance member.

== Life ==
He was born in Nesodden, Norway.

Norum was editor of the magazine Norsk Skuleblad from 1934 to 1941. During the occupation of Norway by Nazi Germany he represented the teachers in the civil resistance movement's Coordination Committee. In 1946 he was elected chairman of the union Norsk Lærerlag, and he later had various positions for the organization. He was decorated Knight, First Class of the Order of St. Olav in 1972.
