= Patrick Holtet =

Norwegian footballer (born 1981)

Personal information
- Full name: Patrick Andreas Holtet
- Date of birth: 2 April 1981 (age 45)
- Place of birth: Oslo, Norway
- Positions: Midfielder; forward

Youth career
- Flisa

Senior career*
Years	Team	Apps	(Gls)
- Flisa
- Elverum
- Kongsvinger
	Viking	1	(0)
- Skeid
- Kongsvinger
- * Club domestic league appearances and goals

Patrick Holtet (born 2 April 1981) is a retired Norwegian footballer that currently works for Kongsvinger in the Norwegian First Division.

He was earlier in Viking and were capped in one game in the Norwegian Premier League against Skeid. He later transferred to Skeid. After playing over 150 games for Kongsvinger he retired as a player in 2009, but stayed in the club to work as a coach.
