= Birger Haug =

Norwegian high jumper (1908–1981)

Birger Haug (19 August 1908 – 16 January 1981) was a Norwegian high jumper. He represented Verdal IL.

At the 1932 Summer Olympics he finished ninth in the high jump final with a jump of 1.85 metres. He won silver medals at the Norwegian championships in 1930, 1931 and 1933.

His personal best jump was 1.915 metres, achieved in August 1931 on Bislett stadion.

After he ended the career, he worked as a physical education teacher.
