= Arne Skaare =

Norwegian politician

Arne Odd Skaare (16 January 1907 - 11 August 1981) was a Norwegian politician for the Conservative Party.

He served as a deputy representative to the Norwegian Parliament from Akershus during the term 1954–1957.

On the local level, Skaare was mayor of Asker municipality from 1956 to 1967.
