= Haakon Hansen (politician) =

Norwegian politician

Haakon Aksel Kristian Jølle Hansen (5 May 1907 – 24 May 1971) was a Norwegian politician for the Liberal Party.

He served as a deputy representative to the Norwegian Parliament from Vest-Agder during the term 1965–1969.
