= Karl Valdemar Westerlund =

Norwegian politician

Karl Valdemar Westerlund (24 February 1907 – 23 November 1997) was a Norwegian politician for the Labour Party.

He served as a deputy representative to the Norwegian Parliament from Hedmark during the term 1965–1969.
