= Asbjørn Listerud =

Norwegian politician

Asbjørn Listerud (6 January 1905 – 7 June 1981) was a Norwegian politician for the Liberal Party.

He was born in Vestre Toten Municipality.

He served as a deputy representative to the Norwegian Parliament from Østfold during the term 1961–1965 and 1965–1969.

Listerud was a member of the municipal council of Våler Municipality from 1937 to 1975, serving as mayor from 1955 to 1963. From 1955 to 1967 he was also a member of Østfold county council.
