= Aanund Bjørnsson Berdal =

Norwegian engineer

- Born: 4 April 1888; Vinje Municipality, Norway
- Died: 4 April 1981 (aged 93)
- Occupation: engineer

Aanund Bjørnsson Berdal (4 April 1888 – 4 April 1981) was a Norwegian engineer.

Berdal was born in Vinje Municipality as a son of farmers Bjørn Aslaksson Berdal (1845–1915) and Margit Aanundsdatter Jore (1859–1938). In September 1918 he married Kristine (Motta) Moxness (1898–1985). Their daughter, Margit, married officer Jens Christian Magnus. He died in April 1981 in Bærum Municipality.

He was a pioneer in the development of hydroelectric power stations in Norway. He was decorated Knight, First Class of the Order of St. Olav in 1961, and was a Grand Knight of the Icelandic Order of the Falcon.
