= 1999 in Norway =

- Centuries: 18th; 19th; 20th; 21st
- Decades: 1970s; 1980s; 1990s; 2000s; 2010s
- See also: List of years in Norway

Events in the year 1999 in Norway.

== Incumbents ==
- Monarch – Harald V.
- Prime Minister – Kjell Magne Bondevik (Christian Democratic Party)

== Events ==
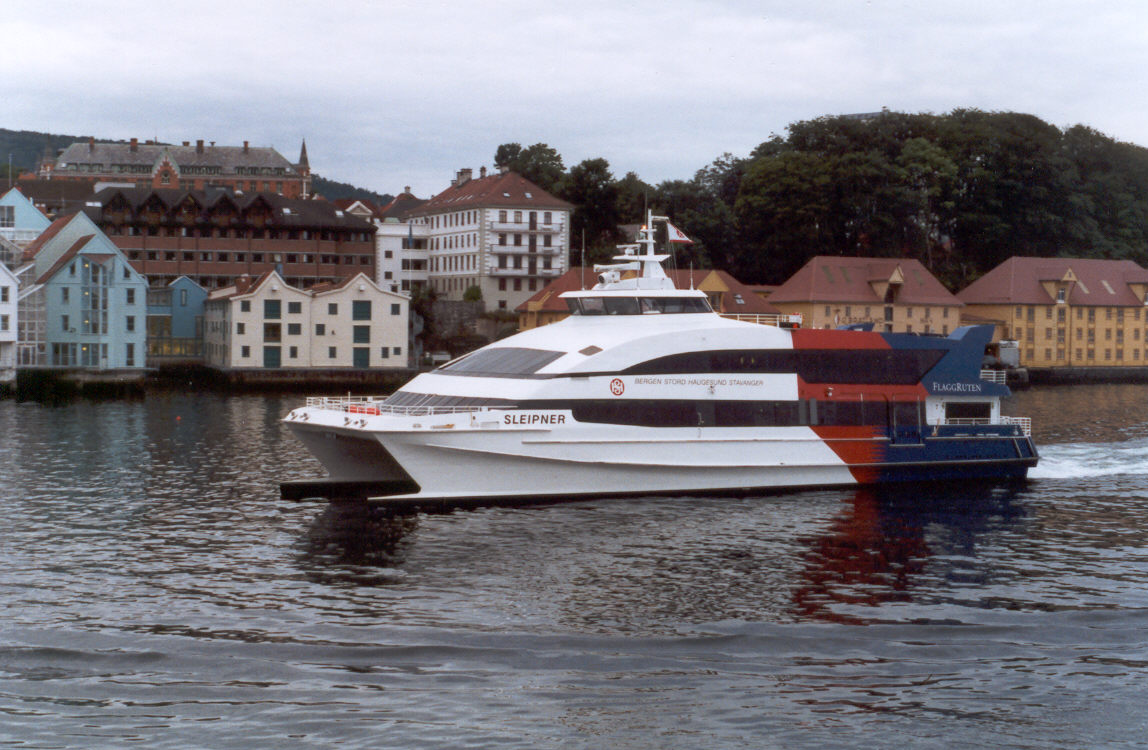
The MS Sleipner disaster

- 1 February – The Coastal Party (Norwegian: Kystpartiet) is founded.
- 23 April – Arve Beheim Karlsen drowns in Sogndalselva
- 30 September – Metropol TV starts broadcasting.
- 26 November – The boat MS Sleipner collided with a rock in the notorious part of the North Sea called "Sletta", just north of the town of Haugesund. The ship sank and 16 of the people on board died.
- Saga Petroleum, Norway's third largest petroleum company, is acquired by Norsk Hydro.
- Municipal and county elections are held throughout the country.

== Popular culture ==
=== Music ===
- Norway in the Eurovision Song Contest 1999

== Notable births ==
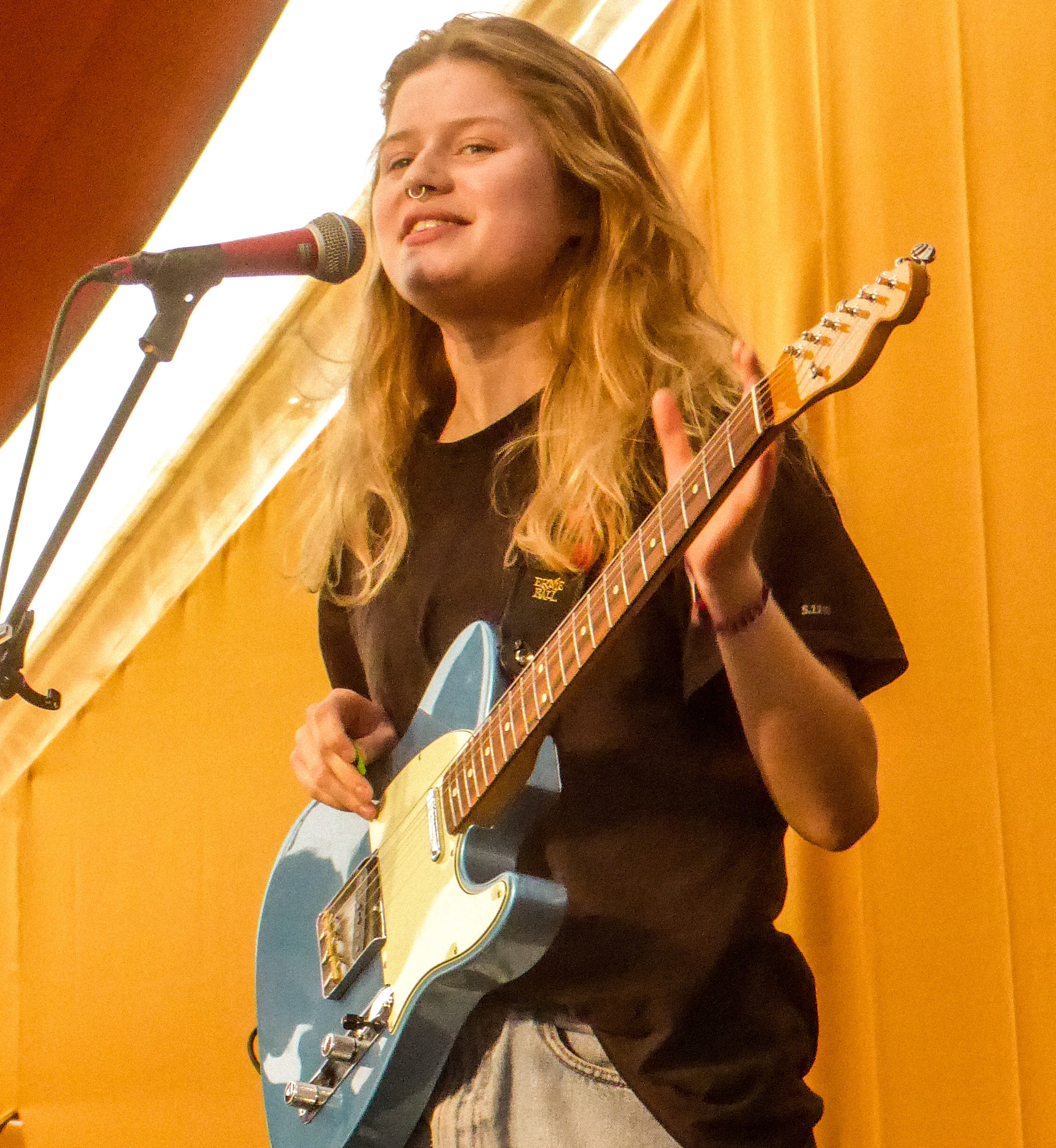
Girl in Red

- 11 January – Jeanette Hegg Duestad, sport shooter.
- 8 February – Kristine Stavås Skistad, cross-country skier.
- 9 February – Henny Reistad, handball player.
- 16 February – Girl in Red (Marie Ulven), singer-songwriter.
- 28 April – Silje Opseth, ski jumper.
- 4 June – Aryan Tari, chess player.
- 16 July – Frida Maanum, footballer.
- 23 August – Jesper Saltvik Pedersen, para-alpine skier.
- 24 December – Maksim Guttormsen Råskhof, politician.

== Notable deaths ==
=== January ===
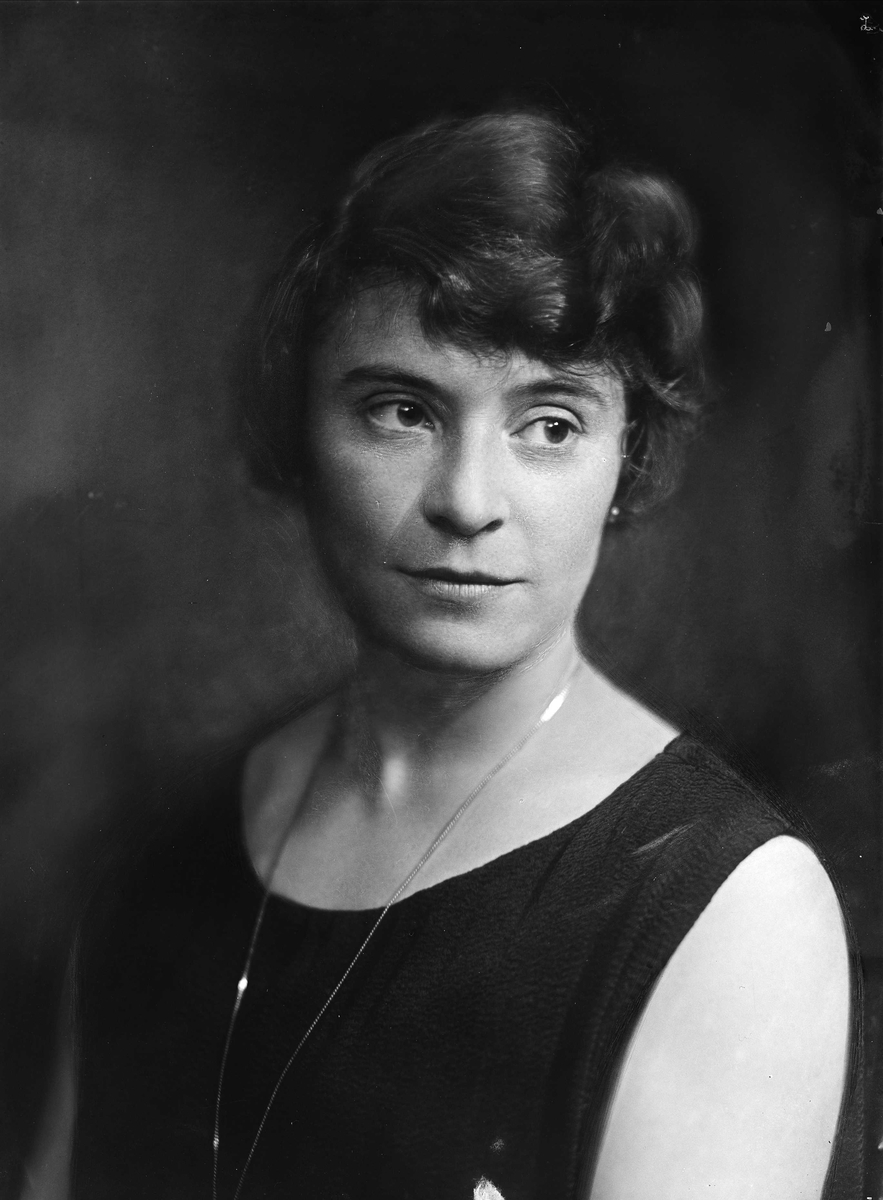
Gerda Ring

- 2 January – Aase Lionæs, politician (b.1907).
- 4 January – Fredrik Mellbye, physician and chief medical officer (born 1917).
- 12 January – Gerda Ring, actress (born 1891).
- 19 January – Odd Vigestad, politician (b.1915).
- 21 January – Magne Lystad, orienteering champion (b.1932).

=== February ===
- 1 February – Martin Skaaren, politician (b.1905).
- 8 February – Øistein Parmann, journalist and publisher (born 1921).
- 9 February – Bernhard Paus, orthopedic surgeon and Grand Master of the Norwegian Order of Freemasons (b.1910)
- 10 February – Birger Leirud, high jumper (b.1924)
- 13 February – Kåre Hovda, biathlete (b.1944).
- 26 February – Bjørn Wiik, physicist (b.1937)

=== March ===
Else Granheim

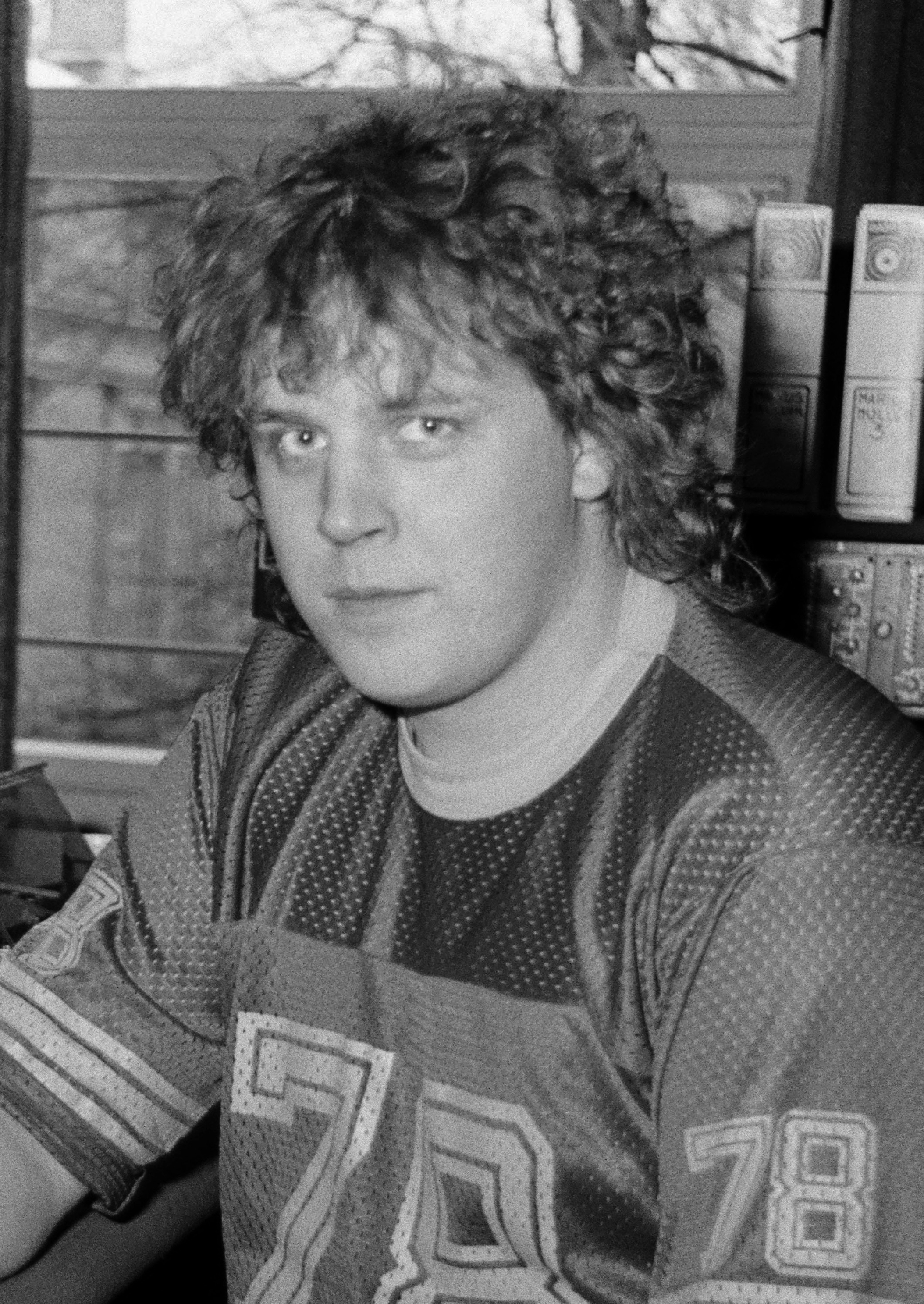
Marius Müller

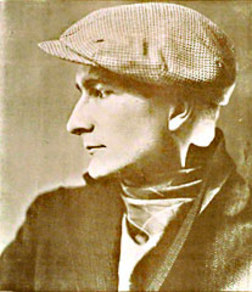
Jens Book-Jenssen

- 7 March
  - Else Granheim, librarian and civil servant (born 1926).
  - Olav Hagesæther, bishop (born 1909).
- 14 March
  - Frithjof Jacobsen, diplomat (born 1914).
  - Marius Müller, rock musician (born 1958).
- 16 March –
  - Trygve Bull, politician (born 1905).
  - Åsta Holth, writer (born 1904).
- 17 March – Elling Øvergård, sport shooter (born 1947).
- 20 March – Grete Nash, ceramist (born 1939).
- 24 March – Odd Sannes, sport shooter (born 1922).
- 26 March
  - Olle Johan Eriksen, politician (b.1923).
  - Nils O. Golten, politician (born 1936).
  - Eva Kolstad, politician and Minister (b.1918).
- 27 March – Oskar Øksnes, politician (born 1921).
- 28 March – Jens Book-Jenssen, popular singer, songwriter, revue artist, and theatre director (b.1910).
- 29 March – Helmer Dahl, electrical engineer (born 1908).
- 31 March – Curt James Haydn, bobsledder (born 1919).

=== April ===
- 9 April – Ingolv Helland, politician (born 1906).
- 13 April – Knut Hauge, writer (born 1911).
- 14 April – Tor Bjerkmann, publisher (b. 1939).
- 16 April – Osmund Faremo, politician (born 1921).
- 27 April – Gunnar Brunvoll, impresario and opera administrator (b. 1924).

=== May ===
- 4 May – Henry Tiller, boxer (born 1914).
- 7 May – Randi Anda, politician (b.1898).
- 9 May – Albert Henrik Mohn, journalist (born 1918).
- 25 May – Lydolf Lind Meløy, politician (born 1908).
- 31 May – Carl Viggo Manthey Lange, politician (b.1904).

=== June ===
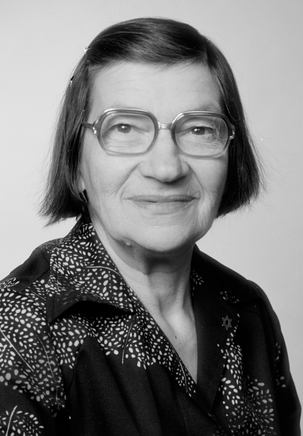
Eva Scheer

- 5 June – Magne Kleiven, gymnast (born 1921).
- 10 June – Ingrid Øvre Wiik, actress (born 1918).
- 12 June – Ola Bauer, novelist and playwright (born 1943).
- 16 June – Thor Lund, politician (b.1921).
- 19 June – Karl J. Brommeland, politician (b.1913).
- 22 June
  - Petter Furberg, politician (b.1923).
  - Eva Scheer, journalist, literary critic, translator and author (b. 1915).
- 25 June – Borghild Rud, illustrator (born 1910).

=== July ===
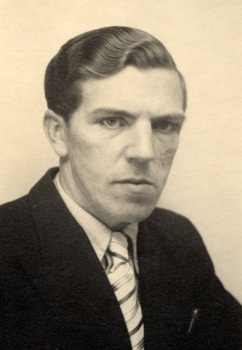
Trygve Haavelmo

- 4 July – Georg Johansen, gymnast (born 1924).
- 12 July – Trond Øyen, violinist (born 1929).
- 20 July – Kirsten Ohm, diplomat (born 1930).
- 21 July – Arne Sletsjøe, violist (born 1916).
- 23 July – Yngvar Barda, chess player (born 1935).
- 26 July – Trygve Haavelmo, economist, awarded the Nobel Memorial Prize in Economic Sciences (b.1911)

=== August ===
- 12 August – Olav Hummelvold, politician (born 1903).
- 25 August – Jan Iversen, politician (b.1916).

=== September ===
- 7 September – Bjarne Iversen, cross country skier and Olympic silver medallist (b.1912).
- 13 September
  - Erik Diesen, revue writer and radio and television personality (born 1922).
  - Ragnar Rygel, ice hockey player (born 1930).
- 19 September – Kjell Kristiansen, footballer (born 1925).

=== October ===
- 1 October – Thore Boye, diplomat (born 1912).
- 5 October – Lars Breie, jurist, auditor and politician (b.1907).
- 6 October – Randi Kolstad, actress (born 1925).
- 9 October – Per Håland, newspaper editor (born 1919).
- 20 October – Asbjørn Skarstein, diplomat (born 1922).
- 24 October – Nicolai Johansen, sports official (born 1917).

=== November ===
- 9 November – Hersleb Vogt, diplomat (born 1912).
- 24 November – Per Hohle, writer (born 1918).
- 25 November – Oddvar Berrefjord, jurist, politician and Minister (b.1918).

=== December ===
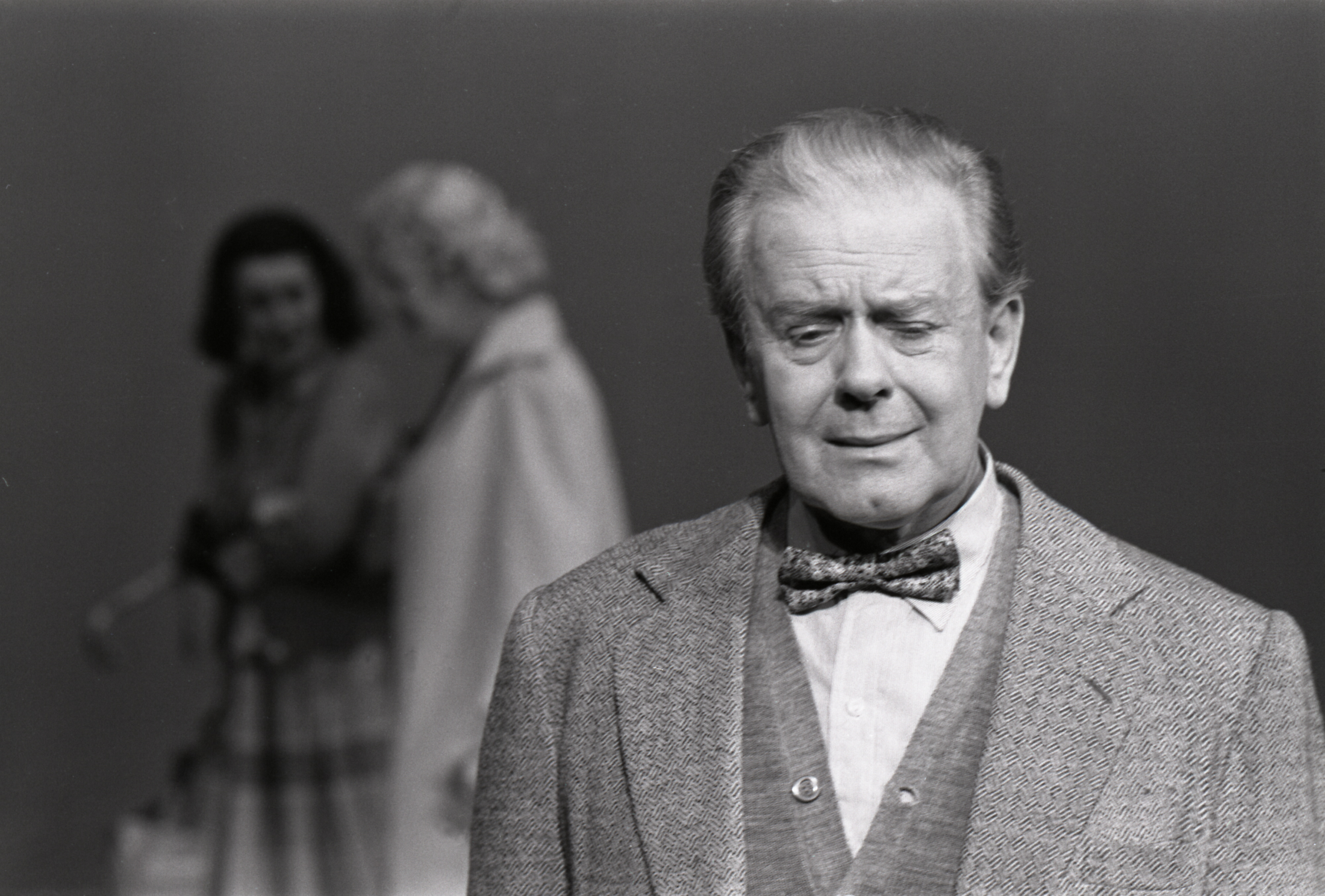
Per Aabel

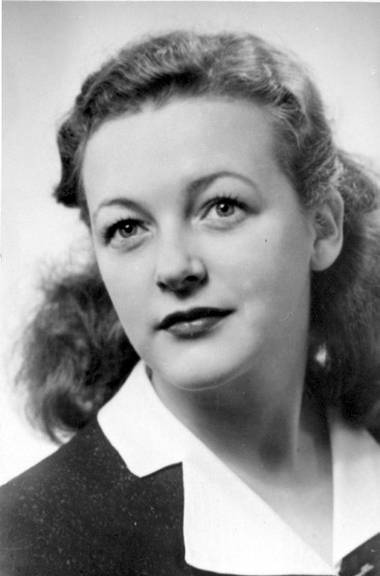
Dagmar Lahlum

- 8 December
  - Bjarne Flem, politician (b.1914).
  - Kjell Moe, international footballer (b.1909)
- 11 December – Oddleif Fagerheim, politician (b.1911).
- 21 December – Elsa Rastad Bråten, politician (b.1918).
- 22 December – Per Aabel, comic actor (b.1902).
- 23 December – Valter Gabrielsen, politician (b.1921).
- 25 December – Arne Ileby, footballer (born 1913).
- 26 December
  - Wilhelm Aarek, philologist and educationalist (born 1907).
  - Ola Skjåk Bræk, banker, politician and Minister (b.1912).
- 28 December – Dagmar Lahlum, resistance member and agent (born 1923).
- 30 December – Kjølv Egeland, politician (b.1918).
- 31 December
  - Ferdinand Finne, artist (b.1910).
  - Johannes Seland, politician (b.1912).

=== Full date unknown ===
- Erling Anger, civil servant (b.1909)
- Karl Olsen, civil servant (b.1910)
- Hans Skjervheim, philosopher (b.1926)
