= 1920 in Norway =

- Centuries: 18th; 19th; 20th; 21st
- Decades: 1900s; 1910s; 1920s; 1930s; 1940s
- See also: List of years in Norway

Events in the year 1920 in Norway.

== Incumbents ==
- Monarch – Haakon VII.

== Events ==
- 9 February – The League of Nations gives the islands of Spitsbergen to Norway.
- 17–19 June – The Centre Party was founded.
- The Aalesund ship is discovered embedded in the earth south of Ålesund.

== Popular culture ==
=== Sports ===
- Helge Løvland, won the Olympic gold medal in the decathlon.

=== Literature ===
- Knut Hamsund was awarded the Nobel Prize in Literature for the novel Markens Grøde (Growth of the Soil, 1917).
- The Knut Hamsund novel Konerne ved Vandposten Volume 1 & 2 (The Women at the Pump), was published.
- The third Sigrid Undset for the trilogy of Kristin Lavransdatter was published.
- The Olav Duun novel Storbybryllope (The Big Wedding) from the work Juvikfolket (The People of Juvik, 1918–23), was published.

== Notable births ==
=== January ===
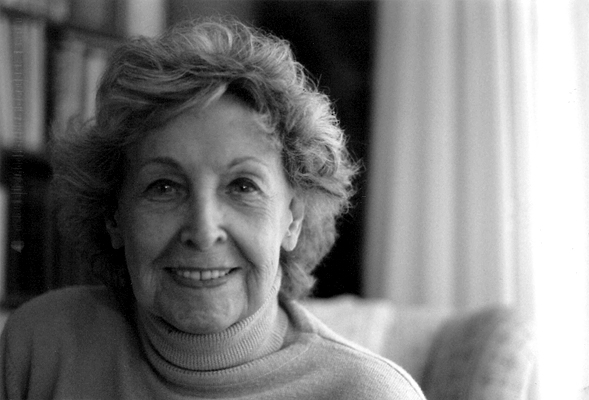
Rut Brandt

- 2 January – Anne-Sofie Østvedt, resistance leader (died 2009)
- 3 January – Grethe Rytter Hasle, planktologist (died 2013)
- 7 January – Anders Bratholm, jurist and professor of jurisprudence (died 2010)
- 10 January – Rut Brandt, writer and second wife of the German Chancellor Willy Brandt (died 2006)
- 11 January – Ole Henrik Moe, pianist, art historian and art critic (died 2013).
- 14 January – Helge Rognlien, politician and Minister (died 2001)
- 19 January – Kåre Olafsen, resistance member, executed (died 1945)
- 20 January – Thorleif Schjelderup, ski jumper, Olympic bronze medallist and author (died 2006)
- 27 January – Gudmund Saxrud, civil servant and diplomat (died 2003)

=== February ===
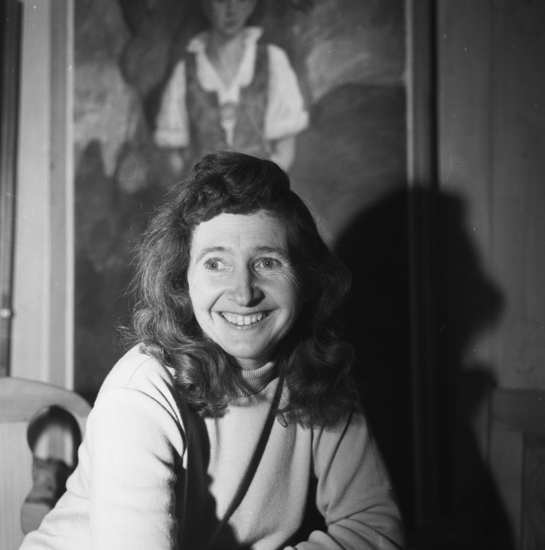
Anne-Cath. Vestly

- 4 February – Ole J. Kleppa, physical chemist (died 2007)
- 8 February – Sverre Farstad, speed skater and Olympic gold medallist (died 1978)
- 15 February – Anne-Catharina Vestly, children's author (died 2008)
- 16 February – Karsten Andersen, conductor (died 1997).
- 17 February – Ivo Caprino, film director and writer (died 2001)
- 21 February – Per Øisang, journalist and radio and television presenter (died 1967)

=== March ===
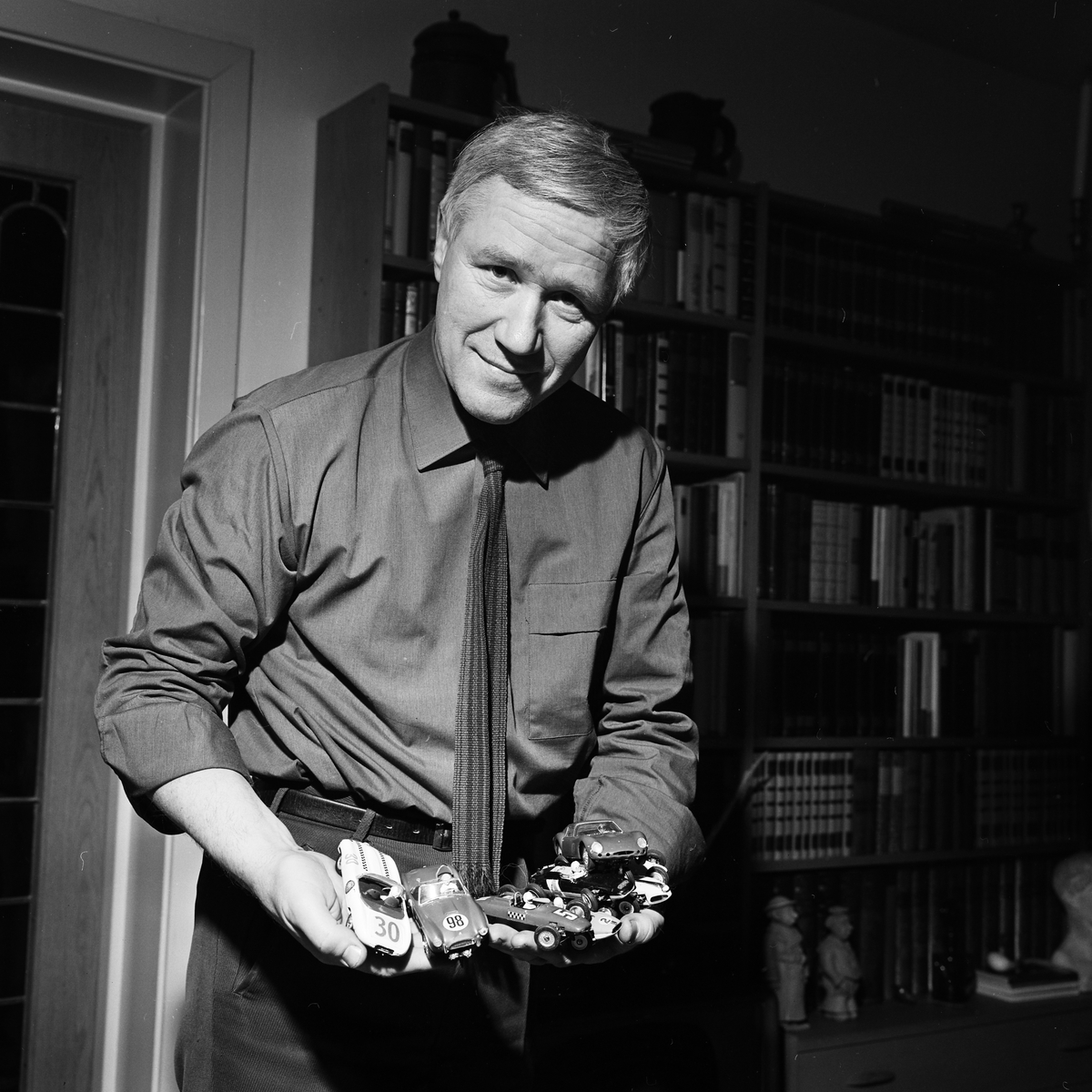
Kjell Aukrust

- 3 March – Henry Gundersen, resistance member, executed (died 1945)
- 10 March – Finn Ferner, sailor and Olympic silver medallist (died 2001).
- 11 March – Kåre Kristiansen, politician (died 2005)
- 19 March – Kjell Aukrust, author, poet and artist (died 2002)
- 21 March – Trygve Moe, politician (died 1998)
- 23 March – Lorentz Eldjarn, biochemist and medical doctor (died 2007)
- 27 March – Maren-Sofie Røstvig, literary historian (died 2014).
- 29 March – Hans Methlie Michelsen, judge (died 2014)

=== April ===
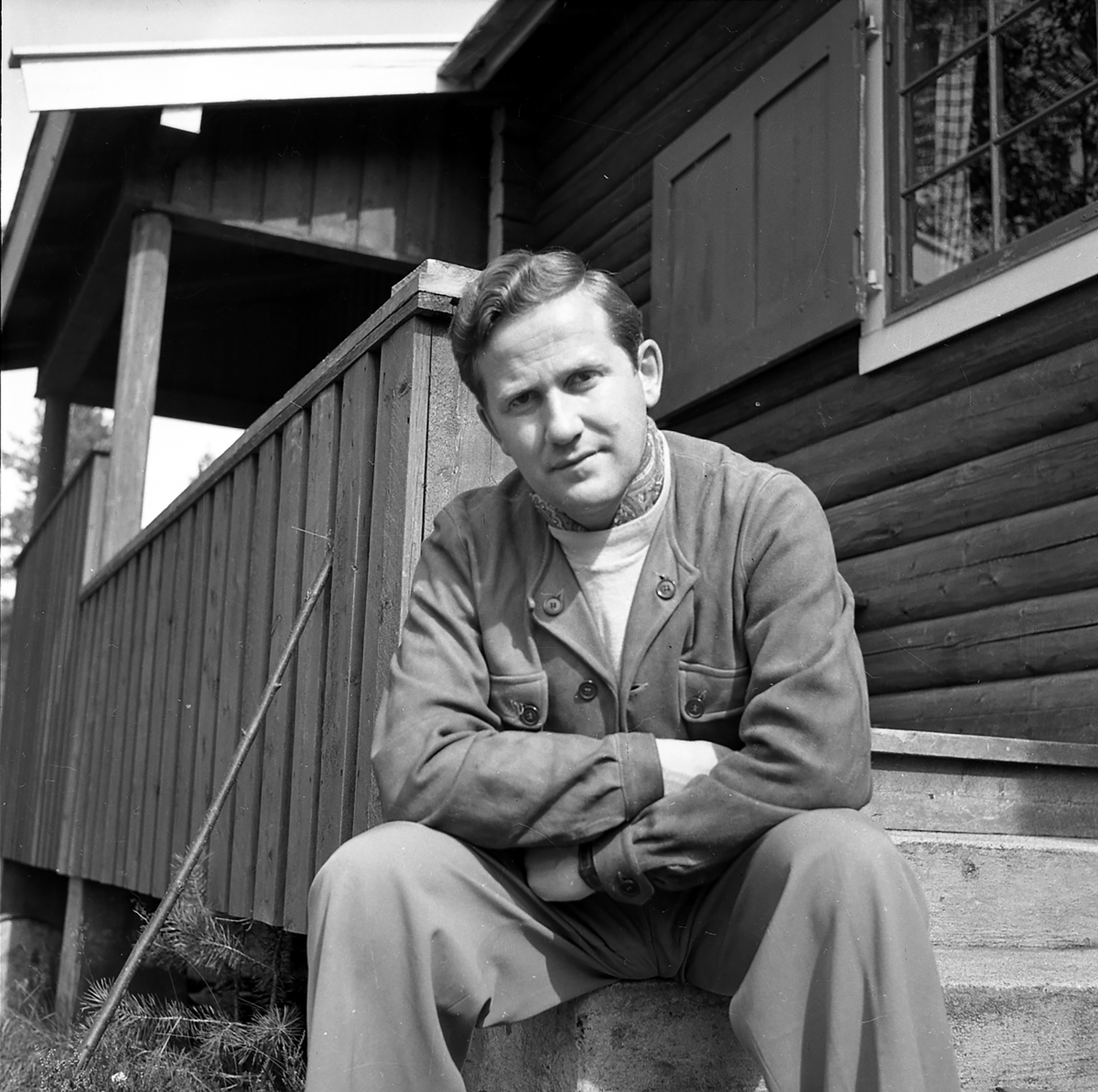
Dagfinn Grønoset

- 4 April – Dagfinn Grønoset, author (died 2008)
- 8 April – Kristian Asdahl, politician (died 2000)
- 9 April – Otto Nes, television manager (died 2014)
- 10 April – Jakob Aano, politician (died 2016)
- 12 April – Audun Hetland, illustrator (died 1998)
- 19 April – Ragnar Ulstein, journalist, writer and resistance member (died 2019).
- 22 April – Adolf Bogstad, resistance member, executed (died 1945)
- 28 April – Egil Endresen, jurist and politician (died 1992)

=== May ===
- 7 May – Einar Wøhni, politician (died 1987)
- 10 May – Olaf Kortner, politician (died 1998)
- 11 May − Per Jorsett, sports reporter (died 2019)
- 29 May – Bjarne Aagard Strøm, politician (died 2008)

=== June ===
- 1 June – Alexander Pihl, medical scientist (died 2009).
- 6 June – Tormod Førland, chemist (died 1995).
- 14 June – Ivar Mathisen, sprint canoer and Olympic silver medallist (died 2008)
- 29 June – Tom Blohm, footballer (died 2000).
- 30 June – Hans Kristian Seip, forester (died 2012)

=== July ===
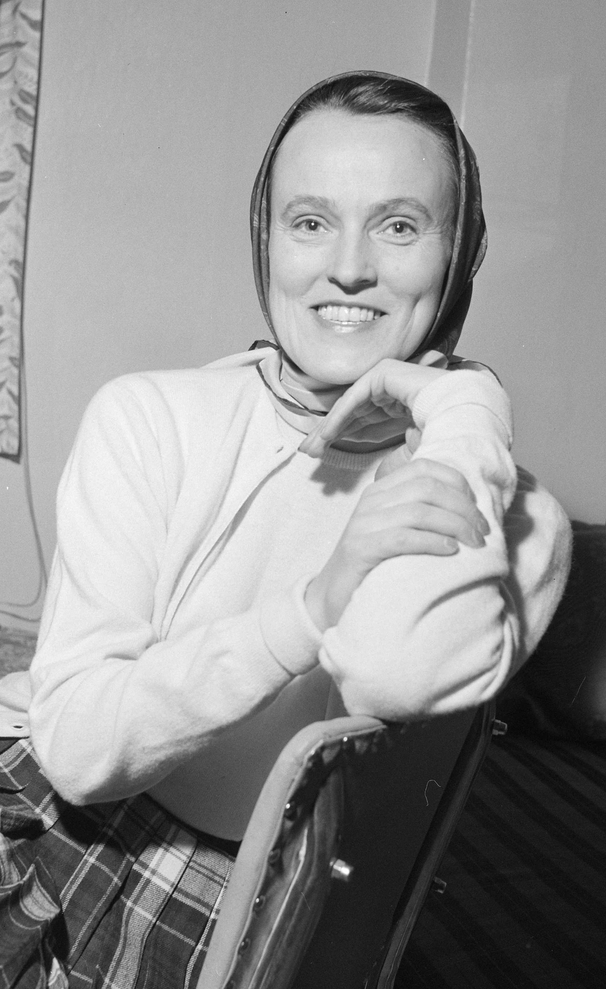
Merete Skavlan

- 2 July – Lars T. Platou, electrical engineer and politician (died 2003)
- 6 July – Carl Nesjar, painter, sculptor and printmaker (died 2015).
- 9 July – Ragnhild Magerøy, novelist and essayist (died 2010).
- 13 July – Jens Christian Magnus, military officer and politician (died 2017)
- 15 July – Gudmund Grytøyr, politician (died 2001)
- 21 July – Gunnar Thoresen, international soccer player (died 2017)
- 21 July – Harald Warholm, politician (died 1967)
- 22 July – Ingvar Bakken, politician (died 1982)
- 25 July – Merete Skavlan, actress, theatre instructor and director (died 2018)
- 27 July – Olaf Poulsen, speed skater and president of the International Skating Union (died 2008)
- 31 July – Per Hysing-Dahl, politician (died 1989)

=== August ===
- 3 August – Jonas Brunvoll Jr., opera singer and actor (died 1982).
- 9 August
  - Kjeld Langeland, politician (died 1973)
  - Tormod Skagestad, writer, actor and theatre director (died 1997).

=== September ===
- 6 September – Sigurd Helle, topographer and explorer (died 2013).
- 20 September – Rolf Kirkvaag, journalist and radio and television personality (died 2003)

=== October ===
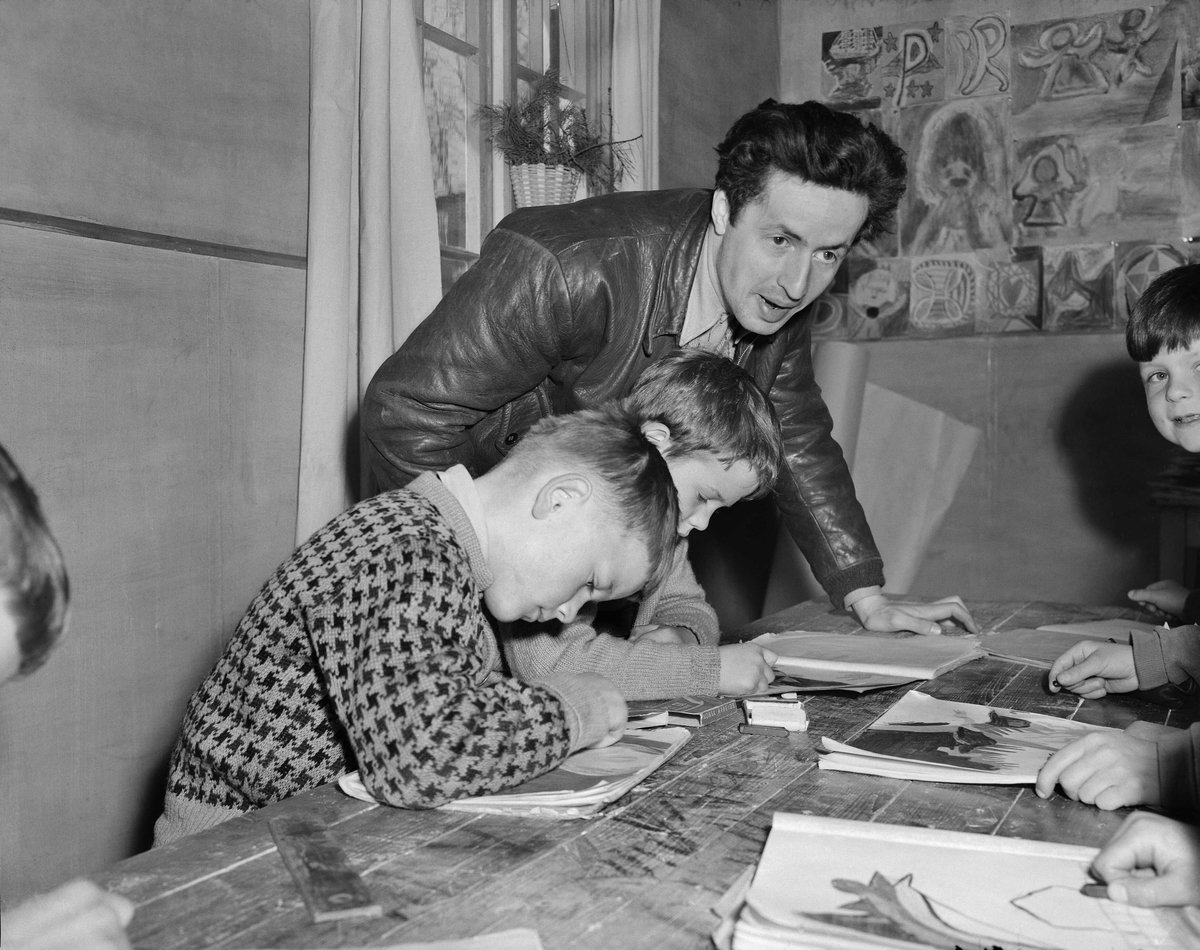
Jens Bjørneboe

- 6 October – Edvard Beyer, literary historian, literary critic and professor (died 2003)
- 9 October
  - Jens Bjørneboe, writer (died 1976)
  - Jens Boyesen, diplomat and politician (died 1996)
- 24 October – Per Saugstad, psychologist and professor (died 2010)
- 26 October – Anne Valen Hestetun, politician (died 2009)

=== November ===
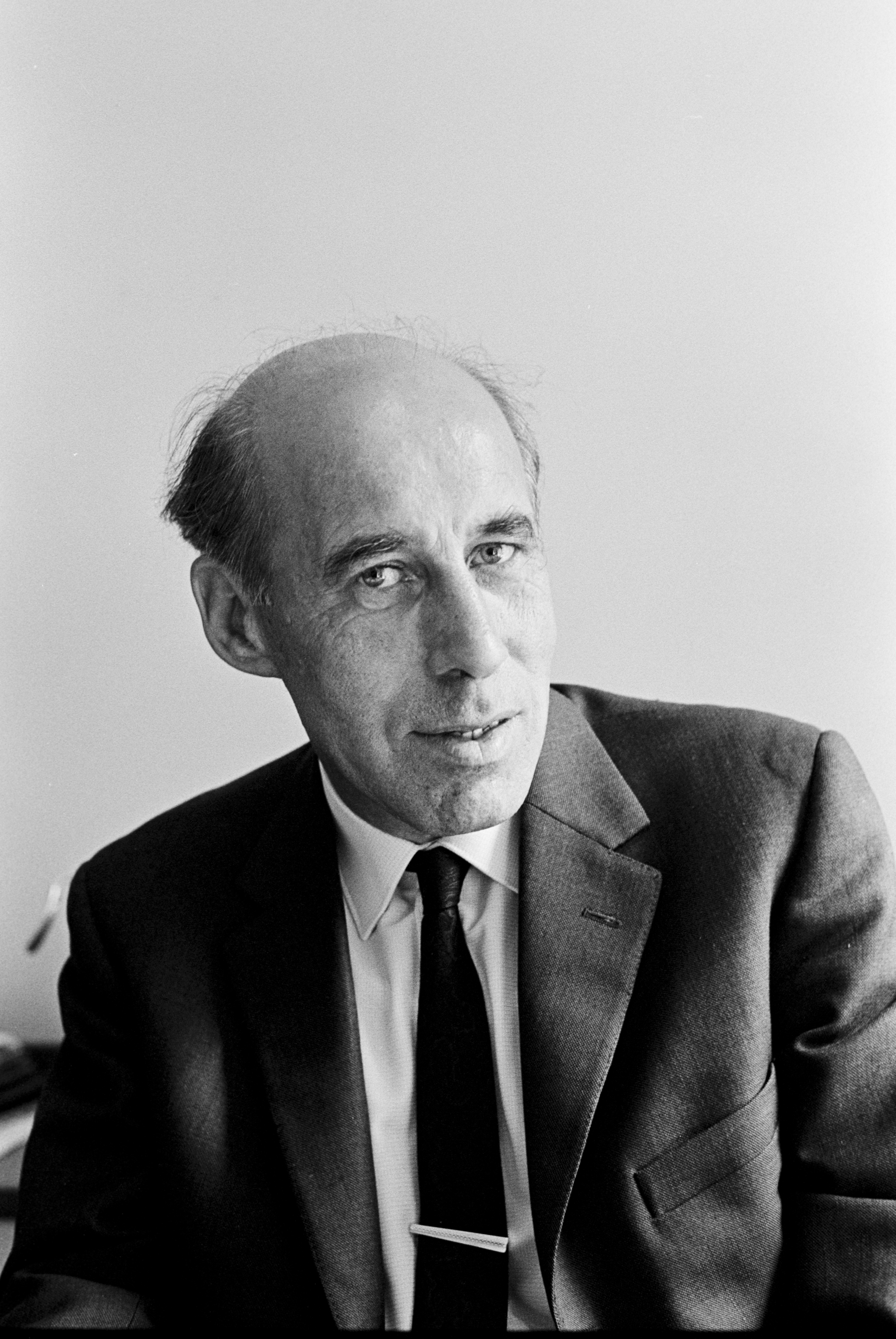
Guttorm Hansen

- 3 November
  - Guttorm Hansen, writer and politician (died 2009)
  - Gerhard Knoop, stage producer and theatre director (died 2009).
- 26 November – Sven Oluf Sørensen, physicist (died 2017).
- 27 November – Johannes Bråten, politician (died 1997)
- 29 November – Eva Børresen, ceramist (died 2022).

=== December ===
- 5 December – Hallvard Eika, politician and Minister (died 1989)
- 8 December – Ivar Martinsen, speed skater (died 2018)
- 12 December – Tollef Landsverk, judge and civil servant (died 1988)
- 19 December – Trygve Brudevold, bobsledder (died 2021) .
- 20 December – Ludvig Eikaas, painter, sculptor and printmaker (died 2010).

=== Full date missing ===
- Sverre Bergh, spy in Nazi Germany during World War II (died 2006)
- Bjarte Birkeland, literary researcher (died 2000)
- Jens-Halvard Bratz, businessman, politician and Minister (died 2005)
- Rolf Arthur Hansen, politician and minister (died 2006)
- Simen Skjønsberg, journalist and writer (died 1993)

== Notable deaths ==
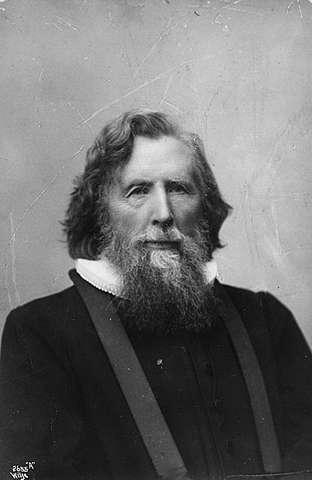
Christopher Bruun

- 24 January – Hagbard Berner, lawyer, politician and newspaper editor (born 1839).
- 3 April – Fernanda Nissen, journalist, literary critic, theatre critic, politician and feminist pioneer (born 1862)
- 18 May – Johan Henrik Paasche Thorne, businessperson and politician (born 1843)
- 17 July – Christopher Bruun, Norwegian priest and educator.

=== Full date unknown ===
- Anders Bergene, businessperson (born 1855)
- Oskar Fredriksen, speed skater (born 1872)
- Knut Gunnarsson Helland, Hardanger fiddle maker (born 1880)
- Baard Iversen, businessperson and politician (born 1836)
- Olaj Olsen, jurist and politician (born 1851)
- Steinar Schjøtt, philologist and lexicographer (born 1844)
- Andreas Lauritz Thune, engineer and businessman (born 1848)
