= 1922 in Norway =

- Centuries: 18th; 19th; 20th; 21st
- Decades: 1900s; 1910s; 1920s; 1930s; 1940s
- See also: List of years in Norway

Events in the year 1922 in Norway.

== Incumbents ==
- Monarch – Haakon VII.

== Events ==
- 8 January – The Social Democratic Youth League of Norway is founded.
- 30 November – The establishment of Norwegian government-owned alcoholic beverage retailer "Vinmonopolet".
- Fridtjof Nansen is awarded the Nobel Peace Prize for his work as a League of Nations High Commissioner.
- Municipal and county elections are held throughout the country.

== Popular culture ==
=== Sports ===
- Ole Reistad, pentathlete, is awarded the Egebergs Ærespris for achievements in multiple sports.

=== Literature ===
- The Olav Duun novel I ungdommen (Odin Grows Up) from the work Juvikfolket (The People of Juvik, 1918–23), was published.

== Notable births ==
- 6 January – Finn Mortensen, composer, critic and educator (died 1983)
- 15 January – Eva Bull Holte, painter and printmaker (died 1993).
- 20 January – Bjørn Endreson, actor, stage producer and theatre director (died 1998)
- 25 January
  - Just Faaland, political economist (died 2017)
  - Kåre Tveter, painter (died 2012)
- 2 February – Sigbjørn Hølmebakk, author (died 1981)
- 11 February – Svenn Stray, politician and Minister (died 2012)
- 13 February – Jørgen Sønstebø, politician (died 2013)
- 10 March – Dagmar Lahlum, resistance member and agent (died 1999)
- 15 March – Kristoffer Lepsøe, rower and Olympic bronze medallist (died 2006).
- 8 April – Odd Steinar Holøs, politician (died 2001)
- 14 April – Viking Olver Eriksen, nuclear physicist (died 2014)
- 30 April – Frank Olsen, resistance member, executed (died 1945)
- 16 May – Norveig Karlsen, gymnast (died 1993).
- 18 May – Gerda Boyesen, founder of Biodynamic Psychology (died 2005)
- 23 May – Edith Ranum, crime fiction writer (died 2002).
- 29 May – Edith Roger, dancer, choreographer and stage director. (died 2023)
- 7 June – Vilhelm Aubert, sociologist (died 1988)
- 10 June – Edvard Hagerup Bull, composer (died 2012)
- 10 June – Erling Danielsen, politician (died 2010)
- 13 June – Gunnar Konsmo, speed skater (died 1996)
- 14 June – Sven Olsen, politician (died 2001)
- 26 June – Reidun Andersson, politician (died 1992)
- 28 June – Jostein Goksøyr, microbiologist (died 2000)
- 6 July – Thorolf Rafto, human rights activist and professor in Economic History (died 1986)
- 7 July – Reidar Torp, Norwegian military officer (died 2017)
- 8 July – Torodd Hauer, speed skater (died 2010)
- 17 July – Olina Storsand, politician (died 2021)
- 24 July – Per Hansson, journalist and writer (died 1982).
- 26 July – Johan Trondsen, politician (died 2018)
- 27 July – Ambjørg Sælthun, politician (died 2012)
- 7 September – Bodil Aakre, jurist and politician (died 2008)
- 28 September – Liv Dommersnes, actress and reciter of poetry (died 2014)
- 2 October – Hallvard Rieber-Mohn, writer and Dominican priest (died 1982).
- 8 October – Erik Diesen, revue writer and radio and television personality (died 1999).
- 8 October – Helge Stormorken, veterinarian and physician (died 2019)
- 20 October – Kjell Bloch Sandved, author, lecturer and nature photographer. (died 2015)
- 4 November – Reidar Due, politician (died 2021)
- 12 November – Knut Østby, sprint canoer and Olympic silver medallist (died 2010)
- 13 November – Aud Schønemann, actress (died 2006)
- 22 November – Aksel Jacobsen Bogdanoff, communist (died 1971)
- 22 December – Odd Wang Sørensen, international soccer player (died 2004)
- 28 December – Ragnar Christiansen, politician and Minister (died 1994)

== Deaths ==
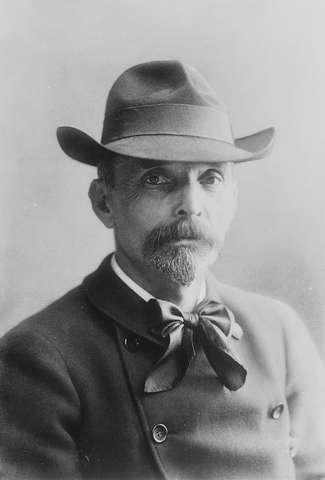
Hjalmar Welhaven

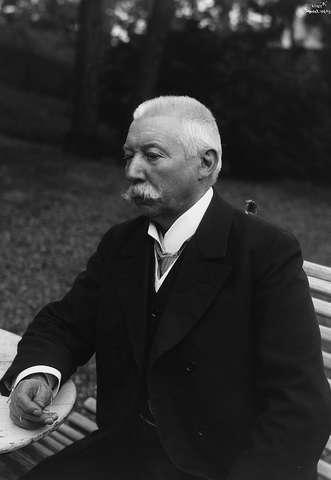
Thorvald Lammers

- 7 January – Jørg Tofte Jebsen, physicist (born 1888)
- 23 January – Stephan Sinding, sculptor (born 1846)
- 6 February – Kyrre Grepp, politician (born 1879)
- 14 February – Magnus Halvorsen, politician (born 1853)
- 22 February – Frithjof Olsen, gymnast and Olympic silver medallist (born 1882)
- 7 March – Axel Thue, mathematician (born 1863)
- 10 March – Anton Johan Rønneberg, politician (born 1856)
- 3 April – Aasulv Olsen Bryggesaa, politician and Minister (born 1866)
- 18 April – Hjalmar Welhaven, architect, palace manager, and sportsman (born 1850)
- 5 May – Carl Sofus Lumholtz, discoverer and ethnographer (born 1851)
- 13 June – Fredrik Stang Lund, politician and Minister (born 1859)
- 21 August – Jørgen Løvland, politician and Prime Minister of Norway (born 1848)
- 5 September – Alvilde Prydz, novelist (born 1846)
- 7 September – Hans G. Jensen, tailor, trade unionist and politician (born 1856)
- 27 October – Hans Henrik Reusch, geologist (born 1852)
- 25 December – Jørgen Christian Knudsen, ship-owner and politician (born 1843)
