= 2003 in Norway =

- Centuries: 19th; 20th; 21st
- Decades: 1980s; 1990s; 2000s; 2010s; 2020s
- See also: List of years in Norway

Events in the year 2003 in Norway.

== Incumbents ==
- Monarch – Harald V.
- Regent – Haakon – from 25 November 2003 until 12 April 2004 (during the King's treatment for cancer and the subsequent convalescence period)
- Prime Minister – Kjell Magne Bondevik (Christian Democratic Party)

== Events ==
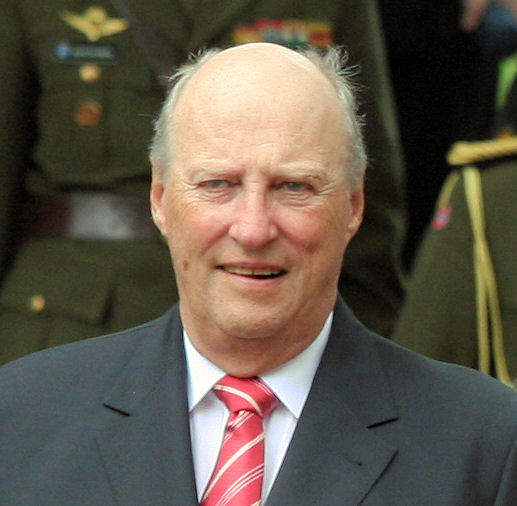
King Harald V successfully undergoes a 5½-hour cancer operation

=== March ===
- 19 March – A man dies and four are injured in a blasting accident in Namsos Municipality.

=== May ===
- 15 May - Discovery of high levels of chemicals in whale meat leads to pregnant women being warned not to eat it.

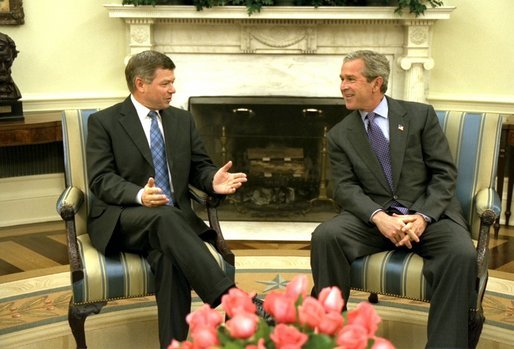
Norwegian Prime Minister Kjell Magne Bondevik (left) meets with U.S. President George W. Bush (right) at the Oval Office in White House, Washington, D.C., on 27 May 2003.

- 25 May – After docking in Miami at 05:00, SS Norway is severely damaged by a boiler explosion at 06:30, that kills 7, and injures 17 crew members. A few weeks later it is announced by NCL that she will never sail again as a commercial ocean liner.

=== June ===
- 23 June - World Refugee Day in Norway. UNHCR, together with the Norwegian Refugee Council (NRC), set up a mock refugee camp in central Oslo.

=== September ===
- 15 September – Norwegian county council elections, and municipal and county elections are held throughout the country.

=== October ===
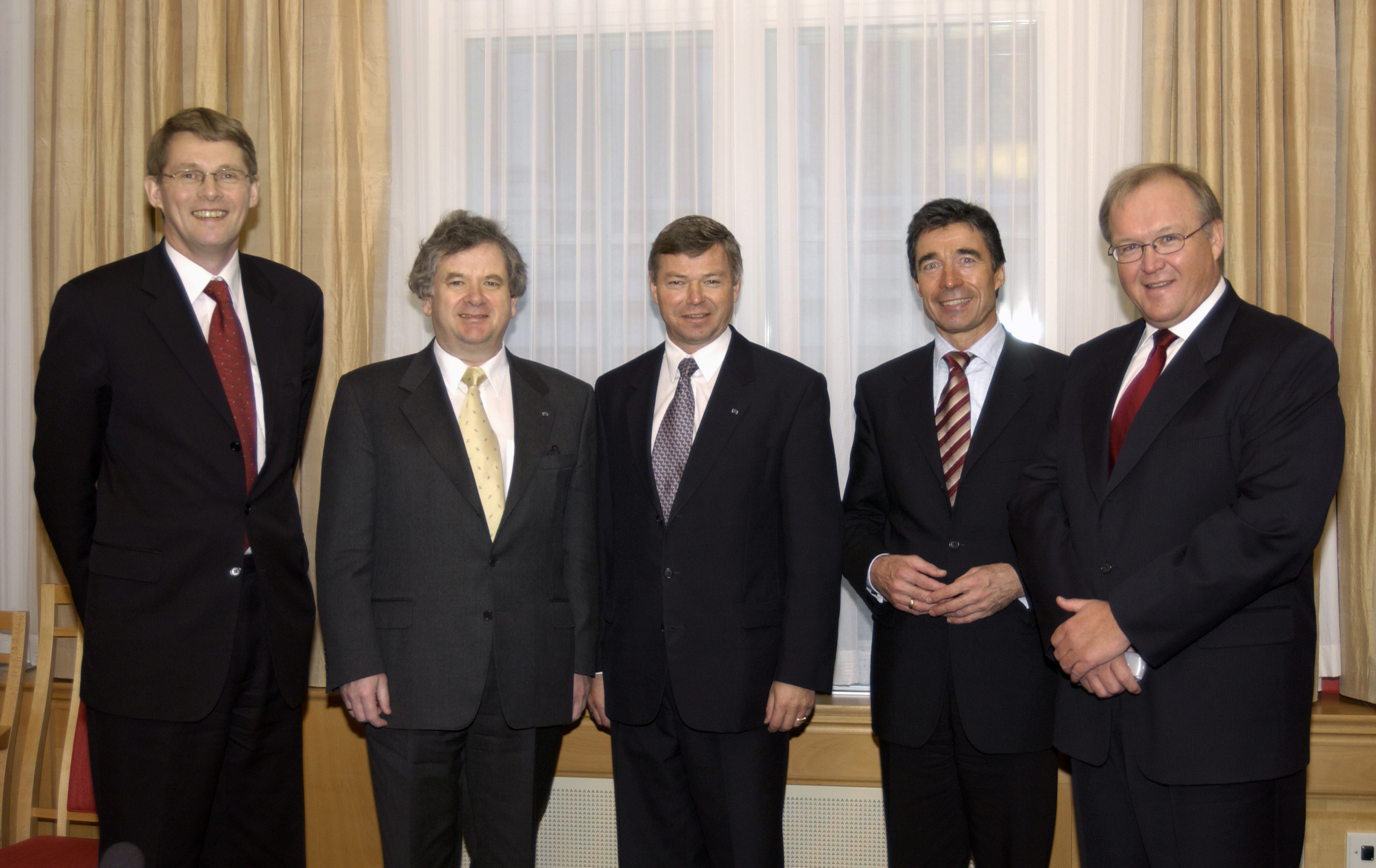
Five Nordic Prime Ministers (Matti Vanhanen (left) from Finland, Davíð Oddsson (second left) from Iceland, Kjell Magne Bondevik (center) from Norway, Anders Fogh Rasmussen (second right) from Denmark and Göran Persson (right) from Sweden) at the Nordic Council Session in Oslo, Norway, on 27 October 2003.

=== December ===
- 1 December – King Harald V was announced to be suffering from bladder cancer.
- 10 December – Shirin Ebadi of Iran receives the Nobel Peace Prize in Oslo, Norway.
- 12 December – Keiko, the orca whale who starred in the 1993 film Free Willy, dies of pneumonia while in the Taknes Bay located at the Arasvikfjord in Norway, where he had lived in the recent years.

== Popular culture ==
- Bare på jobb, a Norwegian comedy film is released.

=== Music ===
- Norway competed in the Eurovision Song Contest 2003, represented by Jostein Hasselgård with the song "I'm Not Afraid to Move On". The song was chosen as the Norwegian entry for the 2003 contest through the Melodi Grand Prix contest.

== Notable births ==
- 3 January – Nicolai Skoglund, footballer
- 18 January – Odin Thiago Holm, footballer
- 21 January – Andreas Endresen, footballer
- 9 February – Iker Carew, footballer (born in Spain)
- 16 February – Bryan Fiabema, footballer
- 21 February – Selma Pettersen, footballer
- 23 February – Christos Zafeiris, footballer (born in Greece)
- 16 March – Pawel Chrupalla, footballer (born in Poland)
- 18 March – Seedy Jatta, footballer
- 29 April – Maud Angelica Behn, daughter of Ari Behn and Princess Märtha Louise of Norway
- 14 May – Maja Furu Sæteren, handballer
- 16 May – Kristian Bernt Torgersen, footballer
- 26 May – Simen Kvia-Egeskog, footballer
- 8 June – Mathias Emilsen, footballer
- 10 June – Sondre Auklend, footballer
- 9 July – Tobias Fjeld Gulliksen, footballer
- 10 July – Mina Bergersen, footballer
- 12 July – Oscar Bobb, footballer
- 22 July – Solveig Vik, politician
- 24 July – Max Normann Williamsen, footballer
- 26 August – Leo Hjelde, footballer
- 7 September – Kristian Arnstad, footballer
- 22 October – Petter Nosakhare Dahl, footballer
- 24 October – Leander Øy, footballer
- 30 October – Thea Minyan Bjørseth, ski jumper
- 6 December – Mathias Fjørtoft Løvik, footballer
- 21 December – Jasper Silva Torkildsen, footballer

== Notable deaths ==
=== January to June ===
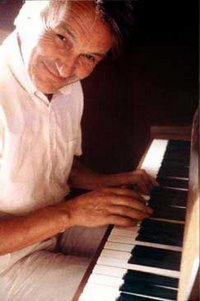
Axel Jensen

- 13 January – Andreas Holm, politician (born 1906)
- 24 January – Rolf Kirkvaag, journalist and radio and television personality (born 1920)
- 13 February – Axel Jensen, author and poet (born 1932)
- 3 March – Kitty Petrine Fredriksen, politician (born 1910).
- 6 March – Claus Helberg, resistance fighter and mountain guide (born 1919)
- 17 March – Anne-Olaug Ingeborgrud, politician (born 1925)
- 26 March – Gerd Benneche, jurist and journalist (born 1913).
- 29 March – Herbjørn Sørebø, media personality (born 1933).
- 5 April – Sigurd Manneråk, politician (born 1942)
- 6 April – Ole Otto Paus, General and diplomat (born 1910)
- 14 April – Olai Ingemar Eikeland, politician (born 1915)
- 21 April – Helga Dagsland, nurse educator (born 1910).
- 22 April – Ola H. Kveli, politician (born 1921)
- 9 May – Hans Engnestangen, speed skater and World Champion (born 1908)
- 14 May – Ingvar Lars Helle, politician (born 1933)
- 24 May – Arne Skouen, film director and journalist (born 1913)
- 30 May – Lars T. Platou, electrical engineer and politician (born 1920)
- 13 June – Tor Stokke, actor (born 1928)
- 27 June – Magne Aarøen, politician (born 1944)

=== July to December ===
- 6 July – Arne Kielland, journalist and politician (born 1939).
- 12 July – Rudolf Næss, illustrator (born 1914)
- 12 August – Håkon Kyllingmark, politician and Minister (born 1915)
- 5 September – Harry Hansen, politician (born 1919)
- 9 September – Otto Lyng, politician (born 1926)
- 8 October – Petter Thomassen, politician and Minister (born 1941)
- 24 October – Eva Haalke, ballet teacher and dancer (born 1912).
- 10 November – Edvard Beyer, literary historian, literary critic and professor (born 1920)
- 3 December – Kristine Rusten, politician (born 1940)
- 24 December – Gunnar Alf Larsen, politician (born 1919)

=== Full date unknown ===
- Harald Magne Elstad, judge (born 1913)
