= 1998 in Norway =

- Centuries: 18th; 19th; 20th; 21st
- Decades: 1970s; 1980s; 1990s; 2000s; 2010s
- See also: List of years in Norway

Events in the year 1998 in Norway.

== Incumbents ==
- Monarch – Harald V.
- Prime Minister – Kjell Magne Bondevik (Christian Democratic Party)

== Events ==
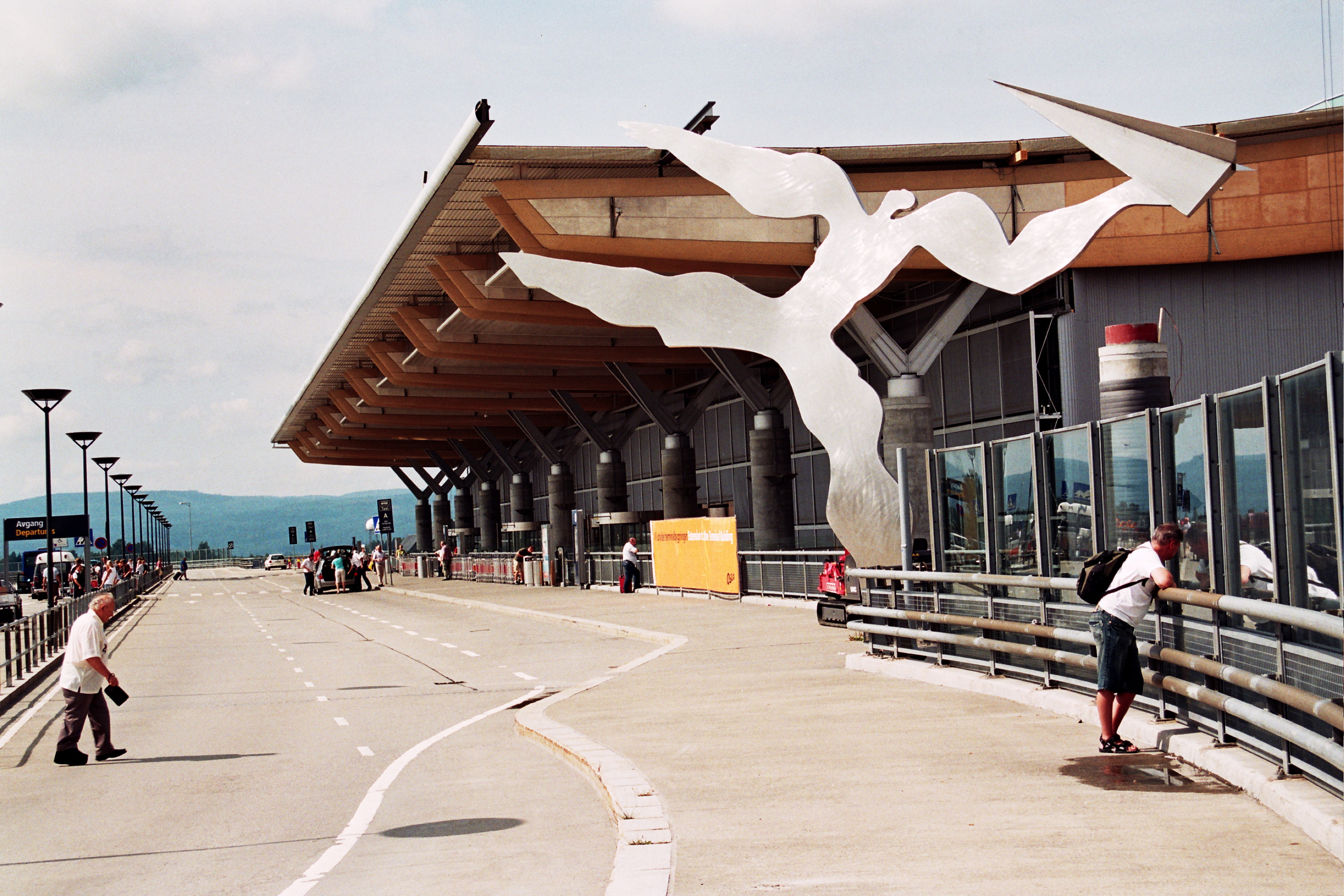
On October 8 the Gardermoen airport was opened

- 23 June - Norway beat reigning world champion Brazil 2-1 in the group stage of the FIFA World Cup, causing huge celebrations throughout the nation.
- 26 September – Christian Conservative Party merged with the New Future Coalition Party to form the Christian fundamentalist party Christian Unity Party.
- 7 October – Operations cease at Oslo Airport, Fornebu
- 8 October – The main airport serving Oslo is moved from the Fornebu airport to the all-new Gardermoen airport.

== Popular culture ==
=== Music ===
- 3 May - Norwegian pop band a-ha release the album Stay on These Roads, their third studio album.

== Notable births ==
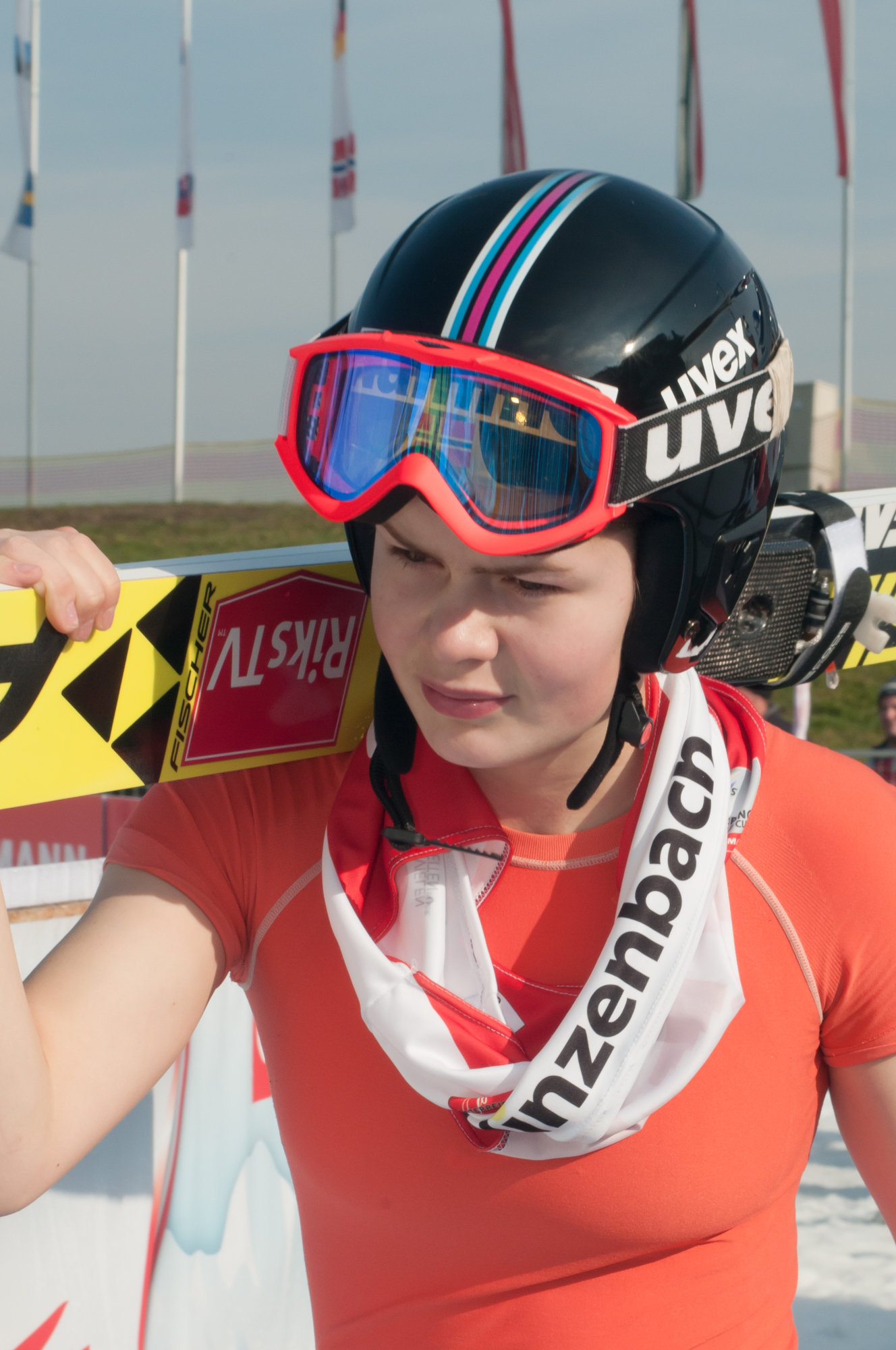
Anna Odine Strøm

- 14 February – Sander Berge, footballer
- 25 February – Andrea Berntzen, actress and student
- 8 March – Jenny Stene, sport shooter.
- 17 April
  - Kristoffer Ajer, footballer
  - Anna Odine Strøm, ski jumper.
- 10 June – Johan-Sebastian Christiansen, chess player.
- 15 June – Emil Hansson, Footballer
- 20 June – Kajsa Vickhoff Lie, alpine skier.
- 21 July – Magnus Bøe, cross-country skier (born in South Korea)
- 6 August – Einar Lurås Oftebro, Nordic combined skier
- 21 August – Fredrik André Bjørkan, footballer
- 7 September – Ola Solbakken, footballer
- 30 September – Narve Gilje Nordås, athlete competing in middle-distance and long-distance events.
- 17 December – Martin Ødegaard, footballer
- 22 December – Casper Ruud, tennis player

== Notable deaths ==
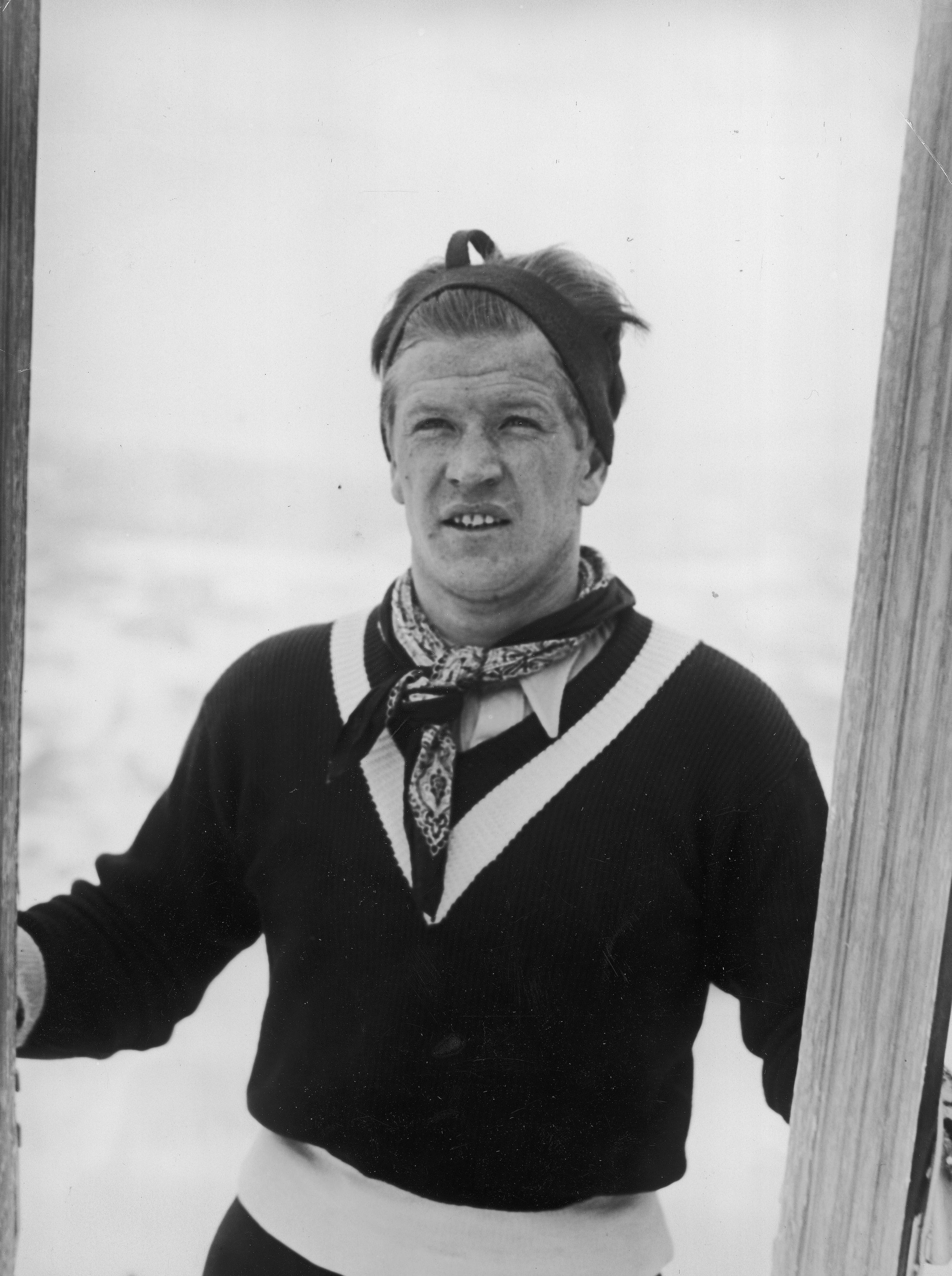
Birger Ruud, ski jumper, Olympic Champion and World Champion

- 8 January – Audun Hetland, illustrator (born 1920).
- 26 January – Olaf Kortner, politician (b.1920)
- 28 January – Asbjørn Berg-Hansen, boxer (b.1912)
- 4 February – Odd Winger, journalist and writer (born 1923).
- 18 February – Rolv Ryssdal, judge (b.1914)
- 1 April – Anne Gullestad, actress and theatre director (b.1925)
- 3 April – Paul Svarstad, politician (b.1917)
- 9 May – Frithjof Clausen, wrestler (born 1916).
- 8 June – Eva R. Finstad, politician (b.1933)
- 13 June – Birger Ruud, ski jumper, twice Olympic gold medallist and three time World Champion (b.1911)
- 17 June – Aage Eriksen, wrestler and Olympic silver medallist (b.1917)
- 28 June – Brita Collett Paus, humanitarian leader and founder of Fransiskushjelpen (b.1917)
- 9 July – Knut Bergsland, linguist (b.1914)
- 9 July – Halvor J. Sandsdalen, farmer, journalist, poet, novelist, playwright and children's writer (b. 1911).
- 18 July – Lars Mathias Hille Esmark, civil servant and business person in the tourist industry (born 1908).
- 19 July – Rune Nilsen, triple jumper (b.1923)
- 26 July – Olav Bø, folklorist (born 1918).
- 28 July – Yngvar Løchen, sociologist (born 1931)
- 30 July – Axel Buch, politician (b.1930)
- 30 July – Laila Schou Nilsen, speed skater, alpine skier and tennis player (b.1919)
- 31 July – Erling Evensen, cross country skier and Olympic bronze medallist (b.1914)
- 23 August – Rolf Søder, actor (b.1918)
- 1 September – Eystein Bærug, politician (b.1923)
- 8 September – Øystein Elgarøy, astronomer (born 1929)
- 13 September – Trygve Moe, politician (b.1920)
- 16 September – John Systad, long-distance runner (b.1912)
- 26 September – Gudrun Dorothea Ræder, diplomat (born 1908).
- 1 October – Sjur Lindebrække, banker and politician (b.1909)
- 5 October – Arne Øien, economist, politician and Minister (b.1928)
- 13 October – Thomas Byberg, speed skater and Olympic silver medallist (b.1916)
- 27 October – Reidar Kvammen, international soccer player (b.1914)
- 2 November – Sverre Brodahl, Nordic skier and Olympic silver medallist (b.1909)
- 7 November – Kåre Orud, sculptor (born 1914)
- 11 November – Sam Melberg, sports diver and sports instructor (b. 1912).
- 12 November – Bjørn Endreson, actor, stage producer and theatre director (b.1922)
- 15 November – Asbjørn Øye, politician (b.1902)
- 4 December – Egil Johansen, jazz drummer, teacher, composer and arranger (b.1934)
- 4 December – Lilli Gjerløw, archivist (b.1910).
- 10 December – Trygve Haugeland, politician and Minister (b.1914)
- 31 December – Erling Norvik, politician (b.1928)
