= Hestetun =

Hestetun is a Norwegian surname. Notable people with the surname include:

- Anne Valen Hestetun (1920–2009), Norwegian politician
- Per Klingenberg Hestetun (1877–1928), Norwegian politician
