= Lahlum =

Lahlum is a Norwegian surname. Notable people with the name include:

- Dagmar Lahlum (1922–1999), World War II Norwegian Resistance member
- Hans Olav Lahlum (born 1973), Norwegian historian, author, chess player and politician
