= 2001 in Norway =

- Centuries: 19th; 20th; 21st
- Decades: 1980s; 1990s; 2000s; 2010s; 2020s
- See also: List of years in Norway

Events in the year 2001 in Norway.

== Incumbents ==
- Monarch – Harald V.
- Prime Minister – Jens Stoltenberg (Labour Party) until 19 October, Kjell Magne Bondevik (Christian Democratic Party)

== Events ==
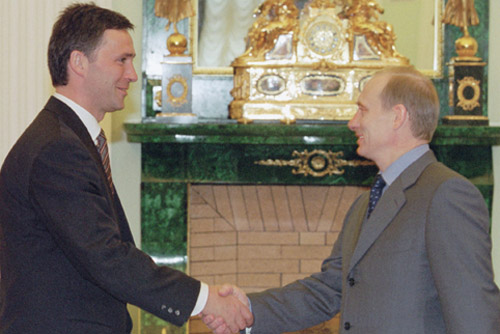
Norwegian Prime Minister Jens Stoltenberg (left) meets Russian President Vladimir Putin (right) at the Kremlin in Moscow, Russia, on 19 June 2001.

=== January ===
- 26 January: Murder of Benjamin Hermansen.

=== February ===
- February – Former Prime Minister, then foreign affairs minister Thorbjørn Jagland makes a political scandal when he jokingly refers to Gabon's president Omar Bongo, due for a state visit to Norway, as "Bongo from Congo".
- February – Around 40,000 people in Oslo march in a rally to express their outrage and devastation over the racially motivated murder in Holmlia, Oslo of a young black Norwegian boy, Benjamin Hermansen at the hands of a group af neo-Nazis. Marches take place simultaneously all over Norway.

=== March ===
- 25 March – The Schengen Agreement treaty comes into force in Norway.

=== June ===
- 18 June – The state-owned oil and gas company Statoil is listed on the Oslo Stock Exchange.

=== August ===
- August – The Bratsberg Line in Nedre Telemark closes down. It was opened in 1917.
- 25 August – Wedding of Haakon, Crown Prince of Norway, and Mette-Marit Tjessem Høiby.

=== September ===
- 10 September – The 2001 Norwegian parliamentary election takes place. The Norwegian Labour Party won a plurality of votes and seats, closely followed by the Conservative Party. The Labour Party was unable to form a government, and a centre-right coalition of the Conservative Party, the Christian People's Party and the Liberal Party was formed, led by Norwegian Prime Minister Kjell Magne Bondevik of the Christian Democratic Party.

=== October ===
- 19 October – Norwegian Prime Minister Kjell Magne Bondevik's Second Cabinet was appointed.

=== November ===
- 3 November – Population Census: 4,520,900 inhabitants in Norway.
- 17 November – Eurasian harvest mouse is observed in Norway for the first time.

== Popular culture ==
=== Music ===
- Norway in the Eurovision Song Contest 2001

=== Literature ===
- Jan Kjærstad is awarded the Nordic Council Literature Prize, for The Discoverer.

== Notable births ==
- 12 January – Vilde Nilsen, Paralympic cross-country skier and biathlete
- 12 February – Siri Lehland, model
- 16 April – Mia Svele, handball player
- 14 July – Maren Grøthe, politician.

== Notable deaths ==
=== January to June ===
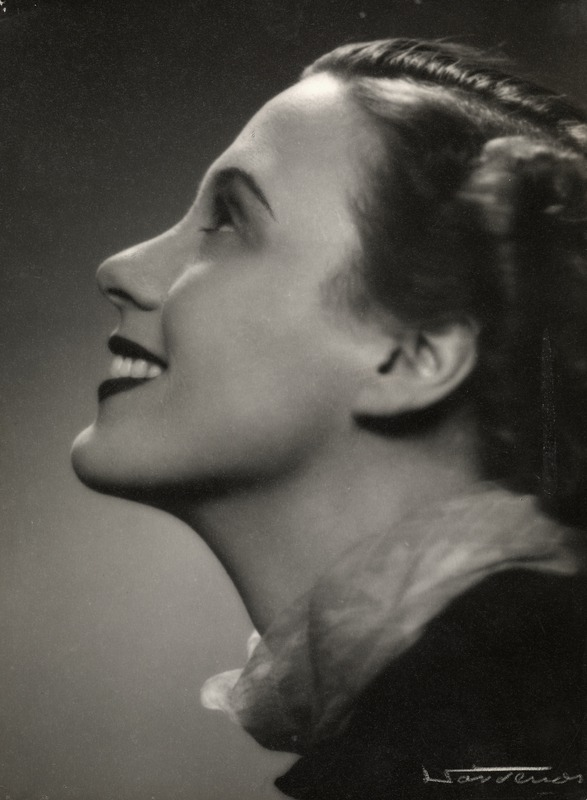
Rønnaug Alten

- 12 January – Gunnar Olram, actor and stage director (born 1908).
- 17 January – Sigurd Vestad, cross country skier (born 1907)
- 20 January – Rønnaug Alten, actress (born 1910).
- 26 January – Benjamin Hermansen, murder victim (born 1985)
- 4 February – Asbjørn Antoni Holm, politician (born 1921)
- 8 February – Ivo Caprino, film director and writer (born 1920)
- 8 February – Torkell Tande, politician (born 1901)
- 13 February – Knut Theodor Gleditsch, sports commentator (born 1938)
- 14 February – Olav Reiersøl, statistician and econometrician (born 1908)
- 8 March – David Sandved, architect (born 1912)
- 11 March – Finn Ferner, sailor and Olympic silver medallist (born 1920)
- 22 March – Rolf Birger Pedersen, football player and coach (born 1939)
- 28 March – Alf Frotjold, trade unionist (born 1929)
- 29 March – Helge Ingstad, explorer (born 1899)
- 4 April – Sverre Engen, skier, ski coach, ski area manager and filmmaker in America (born 1911)
- 10 April – Knut Andreas Knudsen, politician (born 1919)
- 12 April – Reidar Hirsti, newspaper editor and politician (born 1925)
- 24 April – Gro Anita Schønn, singer (born 1950).
- 26 April – Sverre Walter Rostoft, politician and Minister (born 1912)
- 7 May – Thor Støre, politician (born 1924)
- 19 May – Vidkunn Hveding, politician and Minister (born 1921)
- 27 May – Knut Myrstad, politician (born 1913)
- 5 June – Sigmund P. Haave, politician (born 1916)
- 14 June – Andreas Wormdahl, politician (born 1911)

=== July to December ===
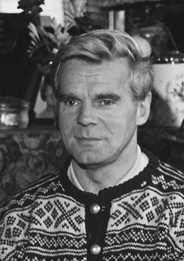
Jakob Weidemann

- 2 July – Fredrik Stabel, illustrator and satirical writer (born 1914).
- 15 July – Helge Rognlien, politician and Minister (born 1920)
- 21 July – Gudmund Grytøyr, politician (born 1920)
- 24 July – Sven Olsen, politician (born 1922)
- 31 August – Odd Steinar Holøs, politician (born 1922)
- 6 September – Dagny Hald, ceramist (born 1936).
- 12 October – Gunnar Thorleif Hvashovd, politician (born 1924)
- 27 October – Ellisiv Steen, literary scholar (b. 1908).
- 1 November – Engly Lie, politician (born 1919)
- 3 November – Liv Paulsen, sprinter and shot putter (born 1925).
- 8 November – Alf Hellevik, philologist (born 1909).
- 18 November – Roar Hauglid, art historian (born 1910).
- 1 December – Olav Mosebekk, illustrator and painter (born 1910).
- 10 December – Knut Fægri, botanist (born 1909)
- 15 December – Leif Kolflaath, politician (born 1927)
- 19 December – Jakob Weidemann, painter (born 1923)
- 28 December – Arne Rettedal, politician and Minister (born 1926)

=== Full date unknown ===
- Odd Abrahamsen, poet (born 1924)
- Håkon Flood, professor of inorganic chemistry (born 1905)
- Henriette Bie Lorentzen, humanist, peace activist, feminist and editor (born 1911)
- Anfinn Lund, civil servant and politician (born 1926)
- Nils Slaatto, architect (born 1923)
