= Johan Brun =

Norwegian photographer (1922–2021)

- Born: 19 October 1922; Uvdal, Norway
- Died: 27 April 2021 (aged 98)
- Occupation: Photographer
- Employer: Dagbladet

Johan Brun (19 October 1922 – 27 April 2021) was a Norwegian photographer.

== Personal life ==
Brun was born in Uvdal on 19 October 1922, a son of farmer Henrik Natvig Brun and schoolteacher Brita Bøckmann. In 1954 he married Ingrid Eliassen (born 1931).

== Career ==
Brun worked as photographer for the newspaper Dagbladet from 1948. He became known for his sports pictures, and later, nature pictures. His books include Kapp til Kapp (with Richard Papes; 1956) and Vassfaret (1969; with Per Hohle), and he illustrated a series of historical books by Vera Henriksen.

== Selected works ==
- Brun, Johan; Hohle, Per (1969). Gjennom Vidalen og Vassfaret. Oslo: Gyldendal. OCLC 13065873.
- Markusson, Marius; Brun, Johan (1969). Safari. Øst-afrikanske hverdagsbilder. Oslo: Gyldendal. OCLC 46949745.
- Henriksen, Vera (1984). Verdenstreet : mennesker og makter i Odins tid. With photos by Johan Brun and vignettes by Gro Eriksson. Oslo: Aschehoug. ISBN 9788203113741. OCLC 11953087.
- Barth, Edvard K., ed. (1985). Hardangervidda. Norges nasjonalparker. Vol. 11. Johan Brun (co-editor, photos). Oslo: Luther Forlag. ISBN 9788253141862. OCLC 472821248.
- Vesaas, Olav (1992). Telemark dikt og draum. Photographed by Johan Brun. Oslo: Damm. ISBN 9788251777964. OCLC 1028272095.
- Brun, Johan (2003). Våre bruer. Summary in English by Henning Gundersen. Oslo: Damm. ISBN 9788249607600. OCLC 493465492.
- Borge, Per Erik; Jacobsen, Therese (2003). Norge lys og landskap. Photos by Johan Brun. Oslo: Aschehoug.
- Bjorli, Trond (2005). År og dag : Johan Bruns fotografier. Presentation of Johan Brun as photographer, a collaboration between Norsk Folkemuseum, Dagbladet and Pax Forlag. Oslo: Pax Forlag. ISBN 9788253027982. OCLC 1028425142.
