= Elstad =

Elstad is a surname. Notable people with this surname include:

- Anne Karin Elstad (1938–2012), Norwegian author
- Fanny Elstad, birth name of Fanny Elsta (1899–1978), Norwegian opera singer
- Harald Magne Elstad (1913–2003), Norwegian judge
- Leonard M. Elstad (1899–1990), American academic
