= Eva Scheer =

Norwegian writer (1915 –1999)

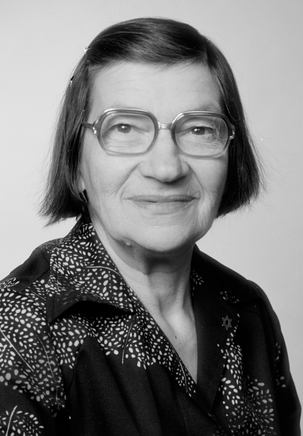
- Scheer in 1981
- Born: 13 March 1915; Oslo, Norway
- Died: 22 June 1999 (aged 84)
- Occupations: journalist, literary critic, translator and author

Eva Scheer (13 March 1915 – 22 June 1999) was a Norwegian journalist, literary critic, translator and author.

== Personal life ==
Scheer was born on 13 March 1915 in Oslo to Jewish immigrants from Lithuania. In 1942, during the German occupation of Norway, several of her family members were deported and eventually murdered in the Auschwitz concentration camp, while Scheer managed to flee to Sweden.

== Career ==
After World War II, Scheer worked as journalist for the newspaper Arbeiderbladet. She made her literary debut in 1948, with the book Vi bygger i sand. She was a co-founder of the Norwegian Association of Literary Translators in 1948, and also worked as literary critic. She was a reporter for Arbeiderbladet in Palestine and Israel during the formation of the state of Israel in 1948, and her books on this issue include Vi møttes i Jerusalem from 1951, and Israel: dobbelt-løftets land from 1967. In 1954 she wrote the children's book Teddybjørn på bølgelengde.

Her book Posene på gjerdestolpen from 1977 contains Jewish fairytales and folklore translated for children. Her later books include Papirbroen: jødisk drøm og virkelighet (1979), Tre er fedrene, fire mødrene (1981), En smak av vintreets frukt (1982), and Hundene gjør ved vanningsstedet (1983).

== Death and legacy ==
Scheer died on 22 June 1999. The book Jødiske fortellinger: Fra shtetl til Grünerløkka was published in 2015, containing a collection of Jewish stories written down by Scheer. In 2015 she was also part of the exhibition Kvinner i jiddisch kultur hosted at the Jewish Museum in Oslo.
