= Jostein Goksøyr =

Norwegian microbiologist (1922–2000)

Jostein Goksøyr (28 June 1922 – 5 December 2000) was a Norwegian microbiologist.

He was born in Kopervik, and took the dr.philos. degree in 1955. He was hired as a lecturer at the University of Bergen in 1956, and was later professor from 1966 to 1989. He was a member of the Norwegian Academy of Science and Letters from 1970 and the Royal Society of Sciences in Uppsala from 1987.

A planctomycete bacterium, Bythopirellula goksoyri, identified from the iron-hydroxide deposits at the Mohns Ridge, a part of the Arctic Mid-Ocean Ridge, is named in honour of Goksøyr.
