= Iker Carew =

Spanish footballer (born 2003)

Personal information
- Full name: Iker Carew Erazo Ormaza
- Date of birth: 9 February 2003 (age 23)
- Place of birth: Murcia, Spain
- Height: 1.78 m (5 ft 10 in)
- Position: Forward

Team information
- Current team: Frigg
- Number: 22

Youth career
- Odd
- Academia de Ceider Erazo
- 2017–2019: Odd

College career
Years	Team	Apps	(Gls)
2022–2023	Charleston Cougars	33	(6)
2024	Kentucky Wildcats	14	(2)

Senior career*
Years	Team	Apps	(Gls)
2019	Odd 3	8	(2)
2020–2022	Odd 2	29	(1)
2022	Urædd	10	(2)
2024	Midwest United	5	(1)
2026–	Frigg	9	(5)
- * Club domestic league appearances and goals as of 5 June 2026

Iker Carew Erazo Ormaza (born 9 February 2003) is a Spanish footballer who plays as a forward for Frigg.

== Early life ==
Carew was born in Murcia, Spain, but moved to Skien, Norway at the age of two. He joined the academy of Odd, but had to return to his parents’ native Ecuador after his grandfather needed support. While in Ecuador, he played for the academy that his father set up, Academia de Ceider Erazo.

== Club career ==
=== Early career ===
He returned to Norway in 2017, re-joining the academy of Odd. In 2020, while still in the academy, he went on trial with English Premier League side Sheffield United. He left Odd in April 2022, stating that he was "not happy" about the way he was treated at the club. He joined Fourth Division side Urædd the same month.

=== Collegiate soccer ===
In July 2022, he moved to the United States to enrol at the College of Charleston, joining the college's soccer team, the Cougars. He scored three goals in sixteen appearances in his first season.

== Personal life ==
Carew's father, Ceider, was also a footballer, and won 27 caps for the Ecuador national football team. His brother, Jefferson, is also a footballer and played for the youth teams of Ecuador, and currently plays for Urædd.

His father decided on 'Carew' as his middle name in honour of former Norwegian international footballer John Carew, and 'Iker' as his first name after Spanish international Iker Casillas. He shares no relation with John Carew.

== Career statistics ==
=== Club ===
As of 22 February 2023.

Appearances and goals by club, season and competition
Club	Season	League			Cup		Other		Total	
Club	Season	Division	Apps	Goals	Apps	Goals	Apps	Goals	Apps	Goals
Odd 3	2019	4. divisjon	8	2	–		0	0	8	2
Odd 2	2020	2. divisjon	3	0	–		0	0	3	0
Odd 2	2021	2. divisjon	26	1	–		0	0	26	1
Odd 2	Total		29	1	0	0	0	0	29	1
Urædd	2022	4. divisjon	10	2	0	0	0	0	10	2
Midwest United	2024	USL League Two	5	1	0	0	0	0	5	1
Frigg	2026	3. divisjon	9	5	0	0	0	0	9	5
Career total			61	11	0	0	0	0	61	11
