= Johannes Bråten =

Norwegian politician

Johannes Bråten (27 November 1920 – 19 March 1997) was a Norwegian politician for the Labour Party.

He served as a deputy representative to the Norwegian Parliament from Østfold during the terms 1965–1969 and 1969–1973.
