= Bare på jobb =

- Directed by: Kjell Hammerø
- Written by: Knut Halle; Kjell Hammerø
- Starring: Geir Amundsen; Sjur Middtun; Arild Vestre; Knut Halle; Ingunn Øyen
- Release date: 21 October 2003
- Running time: 90 minutes
- Country: Norway
- Language: Norwegian

Bare på jobb ("Just Working") is a 2003 Norwegian crime comedy film directed by Kjell Hammerø, starring Geir Amundsen.

== Production and screening ==
The film was originally shot in 2001. In the spring of 2002, the Norwegian Film Fund and its consultant Erlend Loe intervened in the project, allotting 4 million kr to reshoot several scenes. The production was finished in late 2002. The film premiered at the Bergen International Film Festival on 21 October 2023.

The cinematic premiere took place on 23 January 2004. As the film was rejected by film distributors, it was only screened on select local cinemas.

== Plot ==
Robert Reiakvam (Amundsen) is an unsuccessful documentary film maker, who manages to get government support for his latest project: a documentary about debt collectors. He finds out that illegal debt collectors receive no government benefits, and changes the focus of the film to one about social injustice. When the government withdraws its funding of the film, the debt collectors, who have grown enthusiastic about the project, offer to finance it. Reiakvam accepts the money, believing it to be gift, and unwittingly becomes a character in his own movie.

== Reception ==
Few newspapers, mostly located in Vestland, reviewed the film as it was screened at the Bergen International Film Festival. Bergens Tidende and Bergensavisen both issued dice throws of 3 (out of 6). Likewise, Studvest graded it as a C. Sunnmørsposten saw positive tendencies, calling the film "tasteful". Some of the characters were over the top, however, and the "visual aspect is a little trite, and makes one think about a TV movie". On its cinematic premiere, Firdaposten gave the film a dice throw of 4.
