= Helge Stormorken =

Norwegian veterinarian and physician (1922–2019)

Helge Stormorken (8 October 1922 – 9 June 2019) was a Norwegian veterinarian and physician.

== Research and organisational activity ==
He established the cause of a worldwide fatal bleeding disease in piglets leading to its eradication. He described the multifaceted Stormorken syndrome, a mutations in f. VII, f. IX, Fibrinogen Oslo IV and V, all with clinical consequences. Nearly thirty theses on different aspects emanated from the institute together with a host of single papers from its own staff and the many US and European visitors. The most prominent of these was Holm Holmsen who made basic discoveries establishing platelets as secretory non-nucleated cells. Stormorken was active in international organisations within the field, as chairman of the International Society on Thrombosis and Haemostasis 1978–1982, as cofounder and member of the governing board in European Thrombosis Research Organisation (ETRO) 1972–1978, as an honorary member in 1997. In 1971 Oslo and his institute was chosen as the organizer and host of the first international congress in this field.

Stormorken was also the chairman of many committees, local as well as international, a teacher of medical students and other health personnel. He headed the Norwegian Red Cross team and was wounded in the French-Algerian War of 1962. His publications, mainly international, total 260.

== Career summary ==
Helge Stormorken was born in Kvam in Gudbrandsdalen, Norway and obtained his veterinary degree at the Norwegian School of Veterinary Science in 1948. He opened a veterinary practice in Otta the next year. He studied in the Medical Faculty, University of Oslo from 1954, and gained a PhD in 1957, with the thesis Comparative Studies on Clotting Mechanisms in Horse, Cow, Dog and Man. He later won the Doctor of Medicine degree in 1958. He was appointed as a professor of animal physiology at the Norwegian School of Veterinary Science in 1959. He moved to the University of Oslo in 1963, as professor and head of the University of Oslo Institute for Thrombosis Research at Rikshospitalet. Then, from 1980 to 1990, he was an assistant professor at Rikshospitalet, and from 1990 to 1995 he worked for the private company Nycomed, mainly within contrast media development. By the time of his 85th birthday he had 275 academic publications.

He was decorated with the Royal Norwegian Order of St. Olav and was one of the founders and honorary member of the European Thrombosis Research Organization, Co-chairman and Chairman of the International Society on Thrombosis and Haemostasis. In 1978–82, he was a member of several national and international committees and was visiting professor at Nobel Prize winner C. Heymans Institute in Ghent, Belgium and at The Temple University, Philadelphia. In 1962 he headed the Norwegian Red Cross team to Algeria during the liberation war from France. He lived in Sandvika, a suburb of Oslo, but originated from the Gudbrandsdal Valley.

== Publications ==
- Peeters, G; Stormorken, H; Vanschoubroek, F (April 1960). "The effect of different stimuli on milk ejection and diuresis in the lactating cow". The Journal of Endocrinology. 20 (2): 163–72. doi:10.1677/joe.0.0200163. PMID 14431375.
- Borchgrevink, CF; Egeberg, O; Pool, Judith G; Skulason, T; Stormorken, H; Waaler, B (July 1959). "A study of a case of congenital hypoprothrombinaemia". British Journal of Haematology. 5 (3): 294–301. doi:10.1111/j.1365-2141.1959.tb04037.x. PMID 13802712.
- Stormorken, H; Svenkerud, R; Slagsvold, P; Lie, H; Lundevall, J (15 June 1963). "Thrombocytopenic bleedings in young pigs due to maternal isoimmunization". Nature. 198 (4885): 1116–1117. Bibcode:1963Natur.198.1116S. doi:10.1038/1981116b0.
- Sjaastad, ØV; Stormorken, H (2 March 1963). "Diet and histamine in the ruminant". Nature. 197 (4870): 907–908. Bibcode:1963Natur.197..907S. doi:10.1038/197907a0. PMID 13977814.
- Berg, KJ; Skaga, E; Skjaeggestad, O; Stormorken, H (13 November 1965). "Effect of linseed oil on platelet adhesiveness and bleeding-time in patients with coronary heart-disease". Lancet. 2 (7420): 980–2. doi:10.1016/S0140-6736(65)92842-4. PMID 4159214.
- Prokopowicz, J; Stormorken, H (1968). "Fibrinolytic activity of leucocytes in smears of bone marrow and peripheral blood". Scandinavian Journal of Haematology. 5 (2): 129–37. doi:10.1111/j.1600-0609.1968.tb01727.x. PMID 5673825.
- Holmsen, H; Day, HJ; Stormorken, H (1969). "The blood platelet release reaction". Scandinavian Journal of Haematology. Supplementum. 8: 3–26. doi:10.1111/j.1600-0609.1969.tb01955.x. PMID 4242950.
- Stromorken, H (24 April 2009). "The release reaction of secretion: A general basic phenomenon related to phagocytosis/pinocytosis". Scandinavian Journal of Haematology. 6 (S9): 3–24. doi:10.1111/j.1600-0609.1969.tb01860.x. PMID 4908841.
- Gjønnæss, H; Stormorken, H (31 October 1970). "Blood clotting, plasma kinins and fibrinolysis". Thrombosis et Diathesis Haemorrhagica. 24 (1): 308–10. doi:10.1055/s-0038-1654238. PMID 5483971.
- Kvarstein, B; Stormorken, H (January 1971). "Influence of acetylsalicylic acid, butazolidine, colchicine, hydrocortisone, chlorpromazine and imipramine on the phagocytosis of polystyrene latex particles by human leucocytes". Biochemical Pharmacology. 20 (1): 119–24. doi:10.1016/0006-2952(71)90477-1. PMID 5570631.
- Day, HJ; Stormorken, H; Holmsen, H (1973). "Subcellular localization of platelet factor 3 and platelet factor 4". Scandinavian Journal of Haematology. 10 (4): 254–60. doi:10.1111/j.1600-0609.1973.tb00069.x. PMID 4797189.
- Dale, J; Myhre, E; Storstein, O; Stormorken, H (15 November 1975). "Proceedings: Arterial thromboembolism and prosthetic heart valves. Effects of acetylsalicylic acid". Thrombosis et Diathesis Haemorrhagica. 34 (2): 587–8. PMID 1105879.
- Dale, J; Myhre, E; Storstein, O; Stormorken, H; Efskind, L (July 1977). "Prevention of arterial thromboembolism with acetylsalicylic acid. A controlled clinical study in patients with aortic ball valves". American Heart Journal. 94 (1): 101–11. doi:10.1016/S0002-8703(77)80351-7. PMID 326013.
- Erikssen, J; Thaulow, E; Stormorken, H; Brendemoen, O; Hellem, A (18 June 1980). "ABO blood groups and coronary heart disease (CHD). A study in subjects with severe and latent CHD". Thrombosis and Haemostasis. 43 (2): 137–40. doi:10.1055/s-0038-1650035. PMID 7455973.
- Stormorken, H; Bjørnerud, B; Chye, NE (1 October 1982). "A new constellation: females with concomitant von Willebrand's disease and carriership for factor VIII". Thrombosis Research. 28 (1): 133–6. doi:10.1016/0049-3848(82)90041-X. PMID 6818709.
- Thaulow, E; Erikssen, J; Myhre, E; Stormorken, H; Hellem, A (April 1982). "Platelet function related to the development and presenting symptoms in coronary artery disease. An epidemiological study in apparently healthy men". Scandinavian Journal of Haematology. 28 (4): 281–8. doi:10.1111/j.1600-0609.1982.tb00528.x. PMID 7112029.
- Stormorken, H; Brosstad, F; Seim, H (28 April 1983). "A new dysfibrinogenemia: fibrinogen Oslo IV". Thrombosis and Haemostasis. 49 (2): 120–2. doi:10.1055/s-0038-1657335. PMID 6868008.
- Gogstad, GO; Stormorken, H; Solum, NO (15 July 1983). "Platelet alpha 2-antiplasmin is located in the platelet alpha-granules". Thrombosis Research. 31 (2): 387–90. doi:10.1016/0049-3848(83)90339-0. PMID 6636049.
- Stormorken, H; Gogstad, GO; Brosstad, F (August 1983). "Hereditary α2-antiplasmin deficiency". Thrombosis Research. 31 (4): 647–651. doi:10.1016/0049-3848(83)90462-0.
- Brosstad F, Teige B, Olaisen B, Gravem K, Godal HC & Stormorken H. Two-dimensional electrophoretic characterization (ISO-DALT) of fibrinogen and fibrin subunit chains from four different genetic dysfibrinogen variants. In: Fibrinogen-Structure. Eds. Haverkate et al., de Gruyter & Co, Berlin NB Årstall
- Stormorken, H; Gogstad, G; Solum, NO (15 February 1983). "A new bleeding disorder: lack of platelet aggregatory response to adrenaline and lack of secondary aggregation to ADP and platelet activating factor (PAF)". Thrombosis Research. 29 (4): 391–402. doi:10.1016/0049-3848(83)90242-6. PMID 6857589.
- Stormorken, H; Erikssen, J. (1984). "xF VIII levels and blood group antigens". Thromb. Haemost. 51: 292. doi:10.1055/s-0038-1661080.
- Ørstavik, KH; Stormorken, H; Sparr, T (March 1985). "Hemophilia B_{M} in a female". Thrombosis Research. 37 (5): 561–566. doi:10.1016/0049-3848(85)90088-X. PMID 3983911.
- Stormorken, H; Sjaastad, O; Langslet, A; Sulg, I; Egge, K; Diderichsen, J (November 1985). "A new syndrome: thrombocytopathia, muscle fatigue, asplenia, miosis, migraine, dyslexia and ichthyosis". Clinical Genetics. 28 (5): 367–74. doi:10.1111/j.1399-0004.1985.tb02209.x. PMID 4085141.
- Thorsen, LI; Brosstad, F; Solum, NO; Stormorken, H (February 1986). "Increased binding to ADP-stimulated platelets and aggregation effect of the dysfibrinogen Oslo I as compared with normal fibrinogen". Scandinavian Journal of Haematology. 36 (2): 203–10. doi:10.1111/j.1600-0609.1986.tb00829.x. PMID 3010440.
- Stormorken, H; Gjemdal, T; Bjøro, K (1988). "Lupus anticoagulant: a unique case with lupus anticoagulant and habitual abortion together with antifactor II antibody and bleeding tendency". Gynecologic and Obstetric Investigation. 26 (1): 83–8. doi:10.1159/000293678. PMID 3139508.
- Stormorken, H; Hessel, B; Lunde, J; Brun Holmsen, I (October 1986). "Severe factor viii deficiency in a chromosomally normal female". Thrombosis Research. 44 (1): 113–117. doi:10.1016/0049-3848(86)90186-6. PMID 3097867.
- Schwartz, M.; Mibashan, R.S.; Nicolaides, K.H.; Millar, D.S.; Jenkins, E.; Rodeck, C.H.; rstavik, KarenHelene; Stormorken, H. (December 1989). "First-trimester diagnosis of Wiskott-Aldrich syndrome by DNA markers". The Lancet. 334 (8676): 1405. doi:10.1016/S0140-6736(89)92026-6. PMID 2574357.
- Stormorken, H; Hellum, B; Nakstad, B; Thorsrud, AK; Jellum, E (1 October 1990). "Polymorphism of a platelet polypeptide". Thrombosis Research. 60 (1): 71–7. doi:10.1016/0049-3848(90)90341-9. PMID 2278037.
- Sjaastad, OV; Blom, AK; Stormorken, H; Nes, N (March 1990). "Adenine nucleotides, serotonin, and aggregation properties of platelets of blue foxes (Alopex lagopus) with the Chediak-Higashi syndrome". American Journal of Medical Genetics. 35 (3): 373–8. doi:10.1002/ajmg.1320350312. PMID 2309785.
- Stormorken, H; Briseid, K; Hellum, B; Hoem, NO; Johansen, HT; Ly, B (15 December 1990). "A new case of total kininogen deficiency". Thrombosis Research. 60 (6): 457–67. doi:10.1016/0049-3848(90)90230-a. PMID 2127962.
- Thaulow, E; Erikssen, J; Sandvik, L; Stormorken, H; Cohn, PF (August 1991). "Blood platelet count and function are related to total and cardiovascular death in apparently healthy men". Circulation. 84 (2): 613–7. doi:10.1161/01.CIR.84.2.613. PMID 1860204.
- Pande, Helens; Chester, Alan; Lia, Halldis; Tharsby, Erik; Stormorken, Helge (28 June 2008). "Concomitant occurrence of mucopolysaccharidosis IIIB and Glanzmann's thrombasthenia. Further evidence of a hyperactive ?-N-acetylglucosaminidase-producing allele". Clinical Genetics. 41 (5): 243–247. doi:10.1111/j.1399-0004.1992.tb03674.x. PMID 1606713.
- Barstad, RM; Stormorken, H; Orning, L; Stephens, RW; Petersen, LB; Kierulf, P; Sakariassen, KS (15 November 1994). "Reduced thrombus formation in native blood of homozygous factor VII-deficient patients at high arterial wall shear rate". Blood. 84 (10): 3371–7. doi:10.1182/blood.V84.10.3371.3371. PMID 7949091.
- Schwartz, M; Békássy, A; Donnér, M; Hertel, T; Hreidarson, S; Kerndrup, G; Stormorken, H; Stokland, T; Tranebjaerg, L; Orstavik, KH; Skovby, F (April 1996). "Mutation spectrum in patients with Wiskott-Aldrich syndrome and X-linked thrombocytopenia: identification of twelve different mutations in the WASP gene". Thrombosis and Haemostasis. 75 (4): 546–50. doi:10.1055/s-0038-1650318. PMID 8743175.
- Stephens, Ross W.; Örning, Lars; Stormorken, Helge; Hamers, Maria J.A.G.; Petersen, Lizette Balle; Sakariassen, Kjell S. (December 1996). "Characterisation of cell-surface procoagulant activities using a microcarrier model". Thrombosis Research. 84 (6): 453–461. doi:10.1016/S0049-3848(96)00213-7. PMID 8987166.
- Brennan, SO; Ridgway, H; Stormorken, H; Brosstad, F; George, PM (May 1997). "Characterisation of Fibrinogen Oslo IV by electrospray mass spectrometry". Thrombosis and Haemostasis. 77 (5): 1040–1. doi:10.1055/s-0038-1656104. PMID 9184429.
- Kavlie, A; Örning, L; Grindflek, A; Stormorken, H; Prydz, H (1998). "Characterization of a factor VII molecule carrying a mutation in the second epidermal growth factor-like domain". Thrombosis and Haemostasis. 79 (6): 1136–1143. doi:10.1055/s-0037-1615030. PMID 9657438.
- Erikssen, G; Liestøl, K; Bjørnholt, JV; Stormorken, H; Thaulow, E; Erikssen, J (1 October 2000). "Erythrocyte sedimentation rate: a possible marker of atherosclerosis and a strong predictor of coronary heart disease mortality". European Heart Journal. 21 (19): 1614–1620. doi:10.1053/euhj.2000.2148. PMID 10988014.
