= Alf Frotjold =

Norwegian trade unionist (1929-2001)

Alf Frotjold (1929 – 28 March 2001) was a Norwegian trade unionist and leader of the Arbeidernes Opplysningsforbund.

He was born in Bergen, and after working at sea he learned his trade as a chef. After finishing training in 1949 he worked as a chef in Notodden and Gjøvik, and soon chaired his local trade union. In 1955 he was hired as a secretary in the Hotel and Restaurant Workers Union in Norway, and he advanced until becoming deputy chairman. In 1970 he was hired in Arbeidernes Opplysningsforbund (AOF), an organization he led from 1975. From 1990 to 1994 he was the chairman of the board of the Labour Movement Archive and Library.

Publications include Oslo servitørforenings 75 års historie in 1966. He has also edited the union magazine Hotell- og Restaurantarbeideren. As leader of AOF he arranged many small festivals called "Workers' Days"; it was after such a festival in 1978 that the planning of the Norwegian Industrial Workers Museum started.
