= Ragnar Rygel =

Norwegian ice hockey player (1930–1999)

Personal information
- Born: 25 May 1930 Asker, Norway
- Died: 13 September 1999 (aged 69)

Sport
- Sport: Ice hockey

Ragnar Emil Rygel (25 May 1930 – 13 September 1999) was a Norwegian ice hockey player, born in Asker, Norway. He played for the Norwegian national ice hockey team, and participated at the Winter Olympics in 1952, where the Norwegian team placed 9th.

He also played football, and made two appearances for the Norway national team in 1954.
