= Jens Christian Magnus =

Norwegian military officer and politician (1920–2017)

- Born: 13 July 1920; Kristiania, Norway
- Died: 9 January 2017 (aged 96); Bærum
- Occupations: Military officer Politician

Jens Christian Magnus (13 July 1920 – 9 January 2017) was a Norwegian military officer and politician for the Conservative Party.

He was born in Kristiania and finished his secondary education at Ris in 1939. During the German occupation of Norway he took actively part in resistance activities of Milorg D13, the district that included Oslo Municipality, Bærum Municipality and Asker Municipality. He graduated with the cand.jur. degree in 1946. He later pursued a military career, and was promoted to Lieutenant in 1947, Captain in 1948, Major in 1951, Colonel in 1968 and Brigadier in 1975. As a politician he was elected to the municipal council for Bodin Municipality from 1964 to 1968, and in Bærum from 1973 to 1978. He resided in Høvik. He died on 9 January 2017 at the age of 96.
