= Maksim Guttormsen Råskhof =

Norwegian politician

Maksim Guttormsen Råskhof (born 24 December 1999) is a Norwegian politician for the Centre Party.

He hails from Tana. He served as a deputy representative to the Parliament of Norway from Finnmark during the term 2021–2025. In total he met during 18 days of parliamentary session.

In 2025, he headed the Centre Party ballot in the Eastern Consticuency for the Sámi parliamentary election. The Centre Party did not win any seats in that election.
