= Else Granheim =

Norwegian librarian (1926–1999)

- Granheim in an unknown date
- Born: 16 March 1926; Oslo, Norway
- Died: 7 March 1999 (aged 72); Asker
- Occupations: Librarian and civil servant
- Awards: Order of St. Olav (1989)

Else Granheim (16 March 1926 – 7 March 1999) was a Norwegian librarian and civil servant.

A librarian and eventually director of Statens bibliotektilsyn, she was also involved in legislative work and public commissions, edited library magazines, and served as president of the International Federation of Library Associations and Institutions.

== Early and personal life ==
Granheim was born on 16 March 1926 in Oslo to farmer Torstein Brevig and Ingeborg Hauge. After first living with her family in Enebakk, when her parents divorced, she moved with her mother to Trondheim when she was four years old. She married Harald Granheim in 1952.

== Career ==
After graduating in artium in 1944 and a one-year student course at the business high school in Trondheim, she started as an intern at Trondheim Public Library and then studied at the State Library School in Oslo. Granheim graduated as librarian in 1949, and was assigned as librarian at Statens bibliotektilsyn from 1950. Having held various positions at the institution, she was appointed as director from 1973 to 1991. She was widely engaged as board member and commission member within the library sector. This included legislative work, first as secreatary for the commission preparing the Library Act of 1971. She was also involved in preparing the Public library Act of 1985 (Lov om folkebibliotek). From 1979 she served as president for the International Federation of Library Associations and Institutions, and she was the first female president for this federation.

She was co-editor of Scandinavian Public Library Quarterly from 1968 to 1973, and edited the library magazine Bok og Bibliotek from 1970 to 1985.

In 1989 she was decorated Knight, First Class of the Order of St. Olav.

Granheim died in Asker on 7 March 1999.
