= Siri Lehland =

Norwegian model (born 2001)

- Born: Siri Pajuniemi Lehland; 12 February 2001 (age 25); Kristiansand, Norway
- Modeling information
- Height: 1.80 m (5 ft 11 in)
- Hair color: Blonde
- Eye color: Blue
- Agency: Monster Management (Milan); Oui Management (Paris); Elite Model Management (New York)
- Website: www.monster-mgmt.com/model/7249/siri-lehland

Siri Lehland (born 12 February 2001) is a Norwegian model. She was featured on the front cover of Elle in August 2018. She has modeled for various agencies including Monster Management in Milan, Oui Management in Paris, and Elite Model Management in New York City.

She was first discovered by agent Donna Ionna at age twelve. Ioanna has previously been the finding agent of models such as Siri Tollerød, Frida Aasen, Julia Rudby, and Maria Zachariassen.

Her interest for modeling began at age ten, when Lehland met model Siri Tollerød, also from Kristiansand, on a family vacation in New York. Discovered by model agent Donna Ioanna at age 12, she traveled to Italy to work for Monster Management in Milan at age 14. She was described as an emerging Norwegian supermodel by NRK in 2018.
