= Anne Valen Hestetun =

Norwegian politician

Anne Valen Hestetun (26 October 1920 – 30 December 2009) was a Norwegian politician for the Liberal Party and the Liberal People's Party.

She served as a deputy representative to the Parliament of Norway from Telemark during the terms 1961–1965 and 1969–1973. In total she met during 33 days of parliamentary session. In 1973, she stood for election for the Liberal People's Party, as third candidate on the ballot behind Sigurd Kalheim and Johan Trondsen.
