= Otto Nes =

Norwegian media executive

- Born: 9 April 1920; Solum, Norway
- Died: 4 July 2014 (aged 94)
- Occupation: broadcasting personality

Otto Albert Nes (9 April 1920 – 4 July 2014) was a Norwegian broadcasting personality. He was born in Solum Municipality, Norway. He served as program director at the Norwegian Broadcasting Corporation from 1963 to 1987. He was a central person in the development of television in Norway.
