= Beheim Karlsen case =

1999 death and criminal case in Norway

The Beheim Karlsen case concerns the 1999 death of Arve Beheim Karlsen, a 17-year-old Norwegian of Indian origin, and the subsequent criminal proceedings in Norway. Karlsen had been subjected to bullying, violence and racism over time. On the evening of 23 April 1999, he was chased in Sogndal by two young men who shouted racially motivated threats after him; he was found dead in the Sogndalselvi river on 26 April 1999.

The case became part of public debate in Norway about racism, bullying and the scope of the country's anti-racism legislation. In 2001, two men were convicted of violence and threats against Karlsen, but were acquitted of violating the anti-racism provision of the penal code.

== Background ==
Arve Beheim Karlsen was an Indian-born Norwegian teenager living in western Norway. According to Sogndal municipality, he had been subjected over time to bullying, violence and racism before the events of April 1999.

== Death ==
Late on 23 April 1999, Karlsen was chased by two young men in Sogndal while racially motivated threats were shouted after him. He was found dead in the Sogndalselvi river on the morning of 26 April 1999.

The circumstances of the case led to national attention in Norway, particularly because of the racial harassment reported before and during the incident.

== Criminal case ==
Two 19-year-old men were later tried in Indre Sogn District Court. They were acquitted of violating the anti-racism provision of the Norwegian Penal Code, then known as section 135a, but were convicted of violence and threats against Karlsen. One of the defendants was sentenced to three years in prison, while the other was sentenced to one year, part of it suspended.

The court held that some of the violence and threats were racially motivated, but the defendants were nevertheless acquitted under the specific anti-racism provision. Contemporary reporting explained that the provision concerned racist statements spread publicly, and the court did not find that this legal requirement had been met.

The verdict was criticised by anti-racist voices and by Karlsen's family, who argued that the legal protection against racist harassment was too weak in practice.

== Memorial ==
In 2024, 25 years after Karlsen's death, a memorial to him was unveiled at Granden by the Sogndalselvi in Sogndal. The unveiling took place on 28 April 2024 and was attended by Norway's Minister of Culture and Equality, Lubna Jaffery.

The memorial consists of a sculpture by artist Tobbe Malm and a poem by writer Brynjulf Jung Tjønn. During the unveiling, Jaffery described the memorial as a reminder of the need to learn from history and continue the work against racism and discrimination.

== Legacy ==
The Beheim Karlsen case is remembered in Norway as a case connected to racism, bullying and the limits of legal protection against racist harassment. In connection with the 2024 memorial, Sogndal municipality and Høgskulen på Vestlandet described the event as an important public act of remembrance and anti-racist reflection.

== See also ==
- Racism in Norway
- Death of Benjamin Hermansen
