= Reidun Andersson =

Norwegian politician

Reidun Andersson (26 June 1922 – 25 January 1992) was a Norwegian politician for the Socialist Left Party.

She served as a deputy representative to the Norwegian Parliament from Nordland during the terms 1981–1985.
