= Rudolf Næss =

Norwegian illustrator (1914–2003)

Rudolf Næss (23 August 1914 – 12 July 2003) was a Norwegian illustrator known for his "NN under SS" collection of water color illustrations, detailing various aspects of life as a Nacht und Nebel prisoner at Natzweiler-Struthof concentration camp during World War II. The collection of images is part of Norwegian legacy documents, established to preserve and highlight unique and irreplaceable documents. The register is also part of the UNESCO World Heritage List, and is owned and kept by the Norwegian National Library. The images were also featured in the Night and Fog Prisoners exhibition at Arkivet Peace and Human Rights Center, an education and documentation center in Kristiansand.

== Biography ==
Rudolf was born in Kristiania, but moved to Bergen, Norway at age 14. He worked as an illustrator, at times in the advertising industry. At age 29, he was arrested and imprisoned during the German occupation of Norway.

Næss was arrested on 25 June 1942 and imprisoned at Veiten. After an unknown period in Ulven he was moved to Grini on 19 August 1943. On 30 September he was sent to Germany, first to Natzweiler. As the Allies invaded Europe, Næss and other Natzweiler prisoners were sent to Dachau, Ottobrünn and Dautmergen. On 1 November 1944 he was back in Dachau concentration camp, where he remained until the camp was liberated. In 1945, he was rescued by the White Buses, a Swedish Red Cross Operation. Back home, Næss obtained photographs and details about the camps, and combined this information with his own memories to produce an album of 39 watercolor images over the course of two years. This visual testimony detailing aspects of life as an NN prisoner is unique in how his experiences were not translated into words. Upon completion in 1947, Næss gave the pictures to the University Library of Oslo.

He died in Bergen at the age of 88.
