= Wilhelm Aarek =

Norwegian philologist and educationalist (1907–1999)

- Born: 17 April 1907
- Died: 26 December 1999 (aged 92)
- Occupation: Lecturer in English language at Kristiansand Teacher's College.

Wilhelm Aarek (17 April 1907 – 26 December 1999) was a Norwegian philologist and educationalist.

He was a cand.philol. by education, and was appointed as a lecturer in English language at Kristiansand Teacher's College in 1938. He had also applied for a job at Stavanger Cathedral School, but was rejected by the government. At Kristiansand Teacher's College he soon began writing books about pedagogy as well as his original field of philology. He served rector of the college from 1948 to 1976. He was decorated with the Royal Norwegian Order of St. Olav, and died in 1999.

Academic offices
Preceded by Håkon Wergeland	Rector of Kristiansand Teacher's College; 1948–1976	Succeeded by Jan Fjelde
