= Alexander Pihl =

Norwegian medical scientist

- Born: 1 June 1920; Kristiania, Norway
- Died: 24 November 2009 (aged 89)
- Occupation: Medical doctor

Alexander Abraham Pihl (1 June 1920 – 24 November 2009) was a Norwegian physician and professor of medicine.

== Biography ==
Phil was born in Kristiania, and completed his examen artium at Oslo Cathedral School in 1939. He was appointed professor at the University of Oslo from 1963 to 1990. His research areas included biochemistry, cancer therapy and radiation biology. He was decorated Knight of the Order of St. Olav in 1989. He was a fellow of the Norwegian Academy of Science and Letters from 1969.

Pihl died on 24 November 2009.
