= Viking Olver Eriksen =

Norwegian nuclear physicist (1922–2014)

Viking Olver Eriksen (14 April 1922 – 6 March 2014) was a Norwegian nuclear physicist.

He was born in Stavanger, and graduated as cand.real. in 1951. In 1952 he was hired at the Institute for Nuclear Energy at Kjeller—the institution is now named the Norwegian Institute for Energy Technology—as head of the physics department. He left this position in 1965 to become assisting director. In 1968 he was managing director for a brief time, from 1971 to 1982 he held this position on a permanent basis.

He died in Lillestrøm in March 2014 at the age of 91.
