= Harald Magne Elstad =

Norwegian judge

Harald Magne Elstad (13 March 1913 – 2003) was a Norwegian judge.

He was born in Kristiania. He took his examen artium in 1932 and graduated from university with the cand.jur. degree in 1936. He started his career as a deputy judge in Rakkestad District Court, and was a junior solicitor in Mysen before being hired in the Norwegian Price Directorate. He remained there for fifteen years.

He then worked as a judge in the Oslo City Court from 1954, as presiding judge in Hålogaland from 1967 and as Supreme Court Justice from 1973 to his retirement 1983. He died at the age of 90 in 2003.
