= Audun Hetland =

Norwegian illustrator

- Born: 12 April 1920; Bergen, Norway
- Died: 8 January 1998 (aged 77)
- Occupation: Illustrator

Audun Hetland (12 April 1920 – 8 January 1998) was a Norwegian illustrator. He was born in Bergen, and studied at the Bergen National Academy of the Arts from 1935 to 1938. He worked as freelance illustrator for the newspaper Bergens Aftenblad from 1940 to 1942. After the Second World War he worked for Morgenavisen, and eventually for Aftenposten, Bergens Tidende and Bergensavisen. Among his books are six best-selling political satires in cooperation with Jon Leirfall from 1970 to 1975, Kampen for tilværelsen from 1982, and the 13-volume book series Norske smil with Herbjørn Sørebø.

Several of his artworks are located at Hilmar Reksten's collections at Fjøsanger, and he is represented at the National Gallery of Norway and Bergen Museum. He died in Oslo in 1998.
