= Johan Trondsen =

Norwegian politician (1922–2018)

Johan Trondsen (26 July 1922 – 4 March 2018) was a Norwegian politician for the Liberal Party and the Liberal People's Party.

He served as a deputy representative to the Parliament of Norway from Telemark during the term 1961–1965. In total he met during 10 days of parliamentary session. In 1973 he stood for election for the Liberal People's Party, as second candidate behind Sigurd Kalheim.

He was a bailiff in Nissedal Municipality. From 1985 to 1992 he was a board member of the Norwegian Police Academy.
