= Per Hohle =

Norwegian writer

- Born: 5 December 1918; Østre Toten, Norway
- Died: 24 November 1999 (aged 80)
- Occupation: Writer

Per Hohle (5 December 1918 – 24 November 1999) was a Norwegian writer.

He was born in Østre Toten Municipality. He wrote numerous books on hunting, mountaineering, nature and the outdoors. Notable books are Trollelgen i Svefjellet (1970), Fra varde til varde (1971), Folk og skrømt i Vassfaret (1973), Finnskoger og skogfinner (1974), I bjørnemark og villfjell (1976), De møtte bjørnen (1977), Høyfjell og villmark (1987), Storviltjegere og storviltjakter (1990) and Gjeddekongen i Siksjølia (1993).
