= Dagmar Lahlum =

Norwegian resistance member

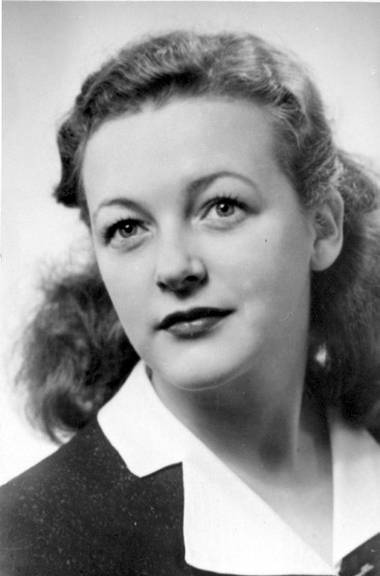
- Lahlum in an undated photo
- Born: 10 March 1923; Eidsvoll, Norway
- Died: 28 December 1999 (aged 76)
- Espionage activity
- Allegiance: Norway
- Agency: MI5 (unofficial); Norwegian resistance movement
- Service years: at least 1943–1945

Dagmar Mohne Hansen Lahlum (10 March 1923, Norway – 28 December 1999) was a member of the Norwegian resistance in Oslo during World War II and was later recruited (unofficially) to work for MI5.

== Early life ==
The daughter of a shoemaker, Lahlum was born in Eidsvoll, but moved to Oslo when she was 17, shortly before the start of the war. Initially she worked as a receptionist in a city centre hotel and later took modeling classes.

== World War II ==
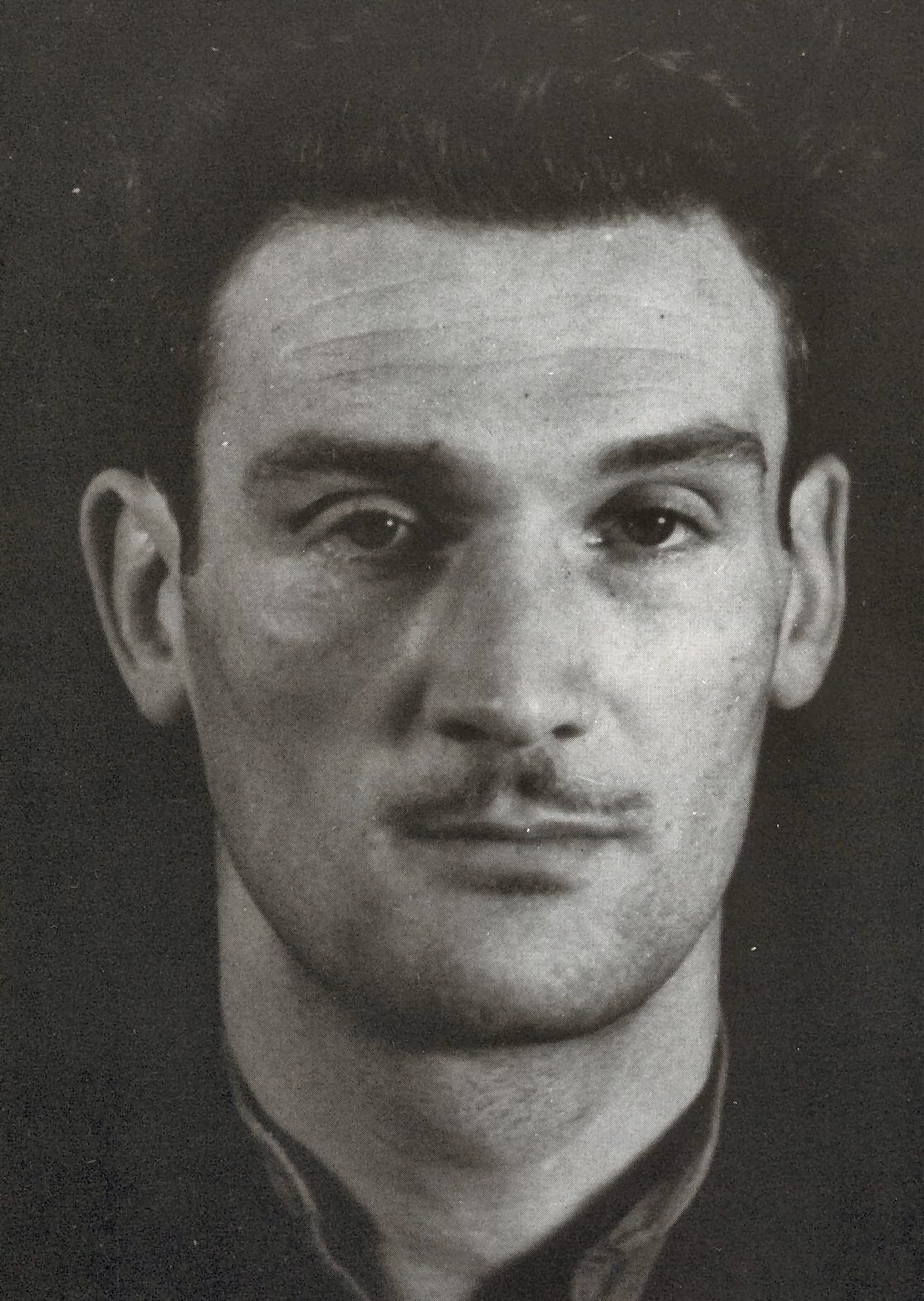
Eddie Chapman – British spy and Lahlum's lover

In April 1943, when British double agent Eddie Chapman was drinking with German officers in The Ritz bar at Skillebekk, which was also popular with members of the Norwegian national socialist party, his eye fell on the attractive Dagmar, who – complete with a décolletage and high heels – was smoking Craven A's with an ivory mouthpiece.

When he first chatted her up, he thought that she was either a prostitute or just another good time girl; whilst on the other hand Lahlum thought that he worked for the Germans, or was in fact a German – albeit one with an odd accent.

From 1943 onwards, she became his girlfriend and later his fiancée. Troubled by the fact that she was being labelled a German whore by the locals, Chapman compromised his security during a boating trip on the fjord, when they had shared a bottle of cognac over lunch. Here he told her that he was a British double agent, and that the Germans would soon be sending him on a new mission to England. Lahlum was much relieved to hear that he worked for the British and at the same time told him about her work with the Norwegian resistance movement.

When Chapman was sent back to England, Lahlum was looked after by the Germans at the insistence of Chapman, and she was even paid a monthly allowance of 600 NK from the money held to his order by them and administered by Chapman's handler Stephan von Gröning.

By the time he left for England, Chapman had unofficially recruited her to MI5, and together they surveyed the German defences in and around Oslo – facts that Chapman later detailed to his British handlers upon his return. One of the sites that they reported on was the home of the Norwegian leader and traitor Vidkun Quisling.

They lived together for a while in Oslo in a flat abandoned by a Jewish family killed by the Germans, and later a small town house at Kapellveien 15, also in Oslo. When Chapman returned to England, he used Lahlum's first name, Dagmar, as his security code in all of his radio transmissions as evidence that he was still a free agent.

Although they had talked about and partly planned to open a bar or club together in Paris after the war and about having children together, when the war actually ended Chapman abandoned Lahlum, who never got over their relationship. Lahlum was branded as a "German tart" for her relationship with Chapman, as the Norwegians were unaware he was an Englishman. She was arrested on 19 May 1945 and spent six months in a prison. Her promise to Chapman never to reveal his secret led to her pleading guilty during her treason trial in 1947, and being sentenced to six months in jail.

She eventually heard from Chapman in 1997, and visited him in England. She died around 28 December 1999, suffering from Parkinson's disease, alcoholism, and malnutrition.

== Sources ==
- Ben Macintyre, Agent Zigzag: The True Wartime Story of Eddie Chapman, Lover, Betrayer, Hero, Spy, Bloomsbury, London, 2007, (ISBN 0747587949)
- English-language article on Lahlum, livejournal.com; accessed 7 July 2017.
