= Namdalseid Municipality =

Former municipality in Trøndelag, Norway

Namdalseid Municipality Namdalseid kommune
- Former municipality
- Namdalseidet herred (historic name)
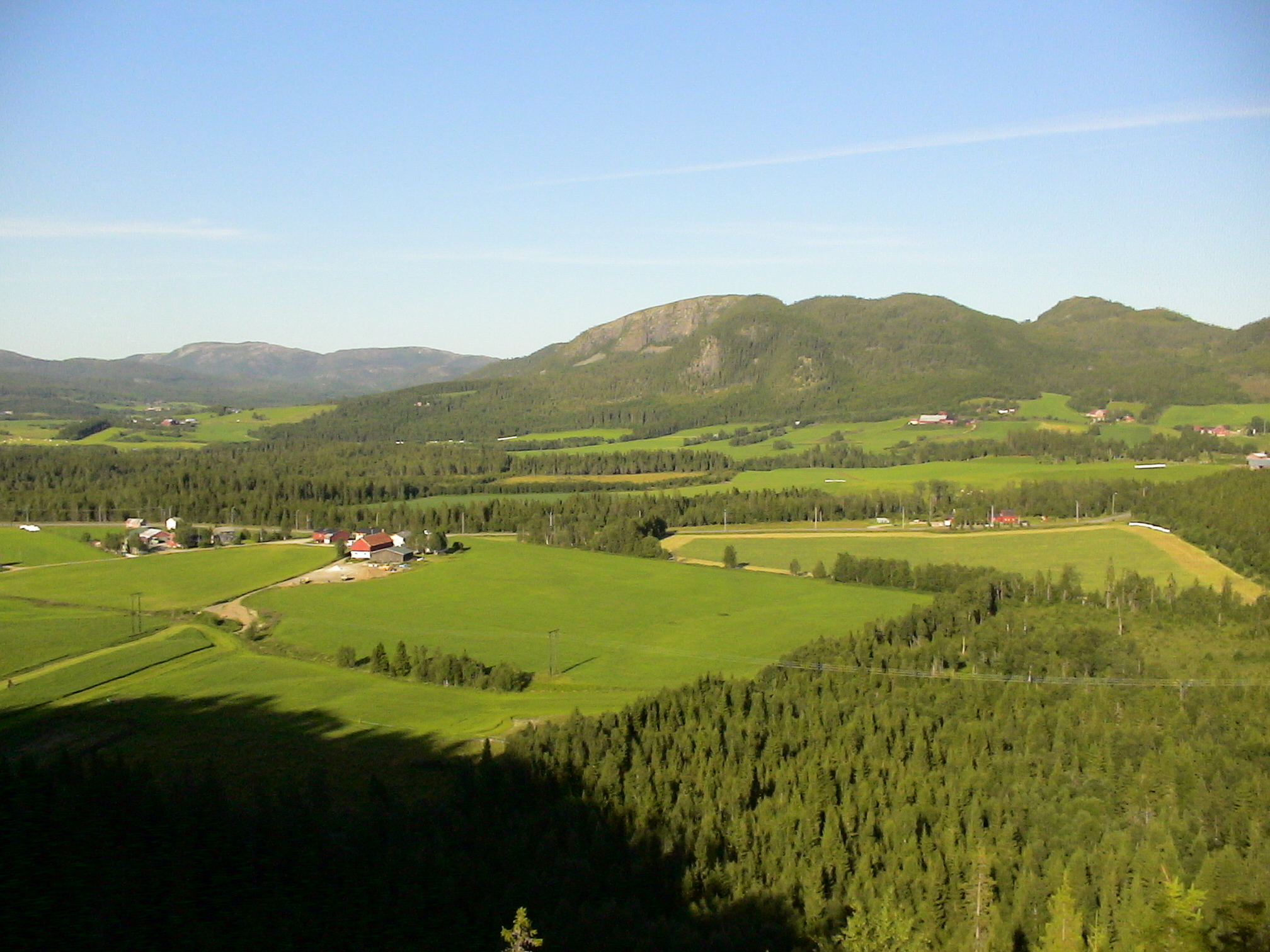
- View of the Namdalseid area

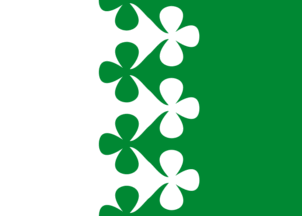
- Flag Coat of arms

- Trøndelag within Norway

- Namdalseid within Trøndelag
- Coordinates: 64°17′21″N 11°10′35″E
- Country: Norway
- County: Trøndelag
- District: Namdalen
- Established: 1 Jan 1838
  - Created as: Formannskapsdistrikt
- Disestablished: 1 Jan 1846
  - Succeeded by: Beitstaden Municipality
- Re-established: 1 Jan 1904
  - Preceded by: Beitstaden Municipality
- Disestablished: 1 Jan 2020
  - Succeeded by: Namsos Municipality
- Administrative centre: Namdalseid

Government
  - Mayor (2003-2019): Steinar Lyngstad (Sp)

Area (upon dissolution)
  - Total: 769.63 km^{2} (297.16 sq mi)
  - Land: 734.68 km^{2} (283.66 sq mi)
  - Water: 34.95 km^{2} (13.49 sq mi) 4.5%
  - Rank: #144 in Norway
- Highest elevation: 686 m (2,251 ft)

Population (2019)
  - Total: 1,576
  - Rank: #348 in Norway
  - Density: 2/km^{2} (5.2/sq mi)
  - Change (10 years): ▼ −8.4%
- Demonym: Eibygg

Official language
  - Norwegian form: Neutral
- Time zone: UTC+01:00 (CET)
  - Summer (DST): UTC+02:00 (CEST)
- ISO 3166 code: NO-5040

Namdalseid is a former municipality in Trøndelag county, Norway. The municipality existed from 1838 to 1846 and then again from 1904 until its dissolution in 2020 when it joined Namsos Municipality. It was part of the Namdalen region. The administrative centre of the municipality was the village of Namdalseid. Other villages and farm areas in the municipality included Sjøåsen, Statland, Tøttdalen, and Sverkmoen.

At the time of its dissolution in 2020, the 770-square-kilometre (300 sq mi) municipality was the 144th largest by area out of the 422 municipalities in Norway. Namdalseid Municipality was the 348th most populous municipality in Norway with a population of 1,576. The municipality's population density was 2.2 inhabitants per square kilometre (5.7/sq mi) and its population had decreased by 8.4% over the previous decade.

== General information ==
The parish of Namdalseid was established as a municipality on 1 January 1838 (see formannskapsdistrikt law), but it was short-lived. On 1 January 1846, it was merged into the neighboring Beitstad Municipality. On 1 January 1904, the Namdalseid district (population: 1,368) was separated from Beitstad Municipality to form a municipality of its own (once again). During the 1960s, there were many municipal mergers across Norway due to the work of the Schei Committee. On 1 January 1964, the parts of the neighboring Otterøy Municipality that were located south of the Namsenfjorden (population: 571) were transferred to Namdalseid Municipality.

On 1 January 2018, the municipality switched from the old Nord-Trøndelag county to the new Trøndelag county. On 1 January 2020, the neighboring Fosnes Municipality, Namsos Municipality, and Namdalseid Municipality were merged to form a new, larger Namsos Municipality. This occurred because on 16 June 2016, the three municipalities voted to merge as part of a large municipal reform across Norway.

=== Name ===
The municipality (originally the parish) is named Namdalseid. This name originally comes from the old Elda farm (Old Norse: Eldueið or commonly shortened to Eið) since the first Eid Stave Church was built there. The first element is eldu which is the name of the local river. The last element is eið which means "path/road between two waters" (here the Beitstadfjorden and Namsenfjorden)". The Vikings used to drag boats across Namdalseid using the rivers and waterways in the area, to get from one fjord to another without having to risk crossing the treacherous Folda fjord by travelling up the sheltered Trondheimsfjord and continuing north along the coast. The passage was much easier in olden times as the sea level was higher and the waterways more numerous, but as recently as 2004 a boatdrag was done to commemorate the old traditions. Nowadays, however, one has to transport the boats by road for a fairly long stretch. Around the year 1550, the prefix Namdals- was added to the name to distinguish it from other places using the common name Eid. The prefix is the genitive case of the old region name Namdalen. Historically, the name of the municipality was spelled Namdalseidet. On 3 November 1917, a royal resolution changed the spelling of the name of the municipality to Namdalseid, removing the definite form ending -et.

=== Coat of arms ===
The coat of arms was granted on 8 December 1989 and they were in use until 1 January 2020 when the municipality was dissolved. The official blazon is "Per pale trefly-counter-trefly argent and vert" (Norwegian: Kløvd av sølv og grønt ved kløverbladsnitt). This means the arms have a field (background) that is divided vertically by a line that follows a trefoil/clover design that alternates on either side of the line. The background on the left side of the line has a tincture of argent which means it is commonly colored white, but if it is made out of metal, then silver is used. The background on the right side has a tincture of green. The clover leaf shapes and the colors were chosen to symbolize the agriculture, landscapes, and nature within the municipality. Namdalseid was a farming municipality with mainly grass production. The municipal flag has the same design as the coat of arms.

=== Churches ===
The Church of Norway had two parishes (sokn) within Namdalseid Municipality. It is part of the Nord-Innherad prosti (deanery) in the Diocese of Nidaros.

Churches in Namdalseid Municipality
Parish (sokn)	Church name	Location of the church	Year built
Namdalseid	Namdalseid Church	Namdalseid	1858
Statland	Statland Church	Statland	1992

== Geography ==
The municipality bordered Flatanger Municipality, Roan Municipality, and Osen Municipality to the west; Namsos Municipality to the north; Åfjord Municipality and Verran Municipality to the southwest; and Steinkjer Municipality to the southeast. Lakes in the region include Gilten and Finnvollvatnet. The river Sverka runs through the western part of the municipality. The Namsenfjorden formed most of the northern border. The highest point in the municipality was the 686-metre (2,251 ft) tall mountain Båeriesvaerie.

== Government ==
While it existed, Namdalseid Municipality was responsible for primary education (through 10th grade), outpatient health services, senior citizen services, welfare and other social services, zoning, economic development, and municipal roads and utilities. The municipality was governed by a municipal council of directly elected representatives. The mayor was indirectly elected by a vote of the municipal council. The municipality was under the jurisdiction of the Namdal District Court and the Frostating Court of Appeal.

Municipal waste management was since 1979 handled by the inter-municipal Midtre Namdal Avfallsselskap.

=== Municipal council ===
The municipal council (Herredsstyre) of Namdalseid Municipality was made up of 19 representatives that were elected to four year terms. The tables below show the historical composition of the council by political party.

Namdalseid kommunestyre 2015–2019
Party name (in Norwegian)	Number of representatives
Labour Party (Arbeiderpartiet)	4
Conservative Party (Høyre)	1
Christian Democratic Party (Kristelig Folkeparti)	1
Centre Party (Senterpartiet)	12
Liberal Party (Venstre)	1
Total number of members:	19
Note: On 1 January 2020, Namdsalseid Municipality became part of Namsos Municipality.

Namdalseid kommunestyre 2011–2015
Party name (in Norwegian)	Number of representatives
Labour Party (Arbeiderpartiet)	6
Conservative Party (Høyre)	1
Christian Democratic Party (Kristelig Folkeparti)	1
Centre Party (Senterpartiet)	10
Liberal Party (Venstre)	1
Total number of members:	19

Namdalseid kommunestyre 2007–2011
Party name (in Norwegian)	Number of representatives
Labour Party (Arbeiderpartiet)	6
Christian Democratic Party (Kristelig Folkeparti)	1
Centre Party (Senterpartiet)	10
Socialist Left Party (Sosialistisk Venstreparti)	1
Liberal Party (Venstre)	1
Total number of members:	19

Namdalseid kommunestyre 2003–2007
Party name (in Norwegian)	Number of representatives
Labour Party (Arbeiderpartiet)	6
Conservative Party (Høyre)	1
Christian Democratic Party (Kristelig Folkeparti)	1
Centre Party (Senterpartiet)	6
Socialist Left Party (Sosialistisk Venstreparti)	1
Liberal Party (Venstre)	2
Total number of members:	17

Namdalseid kommunestyre 1999–2003
Party name (in Norwegian)	Number of representatives
Labour Party (Arbeiderpartiet)	9
Conservative Party (Høyre)	2
Christian Democratic Party (Kristelig Folkeparti)	1
Centre Party (Senterpartiet)	7
Liberal Party (Venstre)	2
Total number of members:	21

Namdalseid kommunestyre 1995–1999
Party name (in Norwegian)	Number of representatives
Labour Party (Arbeiderpartiet)	8
Conservative Party (Høyre)	1
Christian Democratic Party (Kristelig Folkeparti)	1
Centre Party (Senterpartiet)	8
Socialist Left Party (Sosialistisk Venstreparti)	1
Liberal Party (Venstre)	2
Total number of members:	21

Namdalseid kommunestyre 1991–1995
Party name (in Norwegian)	Number of representatives
Labour Party (Arbeiderpartiet)	7
Conservative Party (Høyre)	1
Christian Democratic Party (Kristelig Folkeparti)	1
Centre Party (Senterpartiet)	8
Socialist Left Party (Sosialistisk Venstreparti)	2
Liberal Party (Venstre)	2
Total number of members:	21

Namdalseid kommunestyre 1987–1991
Party name (in Norwegian)	Number of representatives
Labour Party (Arbeiderpartiet)	9
Conservative Party (Høyre)	2
Christian Democratic Party (Kristelig Folkeparti)	1
Centre Party (Senterpartiet)	6
Liberal Party (Venstre)	3
Total number of members:	21

Namdalseid kommunestyre 1983–1987
Party name (in Norwegian)	Number of representatives
Labour Party (Arbeiderpartiet)	8
Conservative Party (Høyre)	2
Christian Democratic Party (Kristelig Folkeparti)	1
Centre Party (Senterpartiet)	7
Liberal Party (Venstre)	2
Local list for Namdalseid (Bygdeliste for Namdalseid)	1
Total number of members:	21

Namdalseid kommunestyre 1979–1983
Party name (in Norwegian)	Number of representatives
Labour Party (Arbeiderpartiet)	8
Conservative Party (Høyre)	2
Christian Democratic Party (Kristelig Folkeparti)	2
Centre Party (Senterpartiet)	7
Liberal Party (Venstre)	2
Total number of members:	21

Namdalseid kommunestyre 1975–1979
Party name (in Norwegian)	Number of representatives
Labour Party (Arbeiderpartiet)	7
Christian Democratic Party (Kristelig Folkeparti)	1
Centre Party (Senterpartiet)	9
Liberal Party (Venstre)	4
Total number of members:	21

Namdalseid kommunestyre 1971–1975
Party name (in Norwegian)	Number of representatives
Labour Party (Arbeiderpartiet)	8
Christian Democratic Party (Kristelig Folkeparti)	2
Centre Party (Senterpartiet)	8
Liberal Party (Venstre)	3
Total number of members:	21

Namdalseid kommunestyre 1967–1971
Party name (in Norwegian)	Number of representatives
Labour Party (Arbeiderpartiet)	8
Christian Democratic Party (Kristelig Folkeparti)	2
Centre Party (Senterpartiet)	8
Liberal Party (Venstre)	3
Total number of members:	21

Namdalseid kommunestyre 1963–1967
Party name (in Norwegian)	Number of representatives
Labour Party (Arbeiderpartiet)	8
Christian Democratic Party (Kristelig Folkeparti)	2
Centre Party (Senterpartiet)	7
Liberal Party (Venstre)	4
Total number of members:	21

Namdalseid herredsstyre 1959–1963
Party name (in Norwegian)	Number of representatives
Labour Party (Arbeiderpartiet)	3
Centre Party (Senterpartiet)	8
Liberal Party (Venstre)	4
Local List(s) (Lokale lister)	2
Total number of members:	17

Namdalseid herredsstyre 1955–1959
Party name (in Norwegian)	Number of representatives
Labour Party (Arbeiderpartiet)	4
Farmers' Party (Bondepartiet)	6
Liberal Party (Venstre)	3
Total number of members:	13

Namdalseid herredsstyre 1951–1955
Party name (in Norwegian)	Number of representatives
Labour Party (Arbeiderpartiet)	4
Farmers' Party (Bondepartiet)	5
Liberal Party (Venstre)	3
Total number of members:	12

Namdalseid herredsstyre 1947–1951
Party name (in Norwegian)	Number of representatives
Labour Party (Arbeiderpartiet)	4
Farmers' Party (Bondepartiet)	5
Liberal Party (Venstre)	3
Total number of members:	12

Namdalseid herredsstyre 1945–1947
Party name (in Norwegian)	Number of representatives
Labour Party (Arbeiderpartiet)	4
Farmers' Party (Bondepartiet)	5
Liberal Party (Venstre)	3
Total number of members:	12

Namdalseid herredsstyre 1937–1941*
Party name (in Norwegian)	Number of representatives
Labour Party (Arbeiderpartiet)	4
Farmers' Party (Bondepartiet)	5
Liberal Party (Venstre)	3
Total number of members:	12
Note: Due to the German occupation of Norway during World War II, no elections were held for new municipal councils until after the war ended in 1945.

=== Mayors ===
The mayor (Norwegian: ordfører) of Namdalseid Municipality was the political leader of the municipality and the chairperson of the municipal council. Here is a list of people who held this position:

- 1838–1839: Erich Helbostad
- 1840–1841: Christian Gotfred Vogelsang
- 1842–1845: Morten Elden
- (1846–1904: Namdalseid Municipality did not exist)
- 1904–1906: Paul Anzjøn
- 1907–1907: Kristoffer Elden
- 1908–1910: Henrik Elden
- 1911–1913: John Buvarp
- 1914–1916: Håkon Holien (V)
- 1917–1922: Tønnes Silset (V)
- 1923–1925: Sverre Elden (Bp)
- 1926–1931: Tønnes Silset (Bp)
- 1932–1934: Olav Sæther (V)
- 1935–1937: Tønnes Silset (Bp)
- 1938–1940: Edmund Buvarp (V)
- 1941–1941: Tønnes Silset (NS)
- 1942–1942: Kristian Anzjøn (NS)
- 1943–1943: Edvard Stamnes (NS)
- 1944–1945: Oldus Mork (NS)
- 1945–1946: Edmund Buvarp (V)
- 1947–1947: Eiliv Elden (Bp)
- 1948–1951: Trygve Silset (Bp)
- 1952–1959: Inge Kaldahl (Bp)
- 1960–1964: Asbjørn Kaldahl (Sp)
- 1964–1968: Otto Ekker (Sp)
- 1968–1972: Inge Kaldahl (Sp)
- 1972–1983: Einar Furre (Sp)
- 1984–1987: Per Arve Lie (V)
- 1988–1995: Bjørn Hagen (Ap)
- 1995–1999: Hetty Vårdal (Ap)
- 1999–2003: Per Arve Lie (V)
- 2003–2019: Steinar Lyngstad (Sp)

== Economy ==
Being mainly an agricultural municipality, Namdalseid struggled with a decline in population, as fewer and fewer people find they can make a living growing crops and raising cattle. Other areas of interest for business were fishing, hunting, and nature. Having one of the best small-salmon (grisle) rivers in Trøndelag, Namdalseid is a haven for fly fishing and attracts many fishermen every year. In addition to fishing many visit Namdalseid to experience the beautiful mountain scenery and to do some hunting.

Namdalseid also had some industry. Hundseth Mølle is one of the largest mills in Norway, Namdal Plast AS is a factory manufacturing fiberglass products, and Pelsberederiet AS is a manufacturer of furs from moose, deer, and other wild animals.

== See also ==
- List of former municipalities of Norway
