= Otterøya (disambiguation) =

Otterøya or Otterøy may refer to:

== Places ==
- Otterøya, an island in Namsos Municipality in Trøndelag county, Norway
- Otterøy Municipality, a former municipality in northern Trøndelag county, Norway
- Otterøy Church, a church in Namsos Municipality in Trøndelag county, Norway
- Otterøya (Vestland), an unpopulated island in Bømlo Municipality in Vestland county, Norway
- Von Otterøya, an island in Hinlopen Strait between Spitsbergen and Nordaustlandet in Svalbard
- Otterøya or Otrøya, an island in Molde Municipality in Møre og Romsdal county, Norway
- Otterøya (Sveio), an island in Sveio Municipality in Vestland county, Norway
