= Otterøy Municipality =

Former municipality in Trøndelag, Norway

Otterøy Municipality Otterøy herred
- Former municipality
- Otterøen herred (historic name)
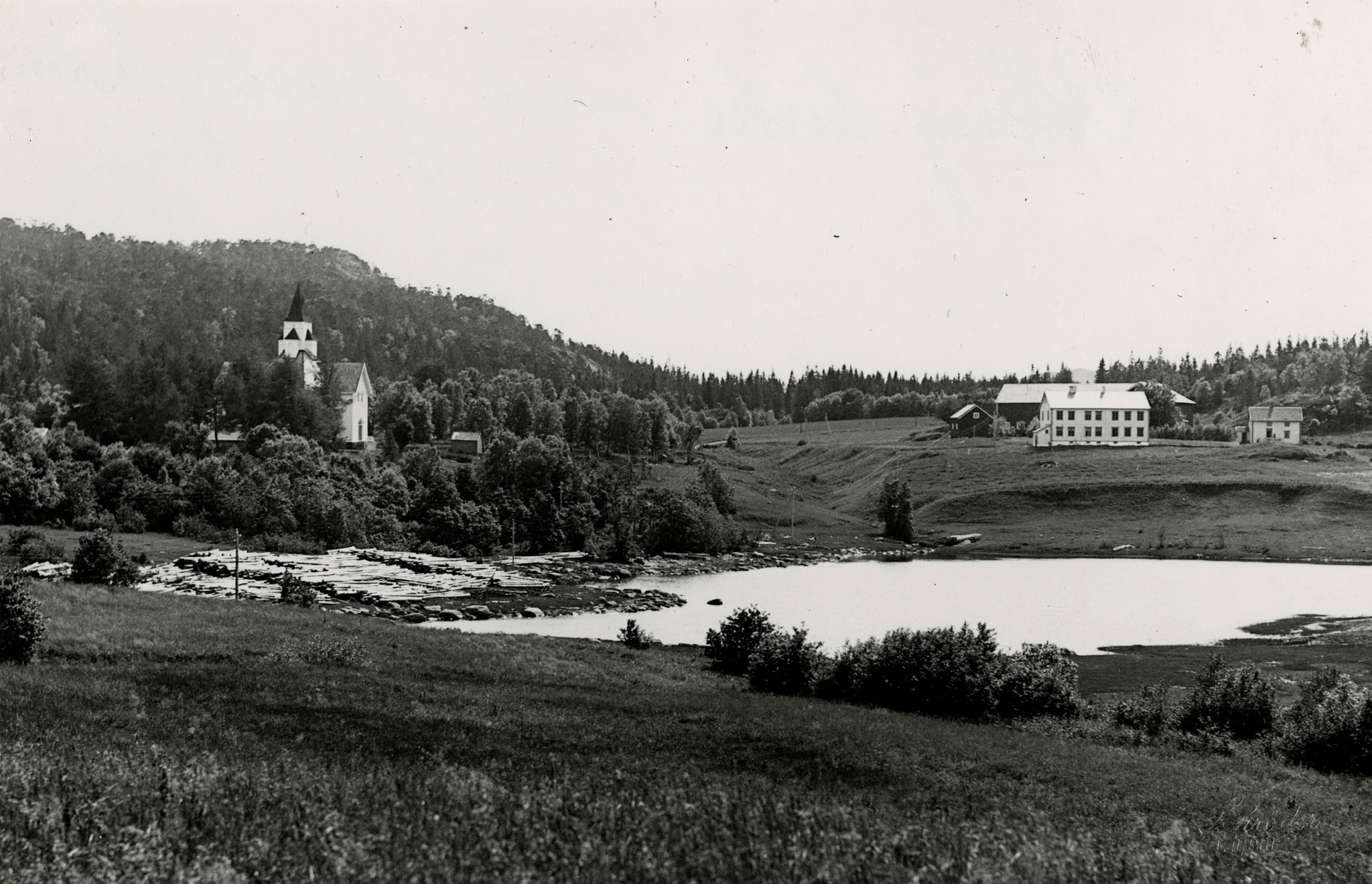
- View of the Otterøy Church area on the island of Otterøya

- Nord-Trøndelag within Norway

- Otterøy within Nord-Trøndelag
- Coordinates: 64°30′39″N 11°17′52″E
- Country: Norway
- County: Nord-Trøndelag
- District: Namdalen
- Established: 1 Jan 1913
  - Preceded by: Fosnes Municipality
- Disestablished: 1 Jan 1964
  - Succeeded by: Namdalseid Municipality and Namsos Municipality

Government
  - Mayor (1960–1963): Job Hodø (Sp)

Area (upon dissolution)
  - Total: 272.1 km^{2} (105.1 sq mi)
  - Rank: #302 in Norway
- Highest elevation: 680.5 m (2,233 ft)

Population (1963)
  - Total: 1,609
  - Rank: #518 in Norway
  - Density: 5.9/km^{2} (15/sq mi)
  - Change (10 years): ▲ +0.3%
- Demonym: Otterøybygg

Official language
  - Norwegian form: Neutral
- Time zone: UTC+01:00 (CET)
  - Summer (DST): UTC+02:00 (CEST)
- ISO 3166 code: NO-1747

Otterøy is a former municipality in the old Nord-Trøndelag county, Norway. The 272-square-kilometre (105 sq mi) municipality existed from 1913 until its dissolution in 1964. The area is now part of Namsos Municipality in Trøndelag county. The former municipality included most of the island of Otterøya (the part south of Tømmervikfjellet mountain), the island of Hoddøya, the southwestern part of the island of Elvalandet, and some of the mainland southwest of Otterøya and Hoddøya. The area contains good farmland and also good salmon fishing. The main church for the area is Otterøy Church.

Prior to its dissolution in 1963, the 272-square-kilometre (105 sq mi) municipality was the 302nd largest by area out of the 689 municipalities in Norway. Otterøy Municipality was the 518th most populous municipality in Norway with a population of about 1,609. The municipality's population density was 5.9 inhabitants per square kilometre (15/sq mi) and its population had increased by 0.3% over the previous 10-year period.

== General information ==
The municipality of Otterøy was established on 1 January 1913 when it was split off from the large Fosnes Municipality. Initially, Otterøy Municipality had a population of 1,631. During the 1960s, there were many municipal mergers across Norway due to the work of the Schei Committee. On 1 January 1964, Otterøy Municipality was dissolved and split between two neighboring municipalities, dividing roughly along the Namsenfjorden. All of Otterøy Municipality that was located on the mainland south of the Namsenfjord (population: 571) was merged into Namdalseid Municipality. All of Otterøy Municipality that was on the island of Otterøya and the island of Hoddøya (population: 1,013) became a part of Namsos Municipality.

=== Name ===
The municipality is named after the island of Otterøya (Old Norse: Otrøy) since the island made up a large portion of the municipality. The first element is otr which means "otter". The last element is øy which means "island". Originally, the name was spelled Otterøen until the early 20th century when it changed to Otterøy.

=== Churches ===
The Church of Norway had one parish (sokn) within Otterøy Municipality. At the time of the municipal dissolution, it was part of the Fosnes prestegjeld and the Ytre Namdal prosti (deanery) in the Diocese of Nidaros.

Churches in Otterøy Municipality
Parish (sokn)	Church name	Location of the church	Year built
Otterøy	Otterøy Church	Otterøya	1858

== Geography ==
The highest point in the municipality was the 680.5-metre (2,233 ft) tall mountain Hemnafjellet on the border with Klinga Municipality. The municipality was located along the Namsenfjorden on the mainland and on the islands of Otterøya, Hoddøya, and Elvalandet. Fosnes Municipality was located to the north, Flatanger Municipality was located to the west, Namdalseid Municipality and Klinga Municipality were both located to the south, and Vemundvik Municipality was located to the east.

== Government ==
While it existed, Otterøy Municipality was responsible for primary education (through 10th grade), outpatient health services, senior citizen services, welfare and other social services, zoning, economic development, and municipal roads and utilities. The municipality was governed by a municipal council of directly elected representatives. The mayor was indirectly elected by a vote of the municipal council. The municipality was under the jurisdiction of the Frostating Court of Appeal.

=== Municipal council ===
The municipal council (Herredsstyre) of Otterøy Municipality was made up of 13 representatives that were elected to four year terms. The tables below show the historical composition of the council by political party.

Otterøy herredsstyre 1959–1963
Party name (in Norwegian)	Number of representatives
Labour Party (Arbeiderpartiet)	4
Christian Democratic Party (Kristelig Folkeparti)	3
Joint List(s) of Non-Socialist Parties (Borgerlige Felleslister)	6
Total number of members:	13
Note: On 1 January 1964, Otterøy Municipality became part of Namsos Municipality.

Otterøy herredsstyre 1955–1959
Party name (in Norwegian)	Number of representatives
Labour Party (Arbeiderpartiet)	2
Joint List(s) of Non-Socialist Parties (Borgerlige Felleslister)	5
Local List(s) (Lokale lister)	6
Total number of members:	13

Otterøy herredsstyre 1951–1955
Party name (in Norwegian)	Number of representatives
Labour Party (Arbeiderpartiet)	2
List of workers, fishermen, and small farmholders (Arbeidere, fiskere, småbrukere liste)	2
Joint List(s) of Non-Socialist Parties (Borgerlige Felleslister)	8
Total number of members:	12

Otterøy herredsstyre 1947–1951
Party name (in Norwegian)	Number of representatives
Labour Party (Arbeiderpartiet)	3
Christian Democratic Party (Kristelig Folkeparti)	4
Local List(s) (Lokale lister)	5
Total number of members:	12

Otterøy herredsstyre 1945–1947
Party name (in Norwegian)	Number of representatives
Labour Party (Arbeiderpartiet)	3
Christian Democratic Party (Kristelig Folkeparti)	3
Local List(s) (Lokale lister)	6
Total number of members:	12

Otterøy herredsstyre 1937–1941*
Party name (in Norwegian)	Number of representatives
Labour Party (Arbeiderpartiet)	4
Local List(s) (Lokale lister)	8
Total number of members:	12
Note: Due to the German occupation of Norway during World War II, no elections were held for new municipal councils until after the war ended in 1945.

=== Mayors ===
The mayor (Norwegian: ordfører) of Otterøy Municipality was the political leader of the municipality and the chairperson of the municipal council. Here is a list of people who held this position:

- 1913–1916: Peter Øien
- 1917–1919: Ole Hovik Gårdbruker (V)
- 1920–1934: Jørgen Ludvig Ekker (Bp)
- 1935–1942: Jørgen Johannessen Ekker (V)
- 1942–1943: Sigurd Kvalstad (NS)
- 1943–1944: Vilhelm Øien (NS)
- 1944–1945: Bjarne Skavdal (NS)
- 1945–1945: Jørgen Johannessen Ekker (V)
- 1946–1947: Olav Bruknapp (KrF)
- 1948–1951: Otto Ekker (Bp)
- 1952–1955: Sverre Sørvig (H)
- 1956–1959: Erling Skorstad (Bp)
- 1960–1963: Job Hodø (Sp)

== See also ==
- List of former municipalities of Norway
