= Skomsvoll =

Village in Namsos Municipality, Norway

- Village
- Interactive map of Skomsvoll
- Location within Trøndelag Location within Norway
- Coordinates: 64.5148°N 11.2836°E
- Country: Norway
- Region: Central Norway
- County: Trøndelag
- District: Namdalen
- Municipality: Namsos Municipality
- Elevation: 20 m (66 ft)
- Time zone: UTC+01:00 (CET)
  - Summer (DST): UTC+02:00 (CEST)
- Post Code: 7819 Fosslandsosen

Skomsvoll is a village on the island of Otterøya in Namsos Municipality in Trøndelag county, Norway. It is located on the south side of the island, along the Namsenfjorden. The village of Statland lies across the fjord from Skomsvoll, with the island of Hoddøya nearby. The main church for the island, Otterøy Church is located in Skomsvoll.
