= Namsen =

River in Trøndelag, Norway

Namsen (Norwegian) Nååmesje (Southern Sami)
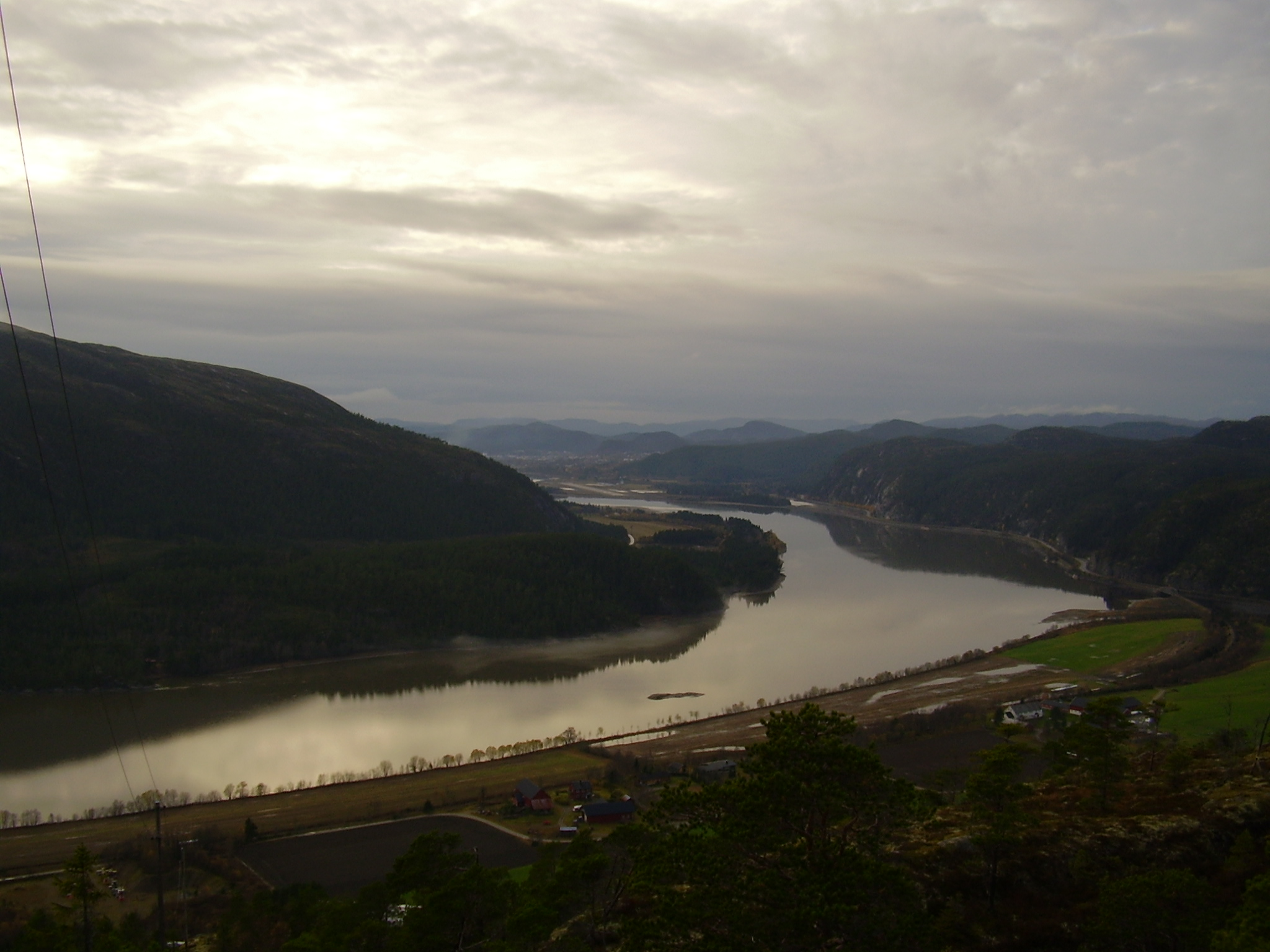
- View from Kvatningfjell, near Namsos
- Interactive map of the river

Location
- Country: Norway
- County: Trøndelag
- District: Namdalen
- Municipalities: Namsos, Overhalla, Grong, Namsskogan, Røyrvik

Physical characteristics
- Source: Namsvatnet
  - location: Røyrvik Municipality, Norway
  - coordinates: 64°59′57″N 13°44′32″E
  - elevation: 455 metres (1,493 ft)
- Mouth: Namsenfjorden
  - location: Namsos, Norway
  - coordinates: 64°27′52″N 11°31′10″E
  - elevation: 0 metres (0 ft)
- Length: 228 km (142 mi)
- Basin size: 6,298 km^{2} (2,432 sq mi)
- Discharge
  - average: 285 m^{3}/s (10,100 cu ft/s)

Basin features
- River system: Namsenvassdraget
- Tributaries
  - left: Tunnsjøelva, Sanddøla

Namsen (Norwegian) or Nååmesje (Southern Sami) is one of the longest rivers in Trøndelag county, in the central part of Norway. The 228-kilometre (142 mi) long river flows through the municipalities of Røyrvik, Namsskogan, Grong, Overhalla, and Namsos before emptying into the Namsenfjorden. The river is the namesake for the whole Namdalen region. The river traditionally has been used for floating timber down from the forests to the town of Namsos, where the sawmills were located. Today, parts of the Namsen are regulated by several dams.

== Location ==
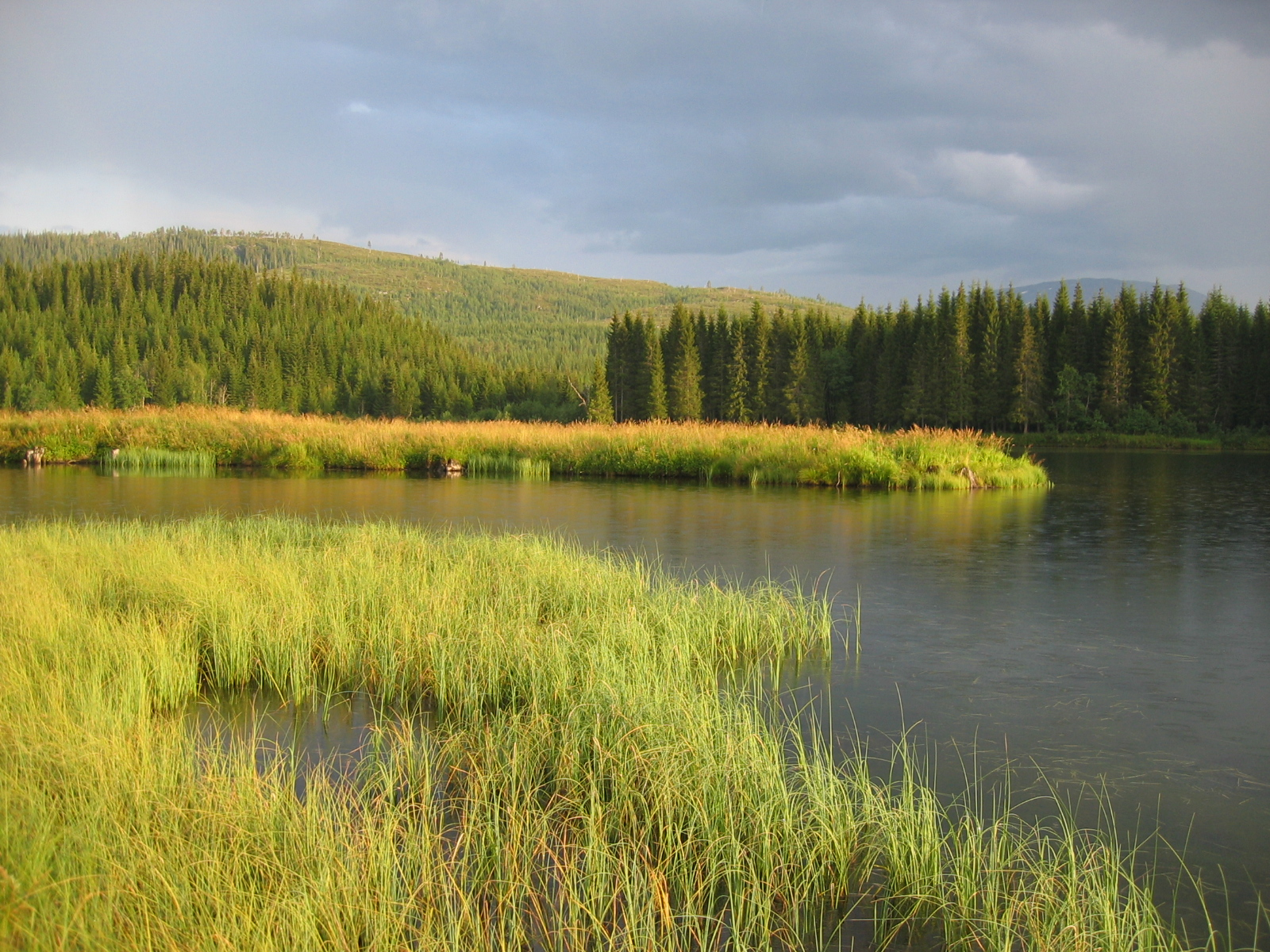
Sunset at Namsen

The river begins in springs in Børgefjell National Park, just over the border in Nordland county. This water feeds the large lake Namsvatnet. The Namsen river itself starts when the water passes through the dam on the northwest side of the lake Namsvatnet in Røyrvik Municipality.

The river then travels through the Namdalen valley towards the coast, ending at the town of Namsos where it flows into the Namsenfjorden, the same fjord into which the smaller river Årgårdselva flows. There are two major tributaries to the Namsen: Tunnsjøelva and Sanddøla.

The total watershed is approximately 6,298 square kilometres (2,432 sq mi) and at Namsos, the water discharges into the fjord at about 285 cubic metres per second (10,100 cu ft/s).

== Fishing ==
The Namsen is considered one of the best Atlantic Salmon fishing rivers in the world, and is often called the "Queen of Rivers". Beginning in the 19th century, the British found the Atlantic salmon fishing to be excellent here, and the river became a major tourist attraction. Catches above 23 kilograms (51 lb) are not unusual. The Namsen is a wide river and is thus often fished from small boats using a method called "harling". This method consists of trolling a lure while the boat moves slowly from bank to bank and drifting downstream. Thus, the salmon meet the lure as they swim upstream.

== See also ==
- Kraftverkene i Øvre Namsen
- The Norwegian Sawmill museum
