= Finnvollvatnet =

Lake in Trøndelag, Norway

- Interactive map of the lake
- Location: Namsos Municipality, Trøndelag
- Coordinates: 64.1826°N 10.9559°E
- Primary inflows: Finnvollelva river
- Primary outflows: Sverka river
- Basin countries: Norway
- Max. length: 3.9 kilometres (2.4 mi)
- Max. width: 1.4 kilometres (0.87 mi)
- Surface area: 2.97 km^{2} (1.15 sq mi)
- Shore length^{1}: 18.92 kilometres (11.76 mi)
- Surface elevation: 179 metres (587 ft)
- References: NVE
- ^{1} Shore length is not a well-defined measure.

Finnvollvatnet is a lake in Namsos Municipality in Trøndelag county, Norway. The 2.97-square-kilometre (1.15 sq mi) lake lies in the western part of the municipality, southwest of the village of Sverkmoen, and only about 3 kilometres (1.9 mi) from the border with the neighboring Osen Municipality. The lake flows out into the Sverka river which eventually ends up in the Namsenfjorden.

== See also ==
- List of lakes in Norway
