= Sverka =

- Interactive map of the river

Location
- Country: Norway
- County: Trøndelag
- Municipality: Namsos Municipality

Physical characteristics
- Source: Finnvollvatnet and Furudalsvatnet
  - location: Namsos Municipality, Norway
  - coordinates: 64.20892°N 11.03635°E
  - elevation: 178 metres (584 ft)
- Mouth: Øyungen
  - location: Namsos Municipality, Norway
  - coordinates: 64.23998°N 11.09396°E
  - elevation: 102 metres (335 ft)
- Length: 5 km (3.1 mi)

Sverka is a small river in Namsos Municipality in Trøndelag county, Norway. It flows from the lakes called Finnvollvatnet and Furudalsvatnet northeast past the Sverkmoen area to the lake Øyungen. At Øyungen, it joins the river Øyensåa which continues until it joins with the Ferja river. There, it becomes the river Årgårdselva which flows to the Namsenfjorden. There is good salmon fishing in the lower parts of the river. The river system is about 5 kilometres (3.1 mi) long.

== See also ==
- List of rivers in Norway
