= Namsos Municipality =

Municipality in Trøndelag, Norway

Namsos Municipality Namsos kommune Nåavmesjenjaelmien tjïelte
- Municipality
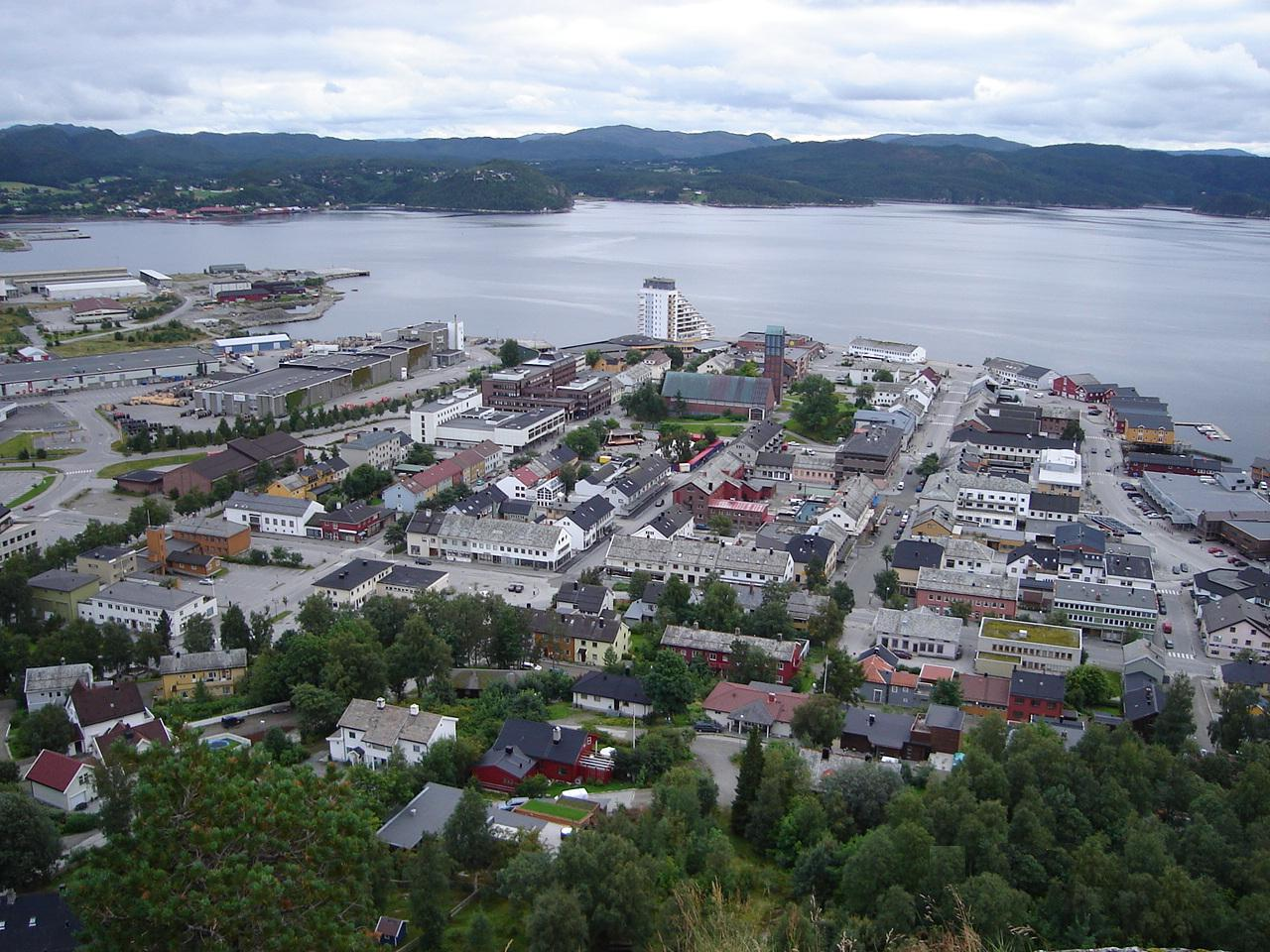

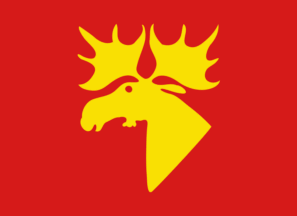
- Flag Coat of arms

- Trøndelag within Norway

- Namsos within Trøndelag
- Coordinates: 64°29′38″N 11°30′42″E
- Country: Norway
- County: Trøndelag
- District: Namdalen
- Established: 1846
  - Preceded by: Vemundvik Municipality
- Administrative centre: Namsos

Government
  - Mayor (2023): Amund Lein (H)

Area
  - Total: 2,132.36 km^{2} (823.31 sq mi)
  - Land: 1,997.81 km^{2} (771.36 sq mi)
  - Water: 134.55 km^{2} (51.95 sq mi) 6.3%
  - Rank: #30 in Norway
- Highest elevation: 765.19 m (2,510.5 ft)

Population (2024)
  - Total: 15,083
  - Rank: #82 in Norway
  - Density: 7.1/km^{2} (18/sq mi)
  - Change (10 years): ▼ −2.1%
- Demonym: Namsosing

Official language
  - Norwegian form: Neutral
- Time zone: UTC+01:00 (CET)
  - Summer (DST): UTC+02:00 (CEST)
- ISO 3166 code: NO-5007
- Website: Official website

Namsos ( (Norwegian) or Nåavmesjenjaelmie (Southern Sami) is a municipality in Trøndelag county, Norway. It is part of the Namdalen region. The administrative centre of the municipality is the town of Namsos. Some of the villages in the municipality include Bangsund, Klinga, Ramsvika, Skomsvoll, Spillum, Sævik, Dun, Salsnes, Nufsfjord, Lund, Namdalseid, Sjøåsen, Statland, Tøttdalen, and Sverkmoen.

The 2,132-square-kilometre (823 sq mi) municipality is the 30th largest by area out of the 357 municipalities in Norway. Namsos Municipality is the 82nd most populous municipality in Norway with a population of 15,083. The municipality's population density is 7.1 inhabitants per square kilometre (18/sq mi) and its population has decreased by 2.1% over the previous 10-year period.

The town of Namsos has a swimming pool, Oasen, built inside a mountain.

== General information ==
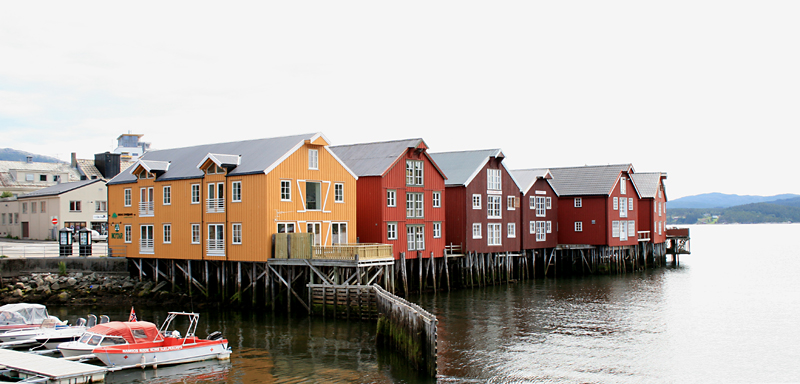
Namsos waterfront buildings

=== Name ===
The municipality is named after the town of Namsos which was established in 1846. The town was named after its location at the mouth of the river Namsen. The first element of the name is Nams- which comes from the name of the river Namsen. The river name has an uncertain origin. The first part of the river name may come from the Old Norse word Nauma) which has an unknown meaning, but it may come from the word naust which means "boat". The second part of the river name (-sen) is derived from the word sær which means "sea". The last element of the name is óss which means the "mouth of a river".

On 1 January 2020, the national government approved a merger of three municipalities: Fosnes, Namdalseid, and Namsos. Upon the merger, the new municipality would have two co-equal, official names: Namsos (Norwegian) and Nåavmesjenjaelmie (Southern Sami). The spelling of the Sami language name changes depending on how it is used. It is called Nåavmesjenjaelmie when it is spelled alone, but it is Nåavmesjenjaelmien tjïelte when using the Sami language equivalent to "Namsos municipality".

=== Coat of arms ===
The coat of arms was granted to the town of Namsos on 5 May 1961. They were re-granted on 21 October 1966 when the town was merged with neighboring areas to create a new, larger Namsos Municipality. The official blazon is "Gules, a moose head couped Or" (Norwegian: På rød bunn et gull elghode). This means the arms have a red field (background) and the charge is a moose head. The moose head has a tincture of Or which means it is commonly colored yellow, but if it is made out of metal, then gold is used. The moose was chosen as a symbol for the municipality, since Namsos is the capital of the forest-rich Namdalen region, and the moose is the "king of the forest". The arms were designed by Hallvard Trætteberg. The municipal flag has the same design as the coat of arms.

=== Churches ===
The Church of Norway has seven parishes (sokn) within Namsos Municipality. It is part of the Namdal prosti (deanery) in the Diocese of Nidaros.

Churches in Namsos Municipality
Parish (sokn)	Church name	Location of the church	Year built
Fosnes	Dun Church	Dun	1949
Fosnes	Fosnes Chapel	Fosnesvågen on Jøa	1926
Fosnes	Lund Chapel	Lund	1965
Fosnes	Salen Chapel	Salsnes	1953
Klinga	Klinga Church	Klinga	1866
Namdalseid	Namdalseid Church	Namdalseid	1858
Namsos	Namsos Church	town of Namsos	1960
Otterøy	Otterøy Church	Skomsvoll	1858
Statland	Statland Church	Statland	1992
Vemundvik	Vemundvik Church	Vemundvik	1875

== History ==
The location by the river and the large forests nearby made the location of the present day town of Namsos ideal for the construction of sawmills. There were eleven mills in the town during their heyday, but only one remains: Moelven Van Severen. In addition, the Norwegian Sawmill Museum is located at Spillum just south of the town. The museum is located at the now closed and restored Spillum Dampsag & Hovleri sawmill from 1884.

In 1865, the town of Namsos also became a parish in the Church of Norway. It had been decided to build Namsos Church in the growing town in March 1859; the construction was finished in November. In May 1865, the parish was created, with the sub-parishes of Sævik and Vemundvik, formerly within Overhalla parish, was incorporated into Namsos' parish limits.

Consisting mostly of wooden houses, the town of Namsos has been burned down to the ground on three occasions during its relatively short history. The first fire was in 1872, caused by two boys playing with matches. The second fire was in 1897, from an unknown cause. The third time was during World War II when the town was bombed by German airplanes on 20 April 1940.

=== Municipal history ===
On 1 January 1838, the parish of Vemundvik was established as Vemundvik Municipality (see formannskapsdistrikt law). In 1846, the village of Namsos, located within Vemundvik Municipality, was established as a ladested. Namsos was located at the mouth of the Namsen river in the Sævik area of Vemundvik Municipality. The new ladested (town) was established as its own independent, self-governing municipality, with 591 inhabitants. This left Vemundvik Municipality with 908 residents.

Over time, the small town of Namsos grew larger. Areas of Vemundvik Municipality lying adjacent to the town of Namsos were later incorporated within the city limits on numerous occasions. On 1 January 1882, an area with 109 inhabitants was moved to the town; on 1 July 1921 an area with 927 inhabitants; and on 1 July 1957, another area with a population of 6.

During the 1960s, there were many municipal mergers across Norway due to the work of the Schei Committee. On 1 January 1964, the size of Namsos was significantly during a large municipal merger. Namsos, which previously had a population of 5,224, was increased to 10,875 inhabitants and a much larger land area. The following areas were merged to form a new, larger Namsos Municipality.

- the town of Namsos (population: 5,224)
- all of Vemundvik Municipality (population: 2,040)
- all of Klinga Municipality (population: 2,482)
- the northern part of Otterøy Municipality (population: 1,013)
- the Finnanger area of Fosnes Municipality (population: 116)

On 1 January 2018, the municipality switched from the old Nord-Trøndelag county to the new Trøndelag county.

On 1 January 2020, Fosnes Municipality and Namdalseid Municipality were merged with Namsos Municipality. This occurred because on 16 June 2016 the three municipalities voted to merge as part of a large municipal reform across Norway. Also on 1 January 2020, the mainland Lund area of Nærøy Municipality was transferred into Namsos Municipality.

== Geography ==
The coastal municipality is located along the Namsenfjorden and at the mouth of the river Namsen, one of the richest salmon rivers in Europe. The municipality also includes the islands of Otterøya, Hoddøya, Elvalandet, and Jøa. The lakes Finnvollvatnet, Gilten, Mjøsundvatnet, and Salvatnet are all located in Namsos Municipality. The large river Namsen has its mouth in the municipality. The river Sverka also flows through Namsos.

The main part of the town of Namsos is built on a small, low-lying promontory which extends into the bay. To the north, low forested hills rise fairly steeply to over 200 metres (660 ft). There is a viewpoint from the hills above the city which is called Klompen with a height of 114 metres (374 ft) with a road for cars up to the top that is open each summer. To the east extends the wide Namdalen valley. To the south over the bay and mouth of the river Namsen are hills that reach 440 metres (1,440 ft). The highest point in the municipality is the 765.19-metre (2,510.5 ft) tall mountain Grønkleppen, along the border with Høylandet Municipality.

=== Climate ===
Namsos has a humid continental climate or oceanic climate, depending on the winter threshold used (0C or -3C). The weather station is near the small airport, situated about 3 kilometres (1.9 mi) inland from Namsos along the river. Monthly average daily high temperature range from 0 °C (32 °F) in the coldest months (January and February) to 19 °C (66 °F) in July. The all-time high is 34 °C (93 °F) recorded on 17 July 2025. The warmest month on record at the airport was July 2014 with average daily high 25.5 °C (77.9 °F) and monthly mean 19.3 °C (66.7 °F). The record low −26.6 °C (−15.9 °F) was recorded January 2010. Autumn and winter are the wettest seasons, while late spring is the driest.

Climate data for Namsos Airport 1991-2020 (2 m, precipitation from Bangdalen, extremes 2002-2025)
Month	Jan	Feb	Mar	Apr	May	Jun	Jul	Aug	Sep	Oct	Nov	Dec	Year
Record high °C (°F)	10.6 (51.1)	10.6 (51.1)	12.8 (55.0)	20.8 (69.4)	30 (86)	31.6 (88.9)	34 (93)	30.1 (86.2)	25.1 (77.2)	20.9 (69.6)	14.8 (58.6)	10.1 (50.2)	34 (93)
Mean daily maximum °C (°F)	0 (32)	0 (32)	3 (37)	7 (45)	12 (54)	16 (61)	19 (66)	18 (64)	14 (57)	8 (46)	3 (37)	1 (34)	8 (47)
Daily mean °C (°F)	−1.5 (29.3)	−2.1 (28.2)	−0.1 (31.8)	4 (39)	7.9 (46.2)	11.5 (52.7)	15 (59)	14.2 (57.6)	10.3 (50.5)	4.9 (40.8)	1.5 (34.7)	−1 (30)	5.4 (41.7)
Mean daily minimum °C (°F)	−4 (25)	−4 (25)	−2 (28)	2 (36)	6 (43)	10 (50)	13 (55)	11 (52)	8 (46)	4 (39)	0 (32)	−3 (27)	3 (38)
Record low °C (°F)	−26.6 (−15.9)	−23 (−9)	−21.2 (−6.2)	−9.4 (15.1)	−3 (27)	−0.9 (30.4)	3.6 (38.5)	1.2 (34.2)	−2.6 (27.3)	−9.2 (15.4)	−20.8 (−5.4)	−20.8 (−5.4)	−26.6 (−15.9)
Average precipitation mm (inches)	148 (5.8)	124 (4.9)	122 (4.8)	85 (3.3)	75 (3.0)	97 (3.8)	89 (3.5)	103 (4.1)	145 (5.7)	138 (5.4)	125 (4.9)	156 (6.1)	1,407 (55.3)
Source 1: Norwegian Meteorological Institute
Source 2: Tititudorancea (avg highs/lows)

== Government ==
Namsos Municipality is responsible for primary education (through 10th grade), outpatient health services, senior citizen services, welfare and other social services, zoning, economic development, and municipal roads and utilities. The municipality is governed by a municipal council of directly elected representatives. The mayor is indirectly elected by a vote of the municipal council. The municipality is under the jurisdiction of the Trøndelag District Court and the Frostating Court of Appeal.

Municipal waste management has since 1979 been handled by the inter-municipal Midtre Namdal Avfallsselskap, with ReTrans Midt handling waste collection since 2018.

=== Municipal council ===
The municipal council (Kommunestyre) of Namsos Municipality is made up of 35 representatives that are elected to four year terms. The tables below show the current and historical composition of the council by political party.

Namsos kommunestyre 2023–2027
Party name (in Norwegian)	Number of representatives
Labour Party (Arbeiderpartiet)	9
Progress Party (Fremskrittspartiet)	2
Conservative Party (Høyre)	10
Industry and Business Party (Industri‑ og Næringspartiet)	1
Christian Democratic Party (Kristelig Folkeparti)	1
Red Party (Rødt)	1
Centre Party (Senterpartiet)	6
Socialist Left Party (Sosialistisk Venstreparti)	3
Liberal Party (Venstre)	2
Total number of members:	35

Namsos kommunestyre 2019–2023
Party name (in Norwegian)	Number of representatives
Labour Party (Arbeiderpartiet)	18
Progress Party (Fremskrittspartiet)	2
Green Party (Miljøpartiet De Grønne)	1
Conservative Party (Høyre)	4
Christian Democratic Party (Kristelig Folkeparti)	1
Red Party (Rødt)	1
Centre Party (Senterpartiet)	10
Socialist Left Party (Sosialistisk Venstreparti)	3
Liberal Party (Venstre)	1
Total number of members:	41
Note: On 1 January 2020, Namdalseid Municipality and Fosnes Municipality became part of Namsos Municipality.

Namsos kommunestyre 2015–2019
Party name (in Norwegian)	Number of representatives
Labour Party (Arbeiderpartiet)	13
Progress Party (Fremskrittspartiet)	2
Conservative Party (Høyre)	4
Christian Democratic Party (Kristelig Folkeparti)	1
Centre Party (Senterpartiet)	2
Socialist Left Party (Sosialistisk Venstreparti)	3
Liberal Party (Venstre)	2
Total number of members:	27

Namsos kommunestyre 2011–2015
Party name (in Norwegian)	Number of representatives
Labour Party (Arbeiderpartiet)	14
Progress Party (Fremskrittspartiet)	3
Conservative Party (Høyre)	6
Christian Democratic Party (Kristelig Folkeparti)	2
Centre Party (Senterpartiet)	2
Socialist Left Party (Sosialistisk Venstreparti)	7
Liberal Party (Venstre)	3
Total number of members:	37

Namsos kommunestyre 2007–2011
Party name (in Norwegian)	Number of representatives
Labour Party (Arbeiderpartiet)	10
Progress Party (Fremskrittspartiet)	6
Conservative Party (Høyre)	4
Christian Democratic Party (Kristelig Folkeparti)	2
Centre Party (Senterpartiet)	2
Socialist Left Party (Sosialistisk Venstreparti)	9
Liberal Party (Venstre)	4
Total number of members:	37

Namsos kommunestyre 2003–2007
Party name (in Norwegian)	Number of representatives
Labour Party (Arbeiderpartiet)	10
Progress Party (Fremskrittspartiet)	4
Conservative Party (Høyre)	3
Christian Democratic Party (Kristelig Folkeparti)	2
Centre Party (Senterpartiet)	3
Socialist Left Party (Sosialistisk Venstreparti)	13
Liberal Party (Venstre)	2
Total number of members:	37

Namsos kommunestyre 1999–2003
Party name (in Norwegian)	Number of representatives
Labour Party (Arbeiderpartiet)	11
Progress Party (Fremskrittspartiet)	3
Conservative Party (Høyre)	5
Christian Democratic Party (Kristelig Folkeparti)	2
Centre Party (Senterpartiet)	2
Socialist Left Party (Sosialistisk Venstreparti)	12
Liberal Party (Venstre)	2
Total number of members:	37

Namsos kommunestyre 1995–1999
Party name (in Norwegian)	Number of representatives
Labour Party (Arbeiderpartiet)	23
Conservative Party (Høyre)	6
Christian Democratic Party (Kristelig Folkeparti)	2
Centre Party (Senterpartiet)	6
Socialist Left Party (Sosialistisk Venstreparti)	6
Liberal Party (Venstre)	4
Total number of members:	47

Namsos kommunestyre 1991–1995
Party name (in Norwegian)	Number of representatives
Labour Party (Arbeiderpartiet)	20
Conservative Party (Høyre)	6
Christian Democratic Party (Kristelig Folkeparti)	3
Centre Party (Senterpartiet)	5
Socialist Left Party (Sosialistisk Venstreparti)	9
Liberal Party (Venstre)	4
Total number of members:	47

Namsos kommunestyre 1987–1991
Party name (in Norwegian)	Number of representatives
Labour Party (Arbeiderpartiet)	21
Progress Party (Fremskrittspartiet)	3
Conservative Party (Høyre)	7
Christian Democratic Party (Kristelig Folkeparti)	3
Centre Party (Senterpartiet)	3
Socialist Left Party (Sosialistisk Venstreparti)	5
Liberal Party (Venstre)	5
Total number of members:	47

Namsos kommunestyre 1983–1987
Party name (in Norwegian)	Number of representatives
Labour Party (Arbeiderpartiet)	24
Progress Party (Fremskrittspartiet)	1
Conservative Party (Høyre)	8
Communist Party (Kommunistiske Parti)	1
Christian Democratic Party (Kristelig Folkeparti)	3
Centre Party (Senterpartiet)	3
Socialist Left Party (Sosialistisk Venstreparti)	3
Liberal Party (Venstre)	4
Total number of members:	47

Namsos kommunestyre 1979–1983
Party name (in Norwegian)	Number of representatives
Labour Party (Arbeiderpartiet)	24
Conservative Party (Høyre)	8
Christian Democratic Party (Kristelig Folkeparti)	4
Centre Party (Senterpartiet)	4
Liberal Party (Venstre)	4
Joint list of the Communist Party and independent socialists (Norges Kommunistiske Parti og uavhengige sosialister)	3
Total number of members:	47

Namsos kommunestyre 1975–1979
Party name (in Norwegian)	Number of representatives
Labour Party (Arbeiderpartiet)	23
Conservative Party (Høyre)	5
Christian Democratic Party (Kristelig Folkeparti)	5
New People's Party (Nye Folkepartiet)	1
Centre Party (Senterpartiet)	6
Socialist Left Party (Sosialistisk Venstreparti)	4
Liberal Party (Venstre)	3
Total number of members:	47

Namsos kommunestyre 1971–1975
Party name (in Norwegian)	Number of representatives
Labour Party (Arbeiderpartiet)	22
Conservative Party (Høyre)	4
Communist Party (Kommunistiske Parti)	2
Christian Democratic Party (Kristelig Folkeparti)	5
Centre Party (Senterpartiet)	6
Socialist People's Party (Sosialistisk Folkeparti)	4
Liberal Party (Venstre)	4
Total number of members:	47

Namsos kommunestyre 1967–1971
Party name (in Norwegian)	Number of representatives
Labour Party (Arbeiderpartiet)	22
Conservative Party (Høyre)	4
Communist Party (Kommunistiske Parti)	1
Christian Democratic Party (Kristelig Folkeparti)	4
Centre Party (Senterpartiet)	5
Socialist People's Party (Sosialistisk Folkeparti)	5
Liberal Party (Venstre)	6
Total number of members:	47

Namsos kommunestyre 1963–1967
Party name (in Norwegian)	Number of representatives
Labour Party (Arbeiderpartiet)	23
Conservative Party (Høyre)	4
Communist Party (Kommunistiske Parti)	3
Christian Democratic Party (Kristelig Folkeparti)	4
Centre Party (Senterpartiet)	4
Socialist People's Party (Sosialistisk Folkeparti)	2
Liberal Party (Venstre)	7
Total number of members:	47

Namsos bystyre 1959–1963
Party name (in Norwegian)	Number of representatives
Labour Party (Arbeiderpartiet)	15
Conservative Party (Høyre)	3
Communist Party (Kommunistiske Parti)	3
Christian Democratic Party (Kristelig Folkeparti)	2
Liberal Party (Venstre)	6
Total number of members:	29

Namsos bystyre 1955–1959
Party name (in Norwegian)	Number of representatives
Labour Party (Arbeiderpartiet)	16
Conservative Party (Høyre)	3
Communist Party (Kommunistiske Parti)	3
Christian Democratic Party (Kristelig Folkeparti)	2
Liberal Party (Venstre)	5
Total number of members:	29

Namsos bystyre 1951–1955
Party name (in Norwegian)	Number of representatives
Labour Party (Arbeiderpartiet)	14
Conservative Party (Høyre)	3
Communist Party (Kommunistiske Parti)	3
Christian Democratic Party (Kristelig Folkeparti)	2
Liberal Party (Venstre)	6
Total number of members:	28

Namsos bystyre 1947–1951
Party name (in Norwegian)	Number of representatives
Labour Party (Arbeiderpartiet)	13
Conservative Party (Høyre)	2
Communist Party (Kommunistiske Parti)	6
Christian Democratic Party (Kristelig Folkeparti)	3
Liberal Party (Venstre)	4
Total number of members:	28

Namsos bystyre 1945–1947
Party name (in Norwegian)	Number of representatives
Labour Party (Arbeiderpartiet)	13
Conservative Party (Høyre)	2
Communist Party (Kommunistiske Parti)	7
Christian Democratic Party (Kristelig Folkeparti)	2
Liberal Party (Venstre)	4
Total number of members:	28

Namsos bystyre 1937–1941*
Party name (in Norwegian)	Number of representatives
Labour Party (Arbeiderpartiet)	15
Conservative Party (Høyre)	4
Liberal Party (Venstre)	9
Total number of members:	28
Note: Due to the German occupation of Norway during World War II, no elections were held for new municipal councils until after the war ended in 1945.

Namsos bystyre 1934–1937
Party name (in Norwegian)	Number of representatives
Labour Party (Arbeiderpartiet)	15
Conservative Party (Høyre)	4
Liberal Party (Venstre)	9
Total number of members:	28

Namsos bystyre 1931–1934
Party name (in Norwegian)	Number of representatives
Labour Party (Arbeiderpartiet)	13
Temperance Party (Avholdspartiet)	3
Conservative Party (Høyre)	5
Liberal Party (Venstre)	7
Total number of members:	28

Namsos bystyre 1928–1931
Party name (in Norwegian)	Number of representatives
Temperance Party (Avholdspartiet)	3
Radical People's Party (Radikale Folkepartiet)	13
Liberal Party (Venstre)	8
Joint list of the Conservative Party (Høyre) and the Free-minded Liberal Party (Frisinnede Venstre)	4
Total number of members:	28

Namsos bystyre 1925–1928
Party name (in Norwegian)	Number of representatives
Labour Party (Arbeiderpartiet)	8
Temperance Party (Avholdspartiet)	5
Social Democratic Labour Party (Socialdemokratiske Arbeiderparti)	8
Liberal Party (Venstre)	3
Joint list of the Conservative Party (Høyre) and the Free-minded Liberal Party (Frisinnede Venstre)	4
Total number of members:	28

Namsos bystyre 1922–1925
Party name (in Norwegian)	Number of representatives
Labour Party (Arbeiderpartiet)	9
Temperance Party (Avholdspartiet)	4
Labour Democrats (Arbeiderdemokratene)	1
Social Democratic Labour Party (Socialdemokratiske Arbeiderparti)	6
Liberal Party (Venstre)	3
Joint list of the Conservative Party (Høyre) and the Free-minded Liberal Party (Frisinnede Venstre)	5
Total number of members:	28

=== Mayors ===
The mayor (Norwegian: ordfører) of Namsos Municipality is the political leader of the municipality and the chairperson of the municipal council. The first mayor was not elected until 1855, several years after the establishment of the town. During that period of time, the town was governed by the municipal council of the surrounding district. Here is a list of people who have held the position of mayor:

- 1855–1857: Theodor Wessel
- 1858–1858: Christian Møinichen Havig
- 1859–1859: Theodor Wessel
- 1860–1860: Carl Julius Olsen
- 1861–1863: Theodor Wessel
- 1864–1864: Carl Julius Olsen
- 1865–1867: Johan Sommerschield
- 1868–1868: Niels Bjørum
- 1869–1869: H.J. Blix
- 1870–1870: J. Salvesen
- 1871–1875: Johan Sommerschield
- 1876–1878: Andreas Erlandsen
- 1879–1886: Johannes Bernhard Havig (H)
- 1887–1894: Karl Greiff (H)
- 1895–1899: Carl Hustad (V)
- 1900–1905: Karl Greiff (H)
- 1906–1907: Ole Severin Aavatsmark (V)
- 1908–1909: Otto Christian Dahl (AvH)
- 1910–1913: Ole Severin Aavatsmark (V)
- 1914–1919: Anton M. Brandtzæg (H)
- 1920–1922: Einar Hustad (V)
- 1923–1924: Hermann Thornes (Ap)
- 1924–1926: Wilhelm Jakobsen (Ap)
- 1927–1927: Johan Wiik (Ap)
- 1928–1928: Reidar O. Frog (Ap)
- 1929–1930: Einar Hustad (V)
- 1930–1934: Johannes Dahl (AvH)
- 1935–1941: Hermann Thornes (Ap/NS)
- 1941–1945: Arne Dahl (NS)
- 1945–1945: Johan L. Gundersen (Ap)
- 1946–1947: Nils Bleness (Ap)
- 1947–1947: Adolf Holm (Ap)
- 1948–1951: Eystein Sjaamo (Ap)
- 1952–1955: Olferd Hojem (Ap)
- 1956–1963: Erling Thun (Ap)
- 1964–1975: Svein Lorentzen (Ap)
- 1976–1991: Gunnar Solum (Ap)
- 1992–2003: Snorre Ness (Ap)
- 2003–2007: Kåre Aalberg (SV)
- 2007–2015: Morten Stene (Ap)
- 2015–2021: Arnhild Holstad (Ap)
- 2021–2023: Frode Båtnes (Ap)
- 2023–present: Amund Lein (H)

== Transportation ==
Namsos Airport is located about 3 kilometres (1.9 mi) east of the town of Namsos, with direct flights to Oslo, Trondheim, Rørvik, Mosjøen, Bodø. Norwegian County Road 17 runs through part of the municipality.

The closed Namsos Line runs from Namsos to Grong. The island of Otterøya is connected to the mainland via the Lokkaren Bridge.

== Notable people ==
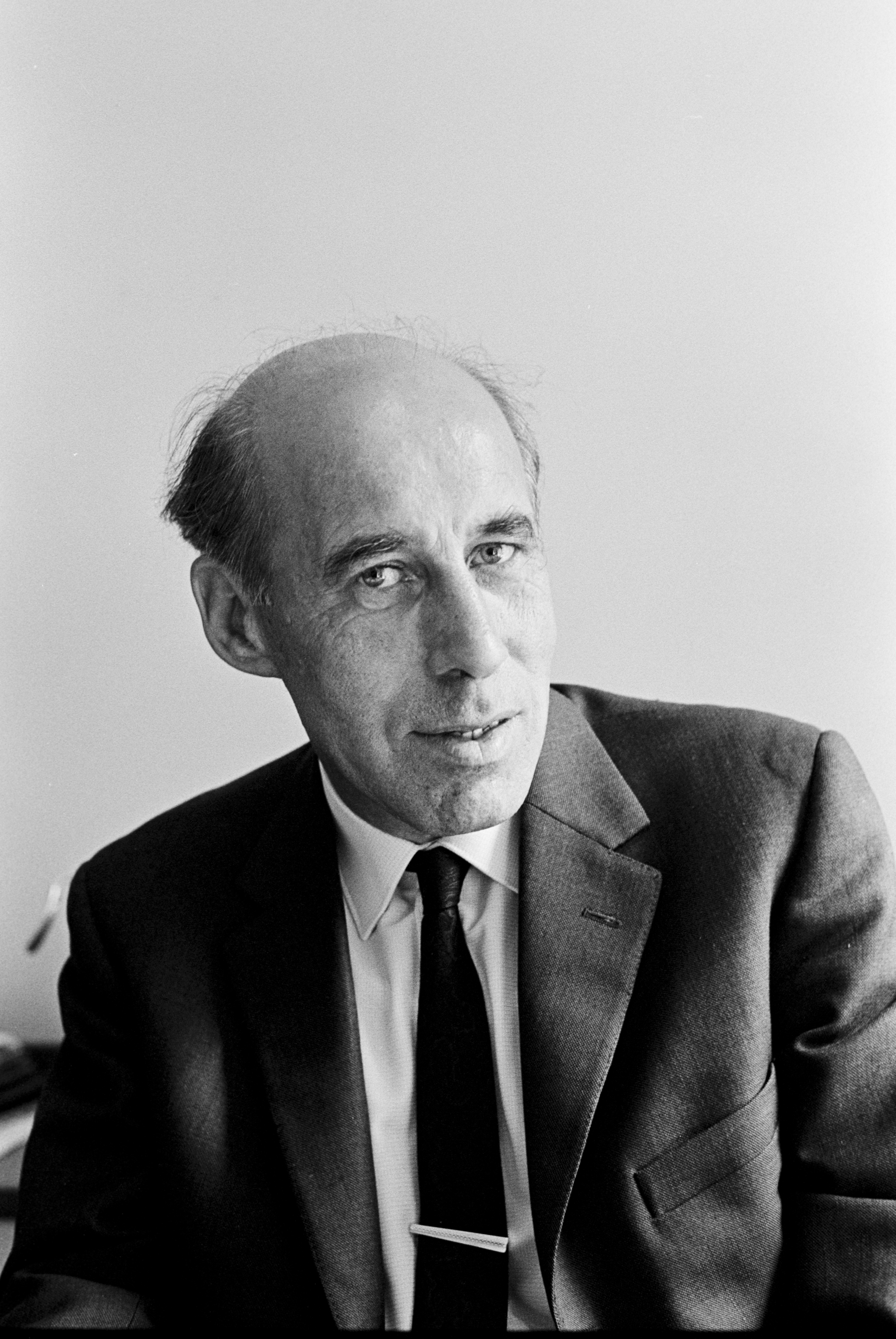
Guttorm Hansen, 1970

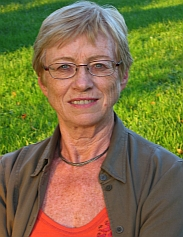
Anne Alvik, 2006

=== Public service ===
- Jørgen Johannes Havig (1808–1883), a bailiff (lensmann), farmer, and politician who helped found the town of Namsos
- Christian Møinichen Havig (1825 in Overhalla – 1912), a Norwegian bailiff (lensmann)
- Fredrik Havig (1855 in Namdalen – 1927), a Norwegian judge, mayor, and politician
- Osborne J. P. Widtsoe (1877 in Namsos – 1920), the principal of the Latter-day Saints University in Salt Lake City
- Olav Heggstad (1877 in Namsos – 1954), a civil engineer and professor at the Norwegian Institute of Technology
- Otto Christian Dahl (1903 in Namsos – 1995), a missionary in Madagascar, linguist, and government scholar
- Knut Løfsnes (1918 in Namsos – 1996), a Norwegian resistance member, politician, and lawyer
- Guttorm Hansen (1920 in Namsos – 2009), a writer and politician, President of the Storting from 1973 to 1981, and a prolific book writer
- Gunnar Solum (1929–2008), a Norwegian politician who was a four-time Mayor of Namsos
- Anne Alvik (born 1937), a physician and civil servant
- Harald Tveit Alvestrand (born 1959 Namsos), a computer scientist

=== The Arts ===
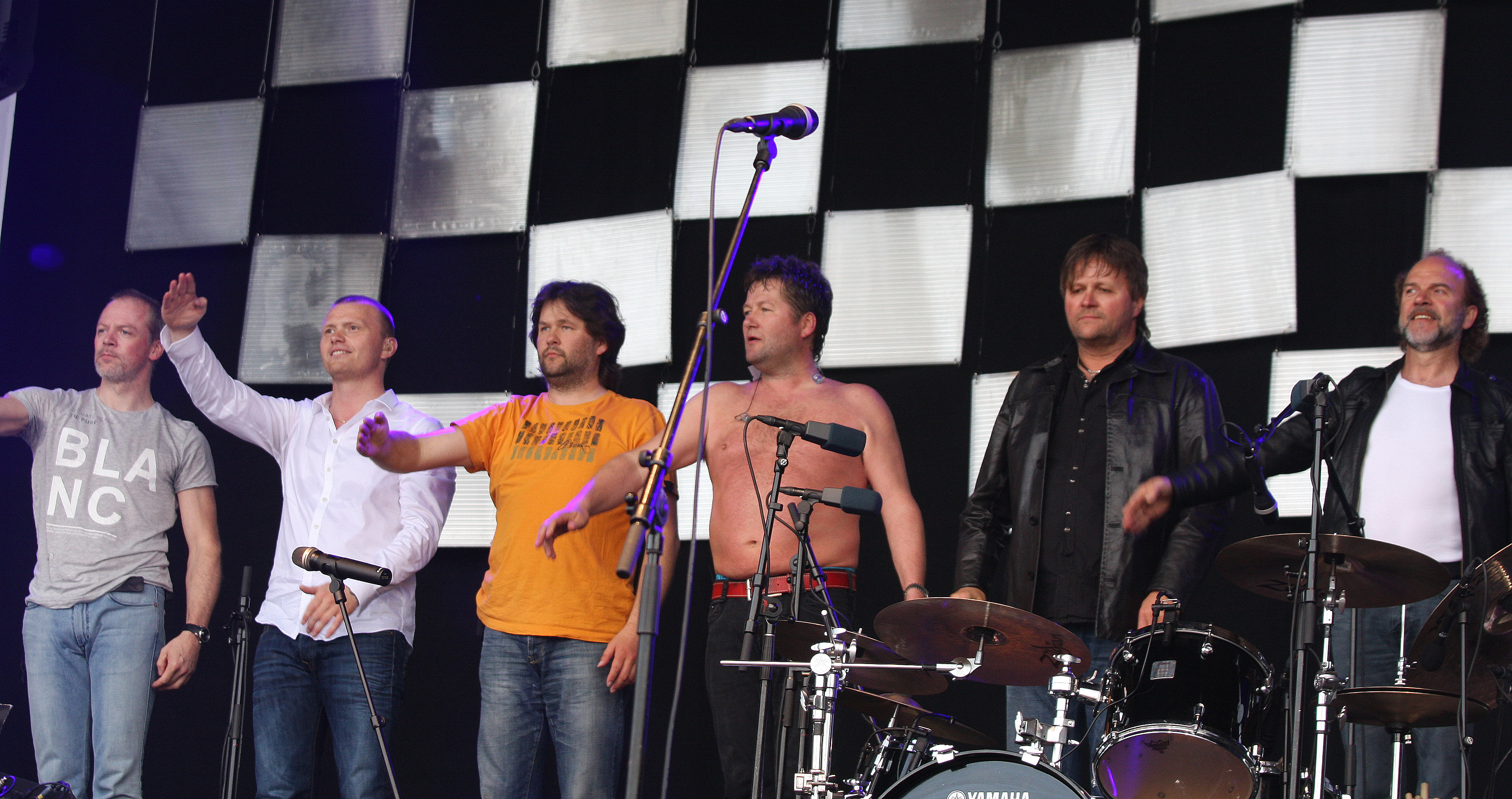
DDE Group, 2009

- Olav Duun (1876 on Jøa – 1939), a noteworthy author of Norwegian fiction
- Arne Svendsen (1884 in Fosnes – 1958), a songwriter, folk poet, actor, and revue writer
- Simon Flem Devold (1929 in Namsos – 2015), an author, journalist, and jazz clarinetist
- Åge Aleksandersen (born 1949 in Namsos), a Norwegian singer, songwriter, and guitarist
- Terje Tysland (born 1951 in Namsos), a singer, songwriter, guitarist, and accordion player
- Idar Lind (born 1954 on Otterøya), novelist, crime fiction writer, songwriter, and playwright
- Carl Frode Tiller (born 1970 in Namsos), a Nynorsk author, historian, and musician
- Frode Saugestad (born 1974 in Namsos), a literary scholar, publisher, and adventurer
- Jostein Gulbrandsen (born 1976 in Namsos), a New York-based guitarist, and composer
- Jon Rune Strøm (born 1985 in Namsos), a Jazz musician who plays upright bass and bass guitar
- D.D.E., a pop/rock group founded in Namsos in 1992

=== Sport ===
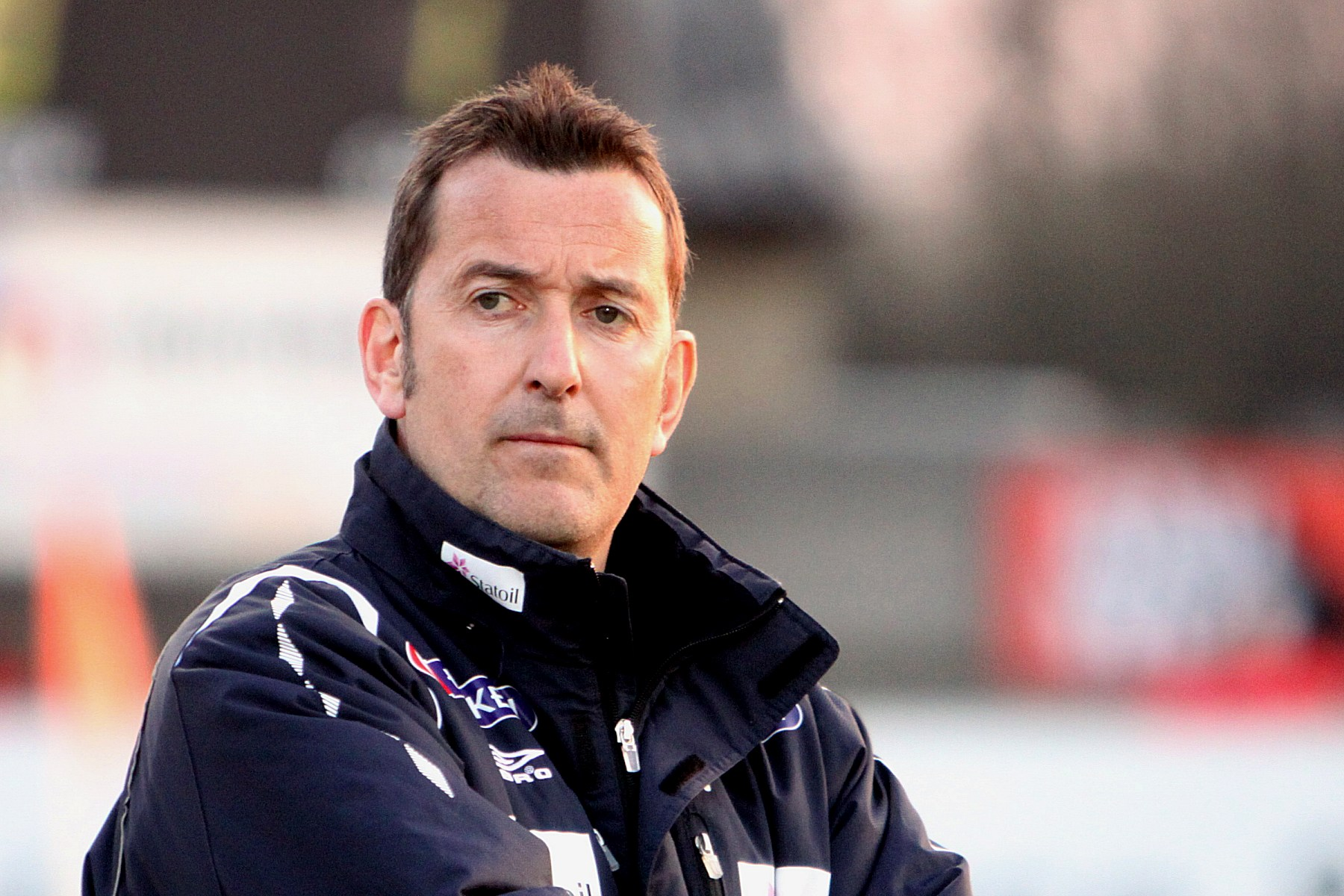
Per Joar Hansen, 2011

- Anton Dahl (1882 in Bangsund–1952), a sports shooter who competed at the 1920 Summer Olympics
- Tone Haugen (born 1964 in Namsos), a former footballer with 90 appearances with the Norway women's national football team and team bronze medallist at the 1996 Summer Olympics
- Per Joar Hansen (born 1965 in Namsos), a Norwegian football coach
- Twins Nina Solheim & Mona Solheim (born 1979), Norwegian taekwondo practitioners. Olympic and World Taekwondo medalists.
- Gunhild Følstad (born 1981 in Overhalla), a former footballer who made 76 appearances for the Norway women's national football team
- Kjell Rune Sellin (born 1989 in Namsos), a footballer with over 300 club caps

== Media gallery ==
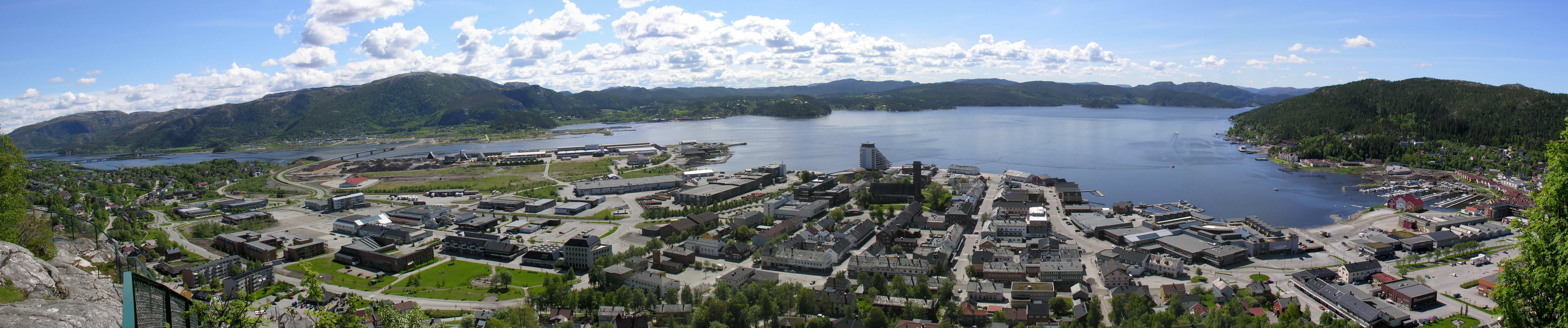
Panorama of the town of Namsos
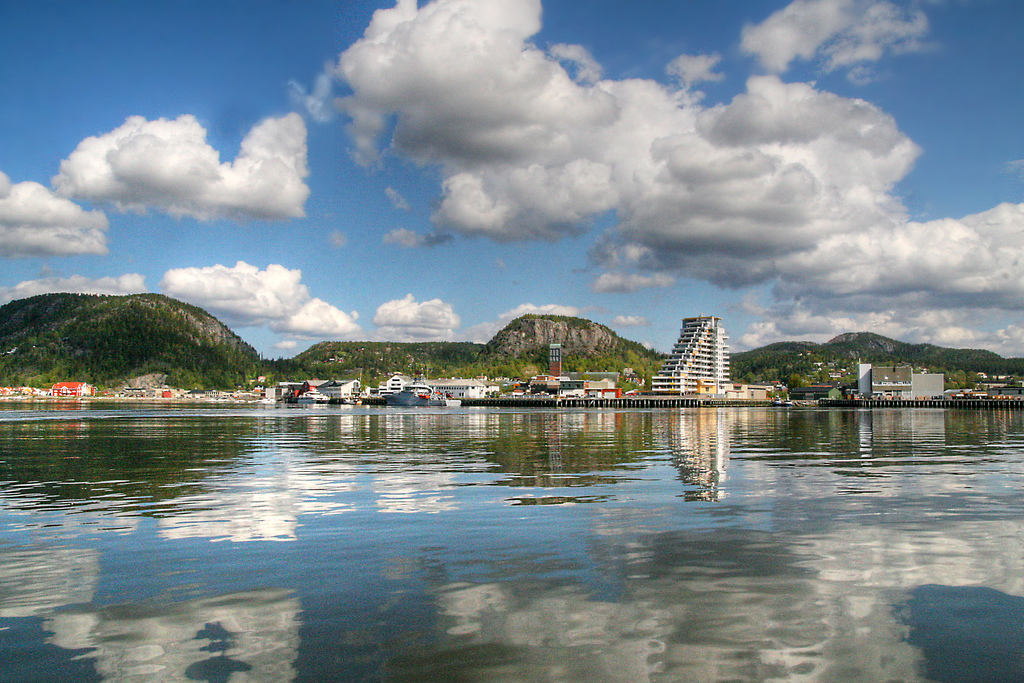
View of the town from the fjord

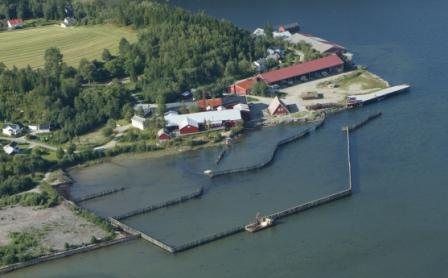
Sawmill Museum

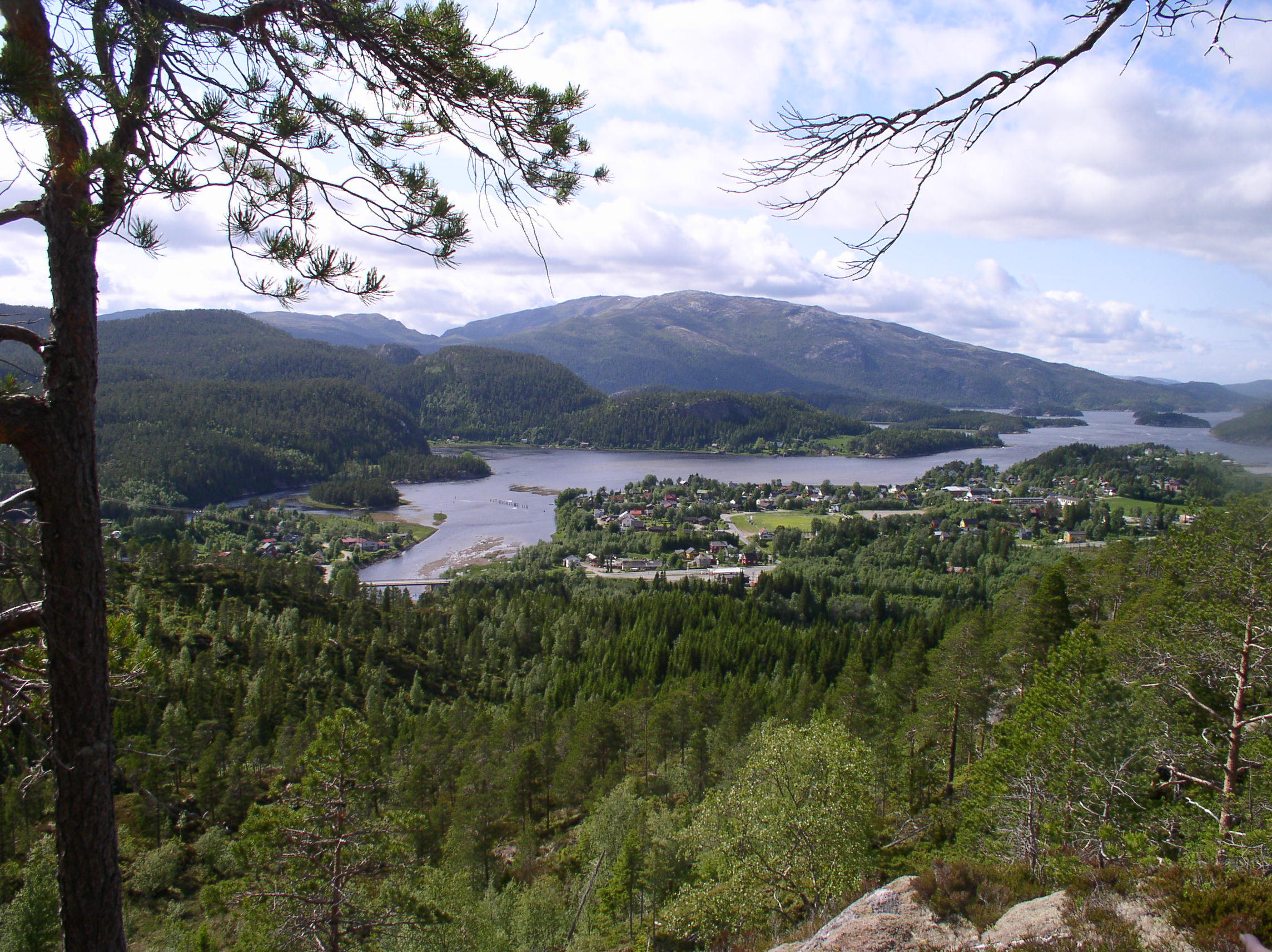
View of Bangsund

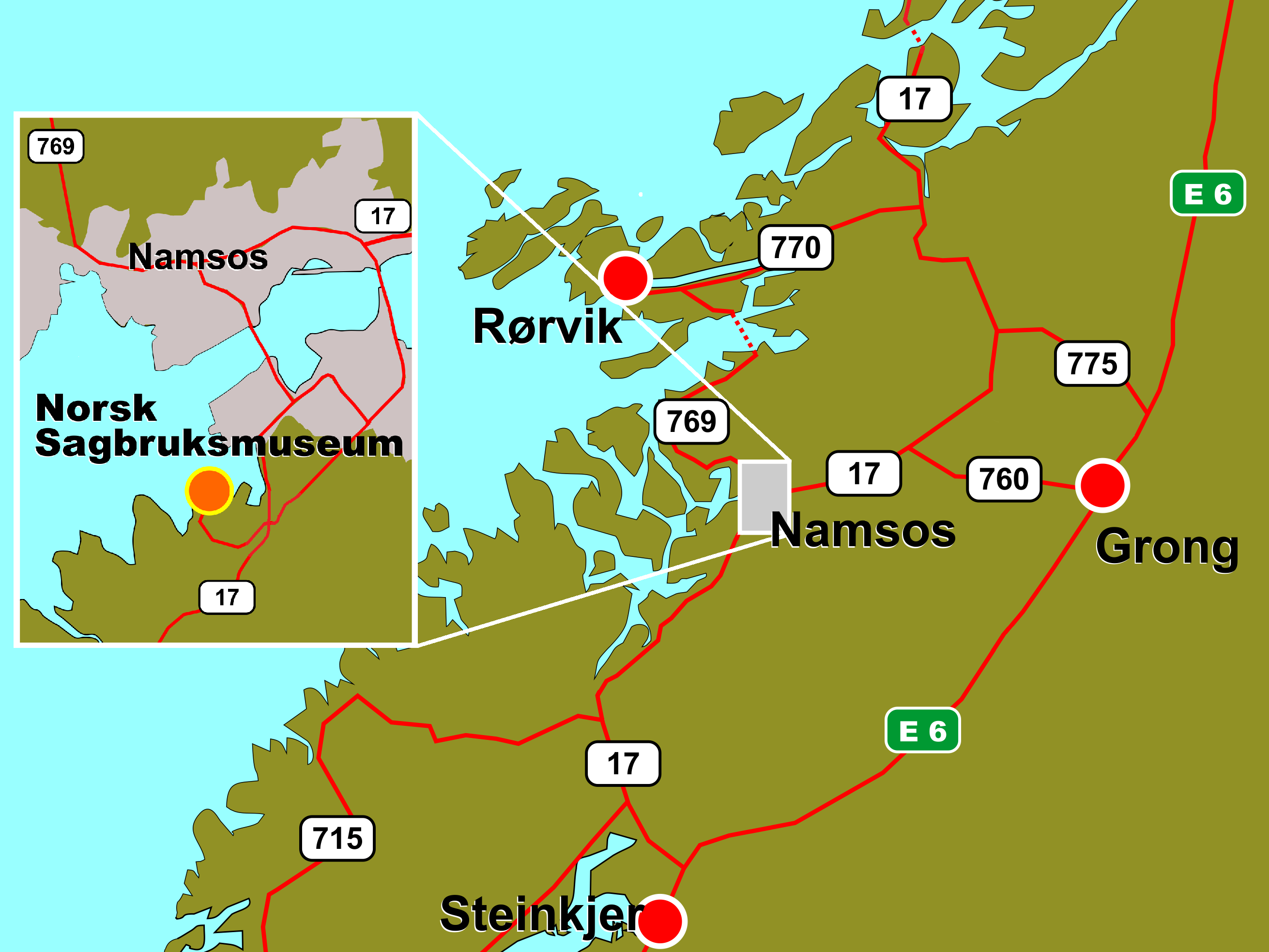
Map of the area

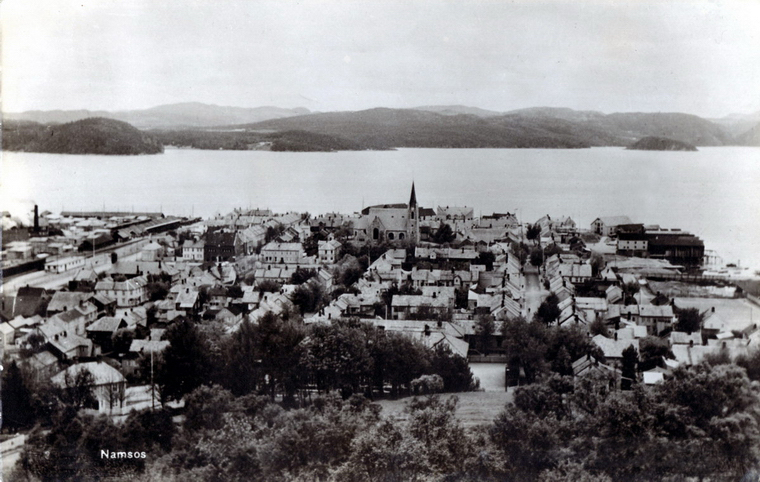
View of the town in 1935

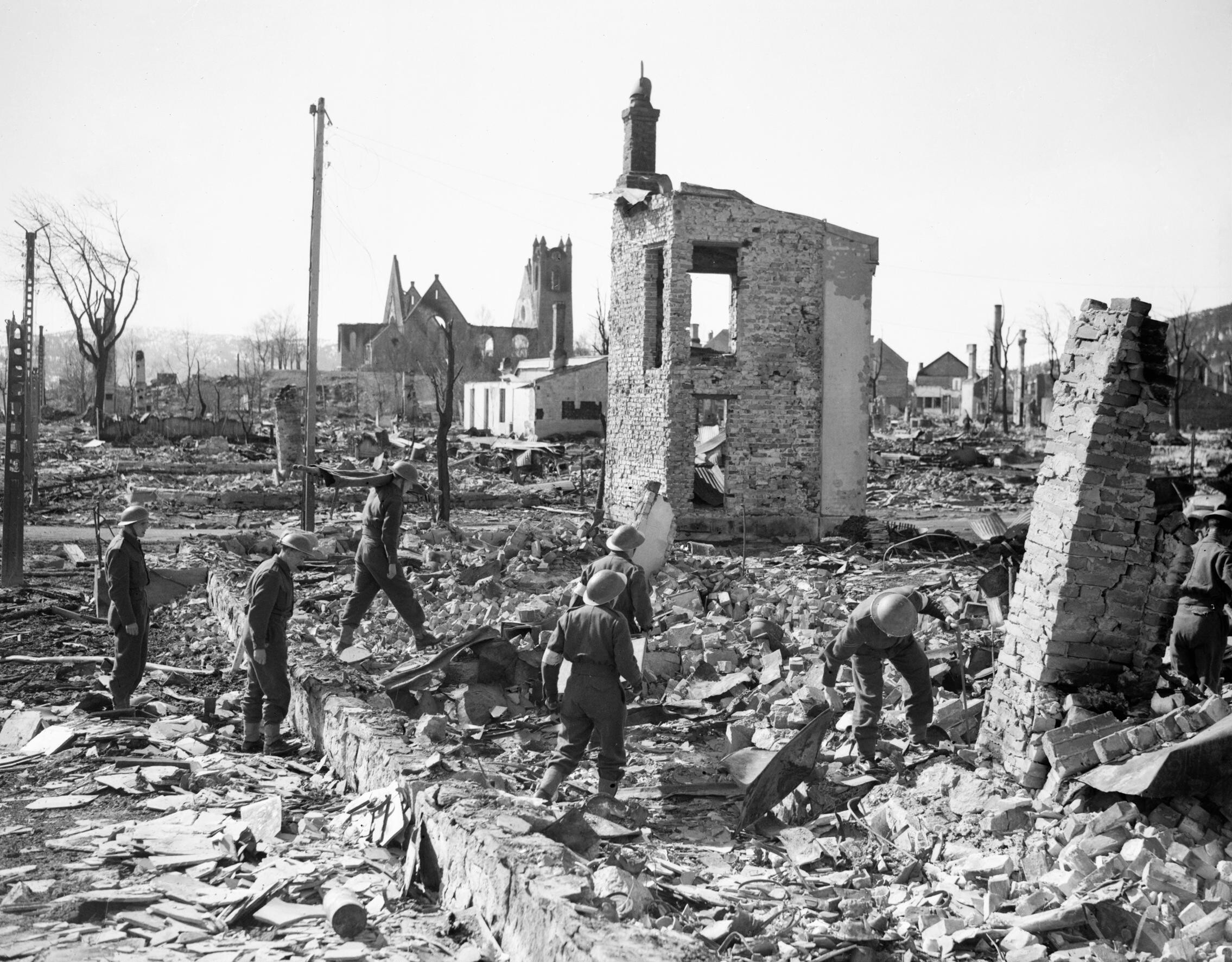
View of the town in 1940 after the German bombing
