= Elvalandet =

Island in Trøndelag, Norway

- Interactive map of Elvalandet

Geography
- Location: Trøndelag, Norway
- Coordinates: 64.5814°N 11.3930°E
- Area: 38.184 km^{2} (14.743 sq mi)
- Area rank: 82nd in Norway
- Length: 12 km (7.5 mi)
- Width: 7 km (4.3 mi)
- Highest elevation: 317 m (1040 ft)
- Highest point: Strandfjellet

Administration
- Norway
- County: Trøndelag
- Municipalities: Namsos Municipality

Elvalandet is an island in Namsos Municipality in Trøndelag county, Norway. The 38.184-square-kilometre (14.743 sq mi) island is located in the Lauvøyfjorden, just south of the island of Jøa, east of the island of Otterøya, and west of the mainland. The town of Namsos lies about 10 kilometres (6.2 mi) south of the island.

The island is connected to the mainland by a bridge on the Norwegian County Road 769. There is a ferry connection on the north side of the island to the nearby island of Jøa. Most of the island is forested. The island is the 82nd largest island in Norway.

== See also ==
- List of islands of Norway
