= Gunnar Solum =

Norwegian politician (1929–2008)

Gunnar Solum (1929 – 11 June 2008) was a Norwegian politician for the Labour Party.

He started his career in journalism. He was editor-in-chief of Brønnøysunds Avis, then became a journalist in Namdalsavisa in 1961. He was promoted to chief editor in 1970.

In 1975 he was elected mayor of Namsos Municipality, and resigned as newspaper editor. He had first been elected to the municipal council in 1952. He served as mayor for four terms, to 1991. He was instrumental in the relocation of the Statskog agency from Oslo to Namsos. He was also a member of Nord-Trøndelag county council from 1991 to 1995, and served as a deputy member from 2003 to his death. He was an honorary member of the national Labour Party.

In his younger days he was a footballer for Namsos IL.
