= Lokkaren Bridge =

Lokkaren Bridge Lokkarbrua
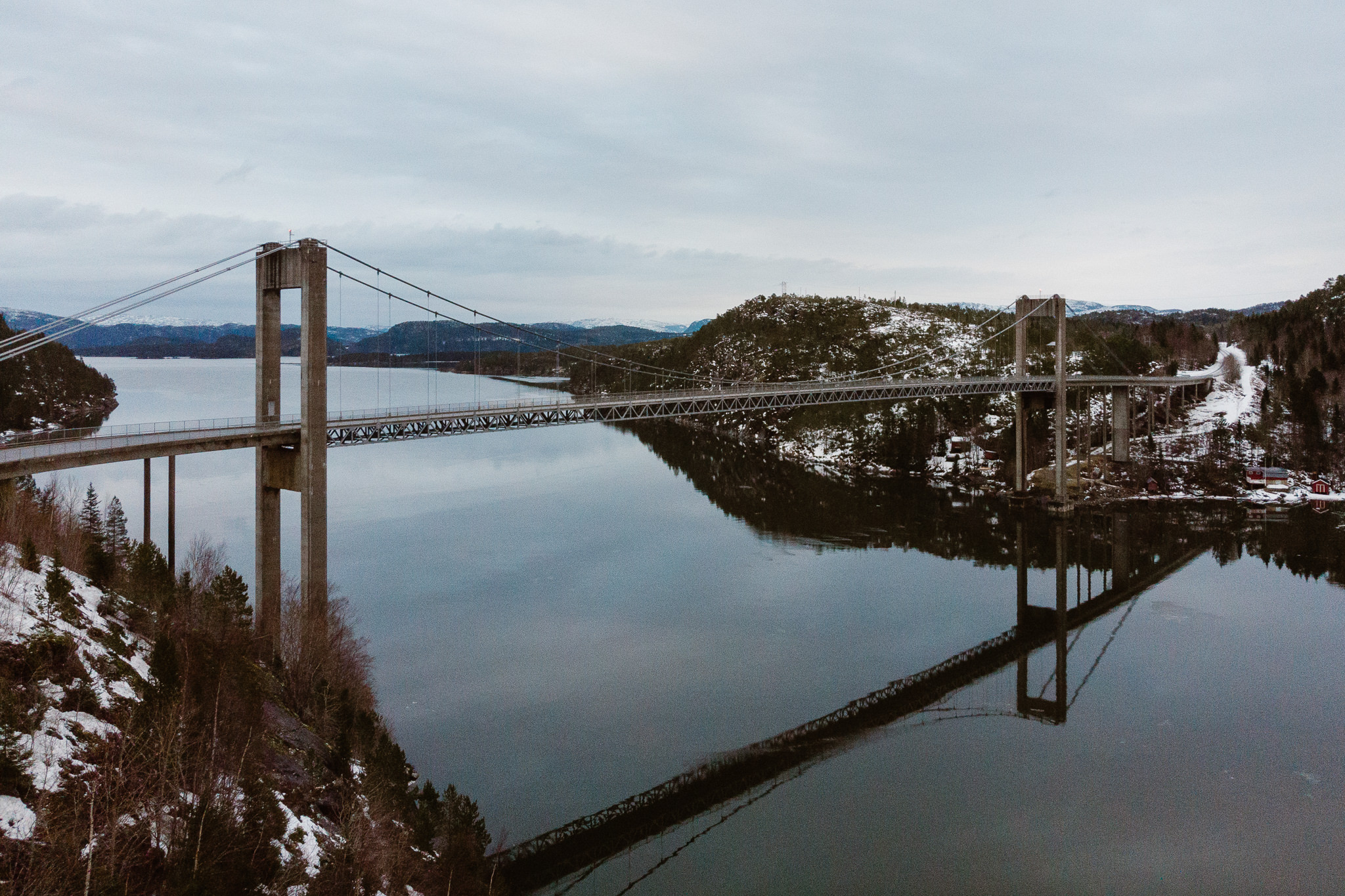
- Aerial view of the bridge
- Coordinates: 64°30′25″N 11°26′37″E
- Carries: Fv767
- Crosses: Lokkarsundet
- Locale: Namsos Municipality, Norway

Characteristics
- Design: Suspension bridge
- Total length: 435 metres (1,427 ft)
- Longest span: 225 metres (738 ft)

History
- Opened: 2 December 1977

Location
- Interactive map of Lokkaren Bridge

The Lokkaren Bridge (Norwegian: Lokkarbrua or Lokkaren bru) is a suspension bridge in Namsos Municipality in Trøndelag county, Norway. The bridge crosses the Lokkarsundet strait that runs between the mainland of Namsos and the island of Otterøya. The bridge is located about 6 kilometres (4 mi) northwest of the town of Namsos. The 435-metre-long (1,427 ft) bridge was opened on 2 December 1977.
