= Hoddøya =

Island in Trøndelag, Norway

- Interactive map of Hoddøya

Geography
- Location: Trøndelag, Norway
- Coordinates: 64.4822°N 11.2140°E
- Area: 10.3 km^{2} (4.0 sq mi)
- Length: 5.5 km (3.42 mi)
- Width: 3.5 km (2.17 mi)
- Coastline: 25 km (15.5 mi)
- Highest elevation: 207 m (679 ft)
- Highest point: Vattafjellet

Administration
- Norway
- County: Trøndelag
- Municipality: Namsos Municipality

Hoddøya is an island in Namsos Municipality in Trøndelag county, Norway. It lies in the Namsenfjorden, about 12 kilometres (7.5 mi) west of the town of Namsos. The island is located between the island of Otterøya (to the north and east) and the mainland of Namsos Municipality (to the south and west). The highest point on the 10.3-square-kilometre (4.0 sq mi) island is the 207-metre (679 ft) tall mountain Vattafjellet.

== See also ==
- List of islands of Norway
