= Statland =

Village in Namsos Municipality, Norway

- Village
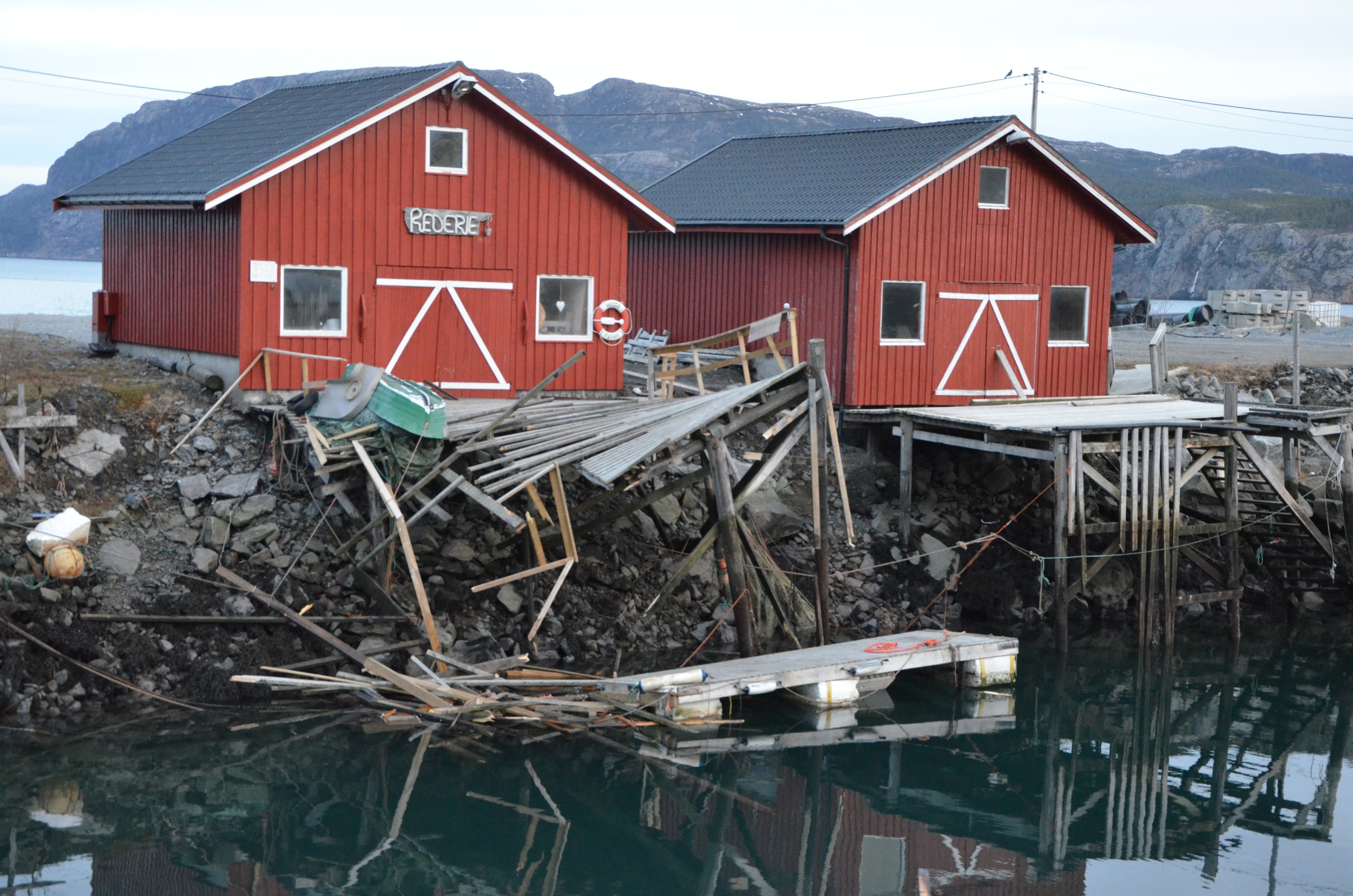
- View of the village
- Interactive map of Statland
- Location within Trøndelag Location within Norway
- Coordinates: 64.4955°N 11.1458°E
- Country: Norway
- Region: Central Norway
- County: Trøndelag
- District: Namdalen
- Municipality: Namsos Municipality
- Elevation: 31 m (102 ft)
- Time zone: UTC+01:00 (CET)
  - Summer (DST): UTC+02:00 (CEST)
- Post Code: 7777 Nord-Statland

Statland is a village in the western part of Namsos Municipality in Trøndelag county, Norway. The village lies along the Namsenfjorden, about 10 kilometres (6.2 mi) north of the village of Tøttdalen. The village has a school and Statland Church. The island of Otterøya lies across the fjord from Statland.
