= Kraftverkene i Øvre Namsen =

Power Stations

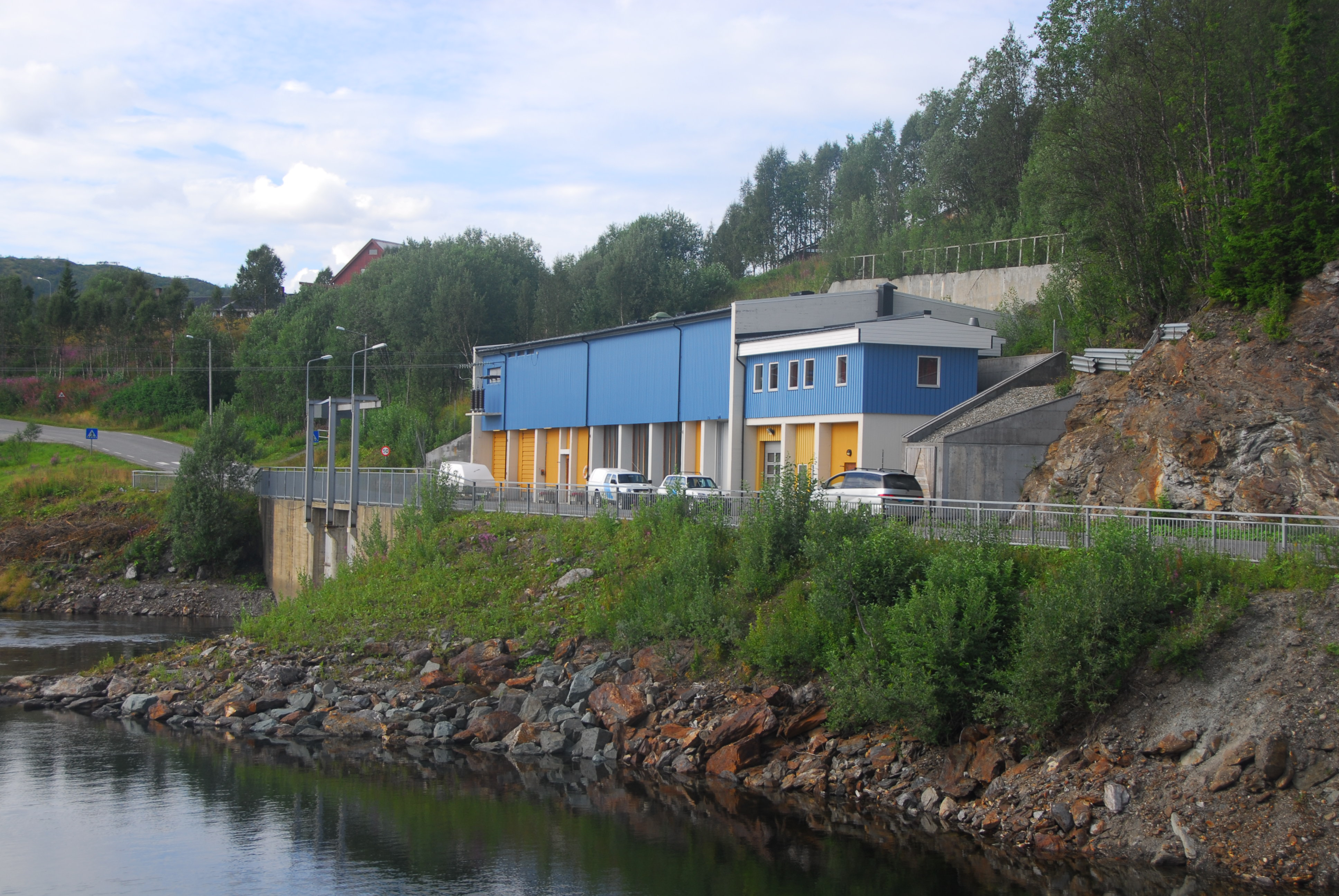
Røyrvikfoss Power Station

Kraftverkene i Øvre Namsen ("The Power Stations in Upper Namsen") or KØN was a joint venture between the Norwegian Water Resources and Energy Directorate (NVE) and Nord-Trøndelag Elektrisitetsverk (NTE). The venture started in 1958 and consisted of three wholly owned hydroelectric power stations in Norway and a partial ownership in one power station in Sweden, which opened between 1962 and 1965. With the establishment of Statkraft, the NVE's shares were transferred there. In 2004, NTE bought Statkraft's share, and the power production was incorporated into NTE's operations.

Power stations
| Power station | Municipality | Opened | Power (MW) | Average energy GWh/y |
|---|---|---|---|---|
| Linnvasselv | Strömsund Municipality, Sweden | 1962 | 12 | 48 |
| Tunnsjødal | Namsskogan Municipality, Norway | 1963 | 88 | 410 |
| Tunnsjø | Lierne Municipality, Norway | 1963 | 16 | 69 |
| Røyrvikfoss | Røyrvik Municipality, Norway | 1965 | 8 | 48 |
