= Statland Church =

Church in Trøndelag, Norway

- Statland kirke
- Statland Church
- 64.496620487°N 11.134574085°E
- Location: Namsos Municipality, Trøndelag
- Country: Norway
- Denomination: Church of Norway
- Churchmanship: Evangelical Lutheran

History
- Status: Parish church
- Founded: 1992
- Consecrated: 10 May 1992

Architecture
- Functional status: Active
- Architect: Reidar Moholdt
- Architectural type: Long church
- Completed: 1992 (34 years ago)

Specifications
- Capacity: 140
- Materials: Wood

Administration
- Diocese: Nidaros bispedømme
- Deanery: Namdal prosti
- Parish: Statland

Statland Church (Norwegian: Statland kirke) is a parish church of the Church of Norway in Namsos Municipality in Trøndelag county, Norway. It is located in the village of Statland. It is the church for the Statland parish which is part of the Namdal prosti (deanery) in the Diocese of Nidaros. The white, wooden church was built in a long church style in 1992 using plans drawn up by the architect Reidar Moholdt. The church seats about 140 people. The church was consecrated on 10 May 1992 by Bishop Finn Wagle.

== See also ==
- List of churches in Nidaros
