= Sjøåsen =

Village in Namsos Municipality, Norway

- Village
- Interactive map of Sjøåsen
- Location within Trøndelag Location within Norway
- Coordinates: 64.3084°N 11.2224°E
- Country: Norway
- Region: Central Norway
- County: Trøndelag
- District: Namdalen
- Municipality: Namsos Municipality
- Elevation: 6 m (20 ft)
- Time zone: UTC+01:00 (CET)
  - Summer (DST): UTC+02:00 (CEST)
- Post Code: 7750 Namdalseid

Sjøåsen is a village in Namsos Municipality in Trøndelag county, Norway. It is located at the mouth of the river Årgårdselva at the end of the Løgnin arm of the Namsenfjorden.

It is located along the Norwegian County Road 17 at the intersection with Norwegian County Road 766, which goes north to the neighboring Flatanger Municipality and Osen Municipality.
