= Sverkmoen =

Village in Namsos Municipality, Norway

- Farm area
- Interactive map of Sverkmoen
- Location within Trøndelag Location within Norway
- Coordinates: 64.2257°N 11.0795°E
- Country: Norway
- Region: Central Norway
- County: Trøndelag
- District: Namdalen
- Municipality: Namsos Municipality
- Elevation: 134 m (440 ft)
- Time zone: UTC+01:00 (CET)
  - Summer (DST): UTC+02:00 (CEST)
- Post Code: 7750 Namdalseid

Sverkmoen is a farming area in Namsos Municipality in Trøndelag county, Norway. It is west of the village of Namdalseid, between the lake Øyungen and the river Sverka which flows through a flat landscape covered with forests (Norwegian: mo).
