= Otterøy Church =

Church in Trøndelag, Norway

- Otterøy kirke
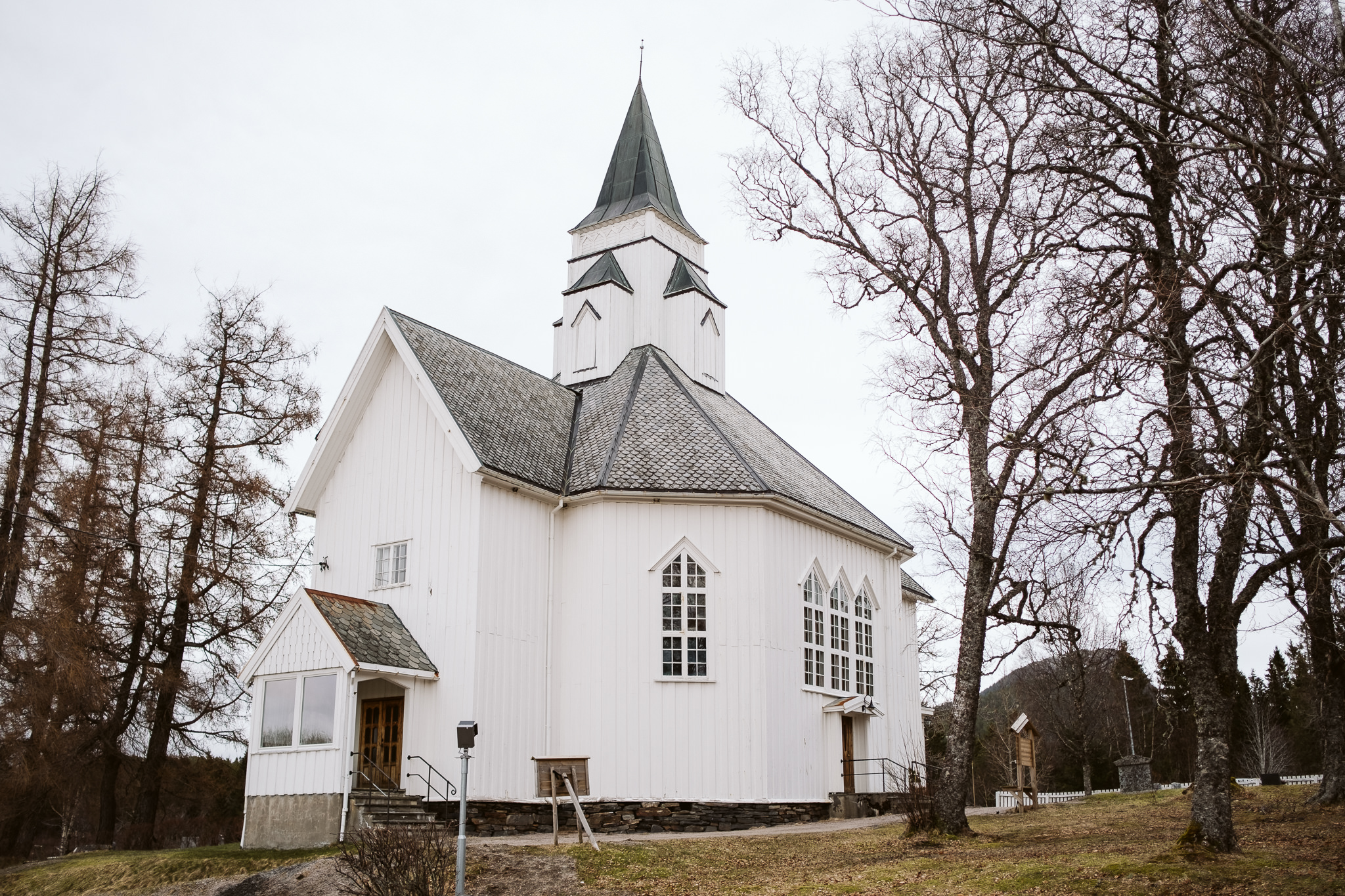
- View of the church
- Otterøy Church
- 64.5110°N 11.2983°E
- Location: Namsos Municipality, Trøndelag
- Country: Norway
- Denomination: Church of Norway
- Churchmanship: Evangelical Lutheran

History
- Former name: Vik kirke
- Status: Parish church
- Founded: 13th century
- Consecrated: 29 September 1858

Architecture
- Functional status: Active
- Architect: Christian Heinrich Grosch
- Architectural type: Octagonal
- Completed: 1858 (168 years ago)

Specifications
- Capacity: 350
- Materials: Wood

Administration
- Diocese: Nidaros bispedømme
- Deanery: Namdal prosti
- Parish: Otterøy
- Norwegian Cultural Heritage Site
- Type: Church
- Status: Listed
- ID: 85253

Otterøy Church (Norwegian: Otterøy kirke) is a parish church of the Church of Norway in Namsos Municipality in Trøndelag county, Norway. It is located in the village of Skomsvoll on the island of Otterøya. It is the church for the Otterøy parish which is part of the Namdal prosti (deanery) in the Diocese of Nidaros. The white, wooden church was built in an octagonal shape with a style reminiscent of the old stave churches. The building was constructed in 1858 using plans drawn up by the architect Christian Heinrich Grosch. The church seats about 350 people.

== History ==
The earliest existing historical records of the church date back to the year 1520, but the church was likely built in the early 1200s. The first church building was a probably a stave church and it was located at Vik, about 300 metres (980 ft) southwest of the present church site. Historically, the church was known as Vik Church until 1912 when it was renamed Otterøy Church. During the 1600s, the old church was torn down and replaced with a timber-framed long church on the same site.

In 1814, this church served as an election church (Norwegian: valgkirke). Together with more than 300 other parish churches across Norway, it was a polling station for elections to the 1814 Norwegian Constituent Assembly which wrote the Constitution of Norway. This was Norway's first national elections. Each church parish was a constituency that elected people called "electors" who later met together in each county to elect the representatives for the assembly that was to meet at Eidsvoll Manor later that year.

In 1858, a new church was built about 300 metres (980 ft) to the northeast of the old church site. The last worship service in the old church was held on 19 September 1858 and then on 29 September 1858 the new church was consecrated. Soon afterwards, the old church was torn down.

== See also ==
- List of churches in Nidaros
