= Namsenfjorden =

Fjord in Trøndelag, Norway

- Namsfjorden
- Interactive map of the fjord
- Location: Trøndelag county, Norway
- Coordinates: 64.4984°N 11.1973°E
- Type: Fjord
- Basin countries: Norway
- Max. length: 35 kilometres (22 mi)
- Max. width: 5 kilometres (3.1 mi)
- Settlements: Namsos

Namsenfjorden is a fjord in Trøndelag county, Norway. The 35-kilometre (22 mi) long fjord flows along the border between Namsos Municipality and Flatanger Municipality. It runs southeast from the Folda firth, between the mainland in the south and the island of Otterøya in the north, past the island of Hoddøya, to the Namsen river estuary in the town of Namsos. The banks of the fjord are mostly wooded and not very high. Near the town of Namsos, the Løgnin fjord arm branches to the south all the way to the village of Sjøåsen in Namsos Municipality. Other villages along the fjord include Statland, Tøttdalen, Skomsvoll, Bangsund, and Spillum.

== Media gallery ==
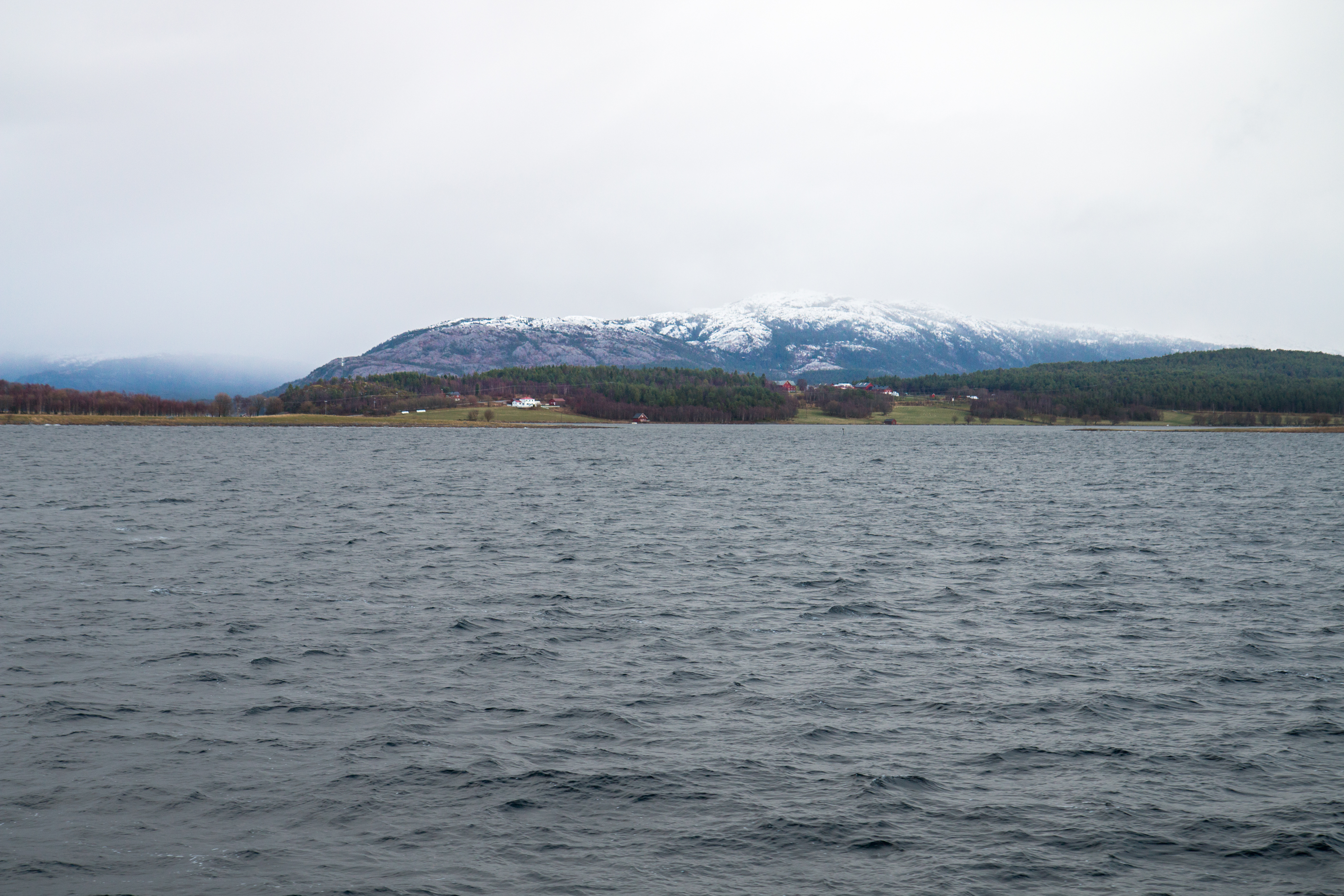
View of the fjord

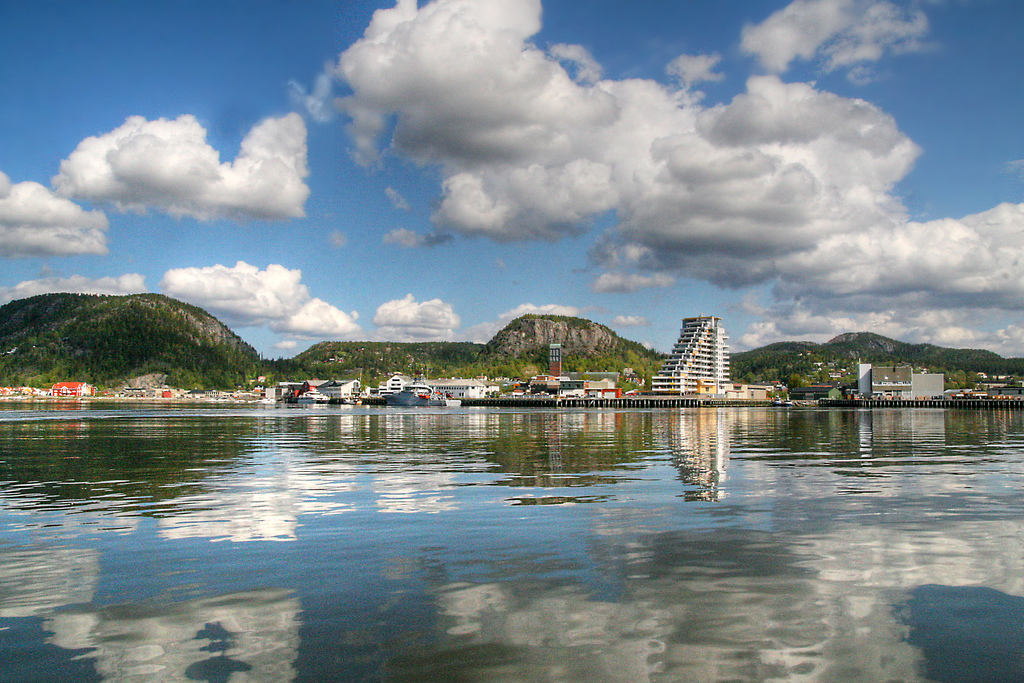
Town of Namsos

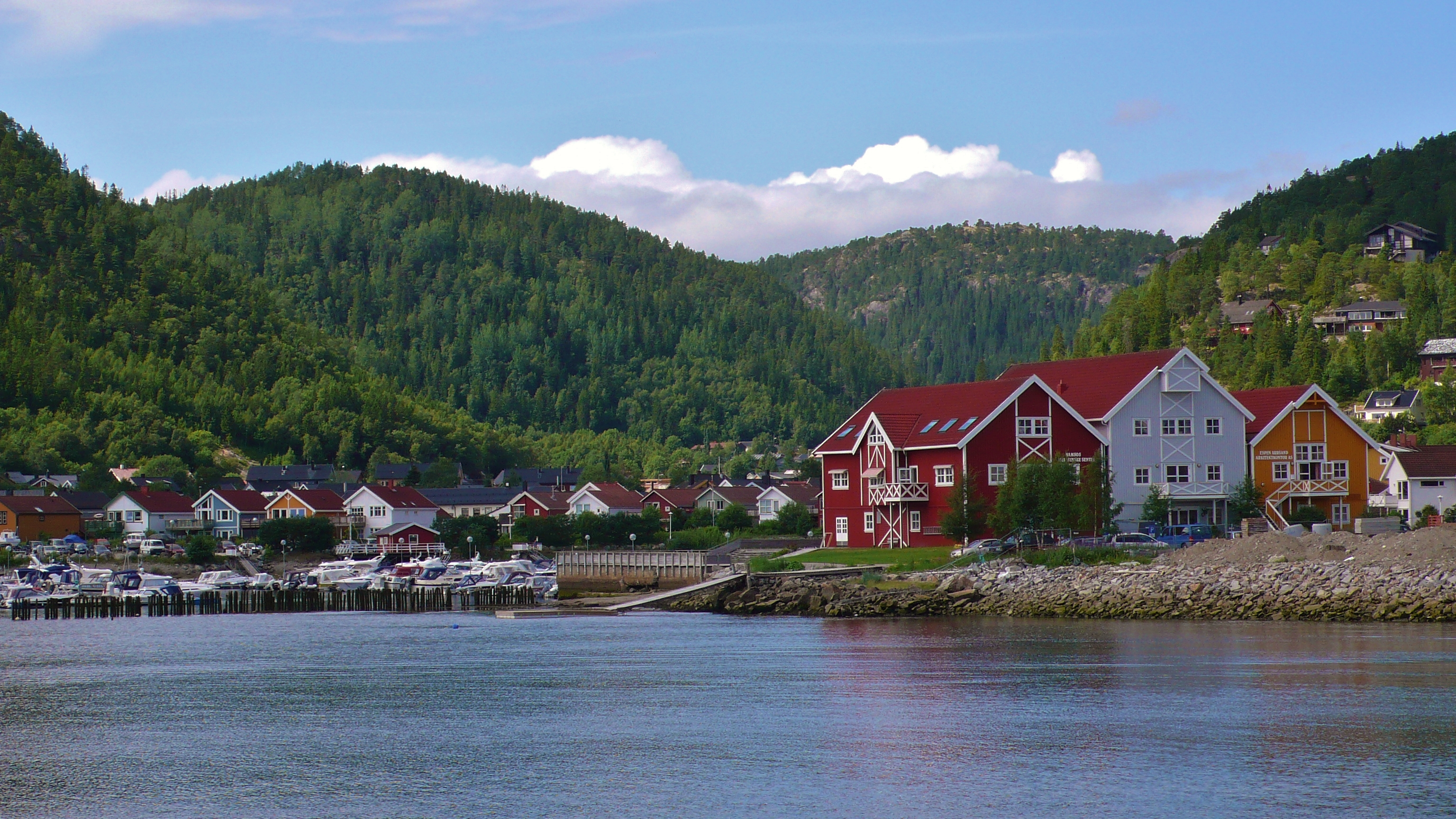
Town of Namsos

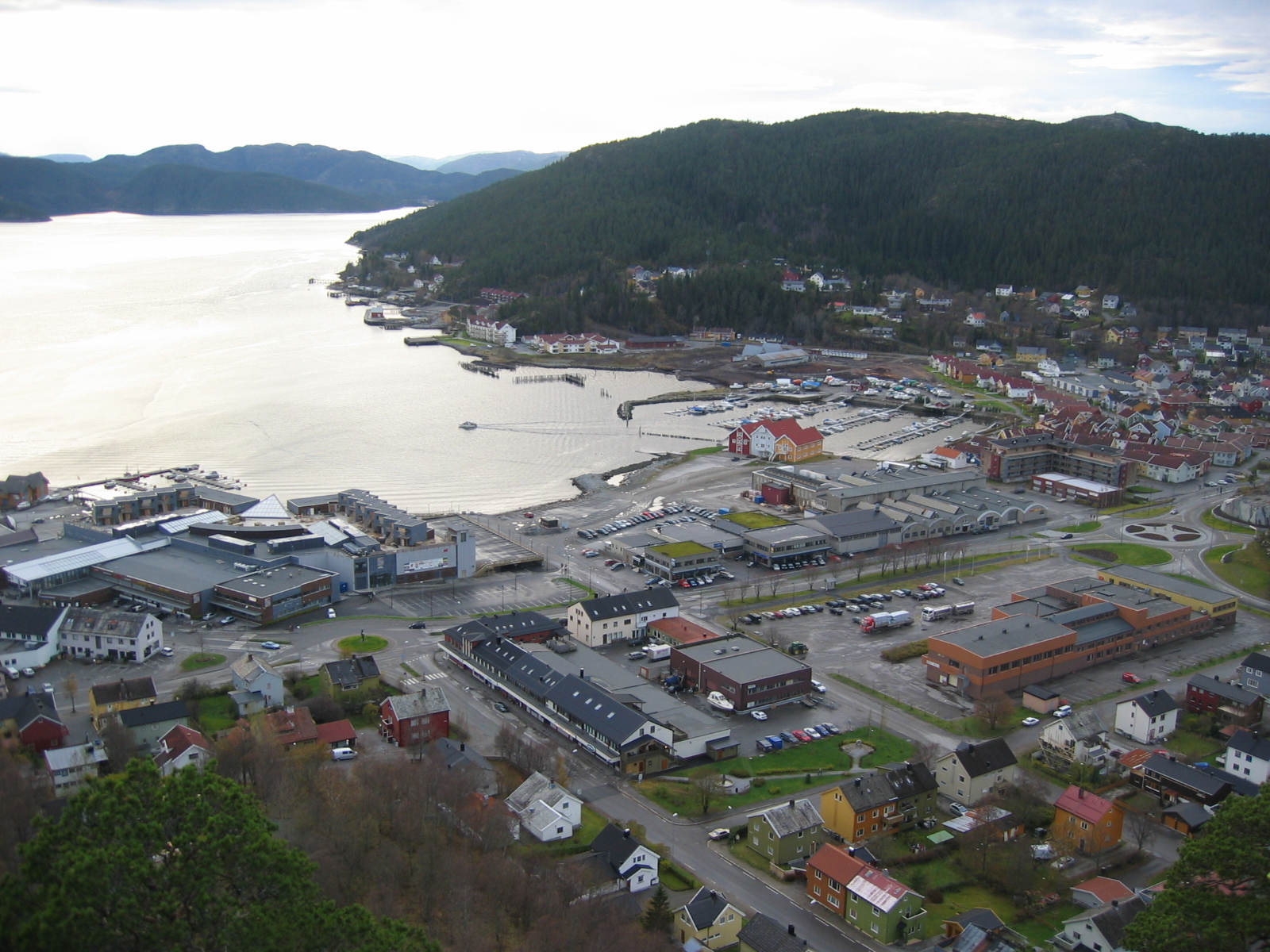
Town of Namsos

== See also ==
- List of Norwegian fjords
