= Otterøya =

Island in Trøndelag, Norway

Otterøya Otterøy
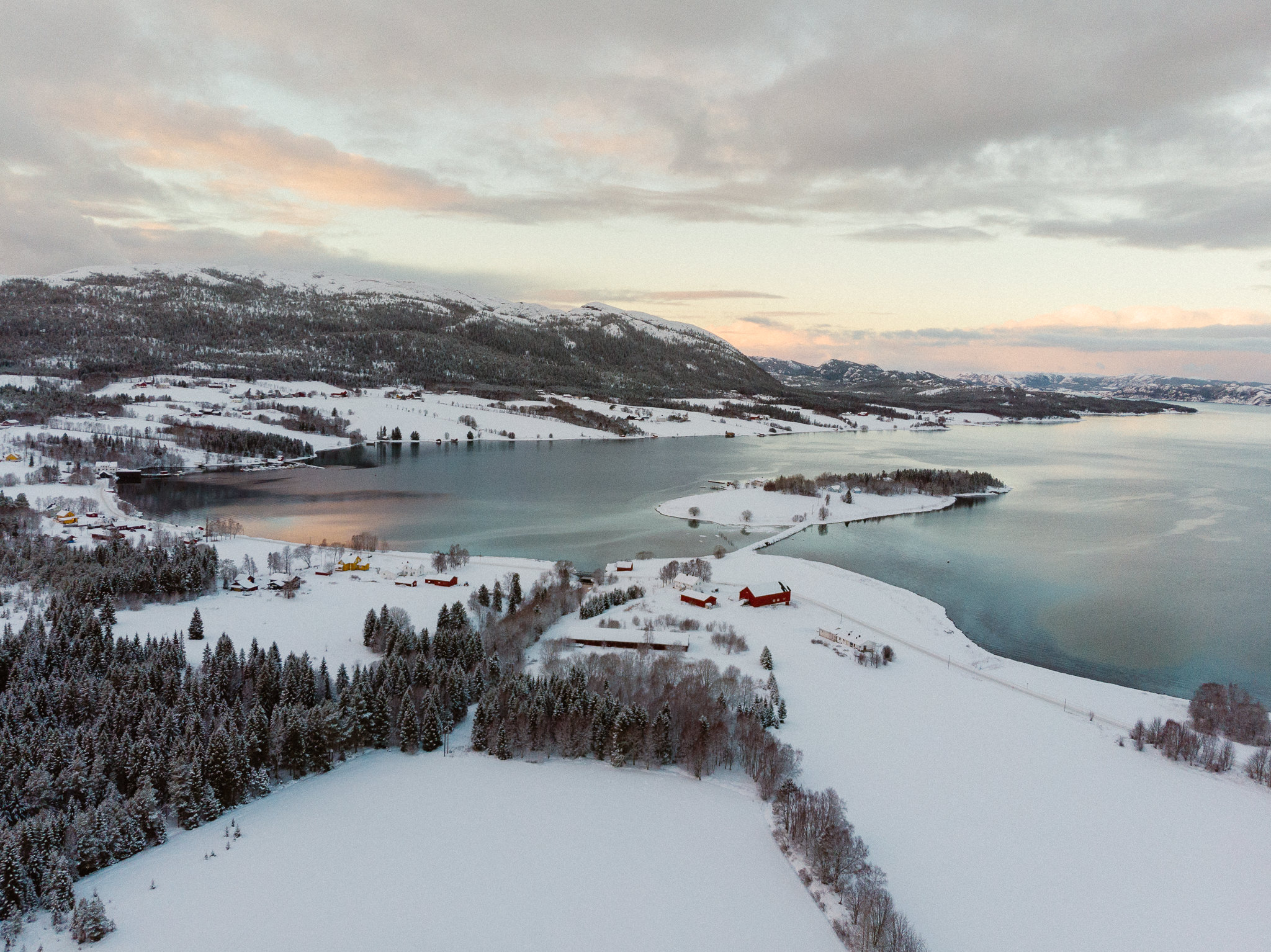
- Aerial view of Fosslandsosen on Otterøya
- Interactive map of Otterøya; Otterøy

Geography
- Location: Trøndelag, Norway
- Coordinates: 64.4918°N 11.3561°E
- Area: 143 km^{2} (55 sq mi)
- Length: 25 km (15.5 mi)
- Width: 6 km (3.7 mi)
- Highest elevation: 446 m (1463 ft)
- Highest point: Tømmervikfjellet

Administration
- Norway
- County: Trøndelag
- Municipality: Namsos Municipality

Demographics
- Population: 809 (2001)
- Pop. density: 5.7/km^{2} (14.8/sq mi)

Otterøya is an island in Namsos Municipality in Trøndelag county, Norway. The 143-square-kilometre (55 sq mi) island is the largest island in the northern part of Trøndelag county. Otterøya sits just to the northwest of the town of Namsos on the north side of the Namsenfjorden. It is connected to the mainland by the Lokkaren Bridge. The island was once governed by Otterøy Municipality and Fosnes Municipality, and became a part of Namsos Municipality in 1964. Otterøy Church is located on the island.

== Notable residents ==
- Idar Lind (born 1954), Norwegian writer

== See also ==
- List of islands of Norway by area
- List of islands of Norway
