= Klinga =

Klinga may refer to:

== People ==
- Klinga (surname), a list of people with the surname Klinga

== Places ==
- Klinga, Germany, a place in Saxony, Germany
- Klinga, Norway, a village in Namsos Municipality in Trøndelag county, Norway
- Klinga Municipality, a former municipality now part of Namsos Municipality in Trøndelag county, Norway
- Klinga Church, a church in Namsos Municipality in Trøndelag county, Norway

== See also ==
- Klingen (disambiguation)
