= Havig =

Havig is a surname. Notable people with the surname include:

- Christian Møinichen Havig (1825–1912), Norwegian bailiff and politician
- Dennis Havig (born 1949), American football player
- Fredrik Havig (1855–1927), Norwegian judge, mayor, and politician
- Jørgen Johannes Havig (1908–1883), Norwegian bailiff, farm owner, and politician
