= Klingen =

Klingen can refer to:

== Places ==
- Klinga, Norway, a village in Namsos Municipality in Trøndelag county, Norway
- Klinga Municipality, a former municipality now part of Namsos Municipality in Trøndelag county, Norway
- Klingen (Oberpfalz), a place near the small town of Hemau in Southern Germany

== Other ==
- Klingen, a Danish art magazine based in Copenhagen, Denmark

== See also ==
- Klinga (disambiguation)
