= Bangsund =

Village in Namsos Municipality, Norway

- Village
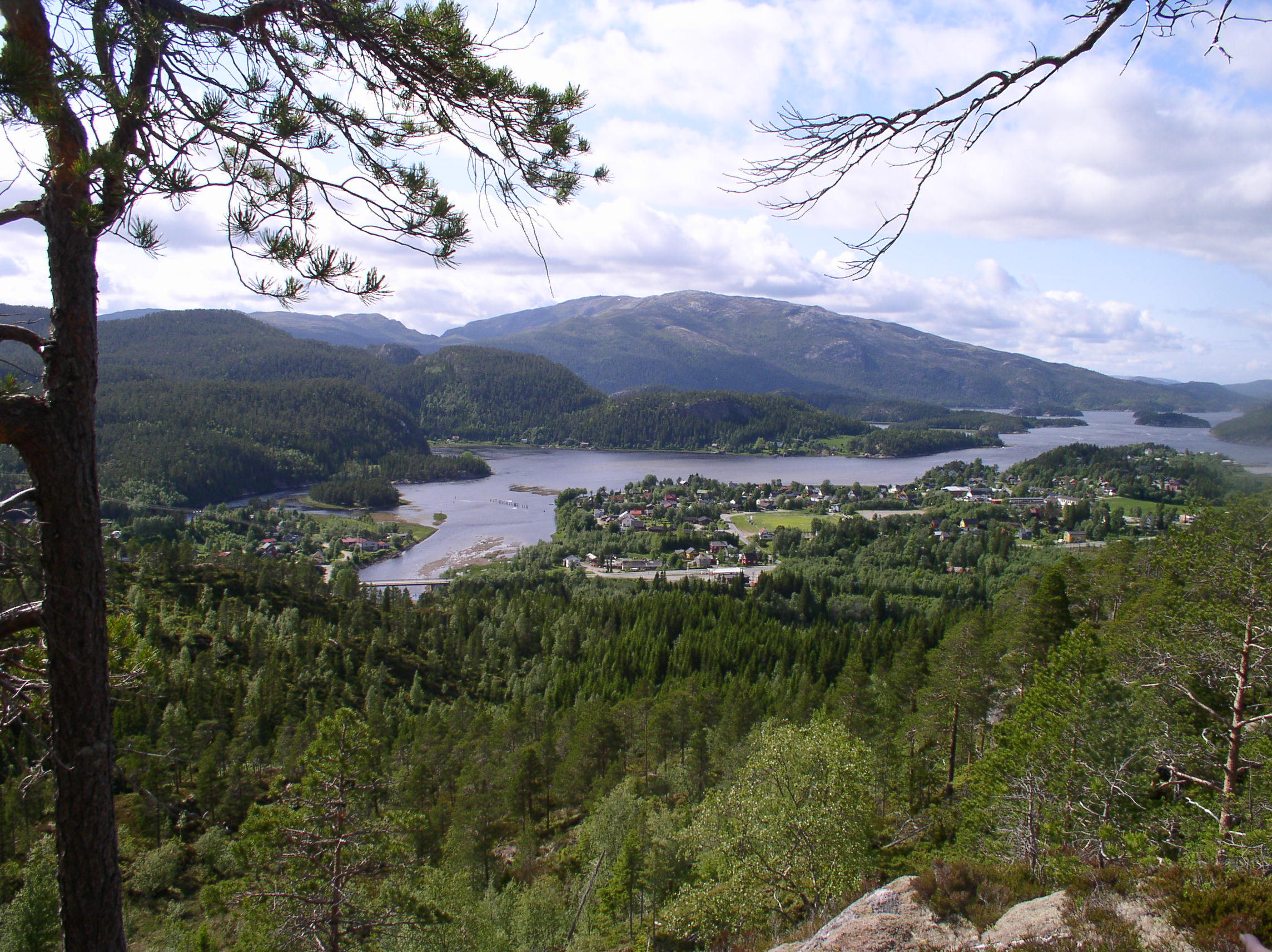
- View of the village
- Interactive map of Bangsund
- Location within Trøndelag Location within Norway
- Coordinates: 64.3923°N 11.3969°E
- Country: Norway
- Region: Central Norway
- County: Trøndelag
- District: Namdalen
- Municipality: Namsos Municipality

Area
  - Total: 0.66 km^{2} (0.25 sq mi)
- Elevation: 20 m (66 ft)

Population (2024)
  - Total: 865
  - Density: 1,311/km^{2} (3,400/sq mi)
- Time zone: UTC+01:00 (CET)
  - Summer (DST): UTC+02:00 (CEST)
- Post Code: 7822 Bangsund

Bangsund is a village Namsos Municipality in Trøndelag county, Norway. It lies along the Løgnin arm of the Namsenfjorden, about 15 kilometres (9.3 mi) south of the town of Namsos. The villages of Klinga and Sævik lie to the northeast along the Norwegian County Road 17.

The 0.66-square-kilometre (160-acre) village has a population (2024) of 865 and a population density of 1,311 inhabitants per square kilometre (3,400/sq mi).

== History ==
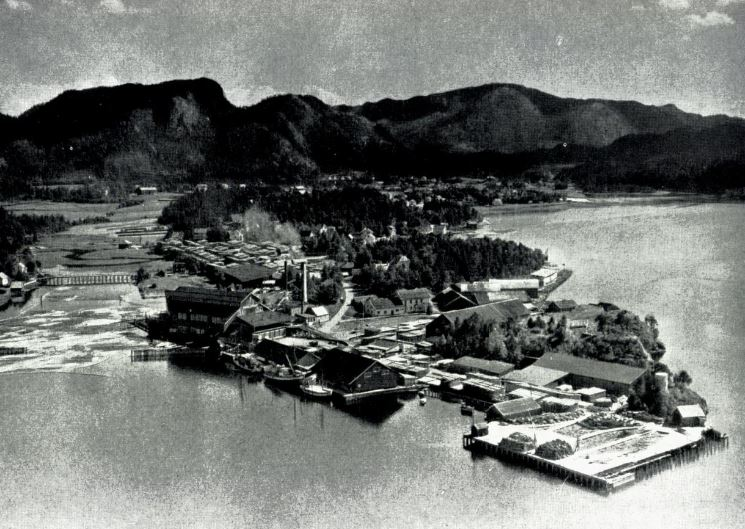
View of Bangsund c. 1957

Norsemen referred to it as "Icebound", even though there isn't much ice. Bangsund was originally an extremely old settlement. In 1886, a worker found a tombstone that dated back to about 500-600 AD.

The original farm was divided into two when its owner, Mickel Bangsund (1693-1774), divided the "farm" in 1770 for his sons; as Ole Mikelsen Bangsund got the southern half (or Bangsund-South) and Paul Mikelsen Bangsund got the northern half (or Bangsund-North). After the sons had kids and died off, the little farm started growing into a small town.

In 1781, Carl Olsen Bangsund (and two of his brothers; Mikkel Olsen Bangsund and Petter Olsen Bangsund) moved from the Bangsund Farm to Tromsø. The population at Bangsund in 1801 (according to the 1801 census) was 30 people.

The village of Bangsund was the administrative centre of the old Klinga Municipality which existed from 1891 until the dissolution of the municipality in 1964.

One of Bangsund's economic resources was the "Bangdalsbruket" sawmill. The mill burned to the ground in 1907 and was rebuilt in 1910. The sawmill was then used until 1980 and is said to have been one of the biggest sawmills in Northern Norway.
