= Sævik =

Village in Namsos Municipality, Norway

- Village
- Interactive map of Sævik
- Location within Trøndelag Location within Norway
- Coordinates: 64.4297°N 11.4938°E
- Country: Norway
- Region: Central Norway
- County: Trøndelag
- District: Namdalen
- Municipality: Namsos Municipality
- Elevation: 59 m (194 ft)
- Time zone: UTC+01:00 (CET)
  - Summer (DST): UTC+02:00 (CEST)
- Post Code: 7820 Spillum

Sævik is a small village in Namsos Municipality in Trøndelag county, Norway. The village was the site of the old Sævik Church until the mid-1800s. The village is located about half-way between the villages of Klinga and Spillum, along the Norwegian County Road 17. The town of Namsos lies about 5 kilometres (3.1 mi) to the north, on the other side of the river Namsen.

== History ==
Sævik had a church and was for many years the seat of a sub-parish (sokn). In the 16th century, Sævig (using the old spelling) was recorded as a part of Fosnes prestegjeld (parish). From 1820, it was part of the prestegjeld of Overhalla (not quite the same as the present-day Overhalla Municipality). There were churches in Sævik, Vemundvik (from 1844), and in Namsos (from 1859).

In 1859, Namsos became a parish of its own. The parish of Sævik was split in 1859, so that the northern part (Vemundvik) remained with Overhalla, and Sævik became a parish of its own.

In 1866, a new church was built in the village of Klinga, about 2.7 kilometres (1.7 mi) south of Sævik and the old church in Sævik was torn down. In May 1885, the parish changed its name from Sævig to Klingen since that's where the church was presently located.
