= Vemundvik =

Village in Namsos Municipality, Norway

- Village
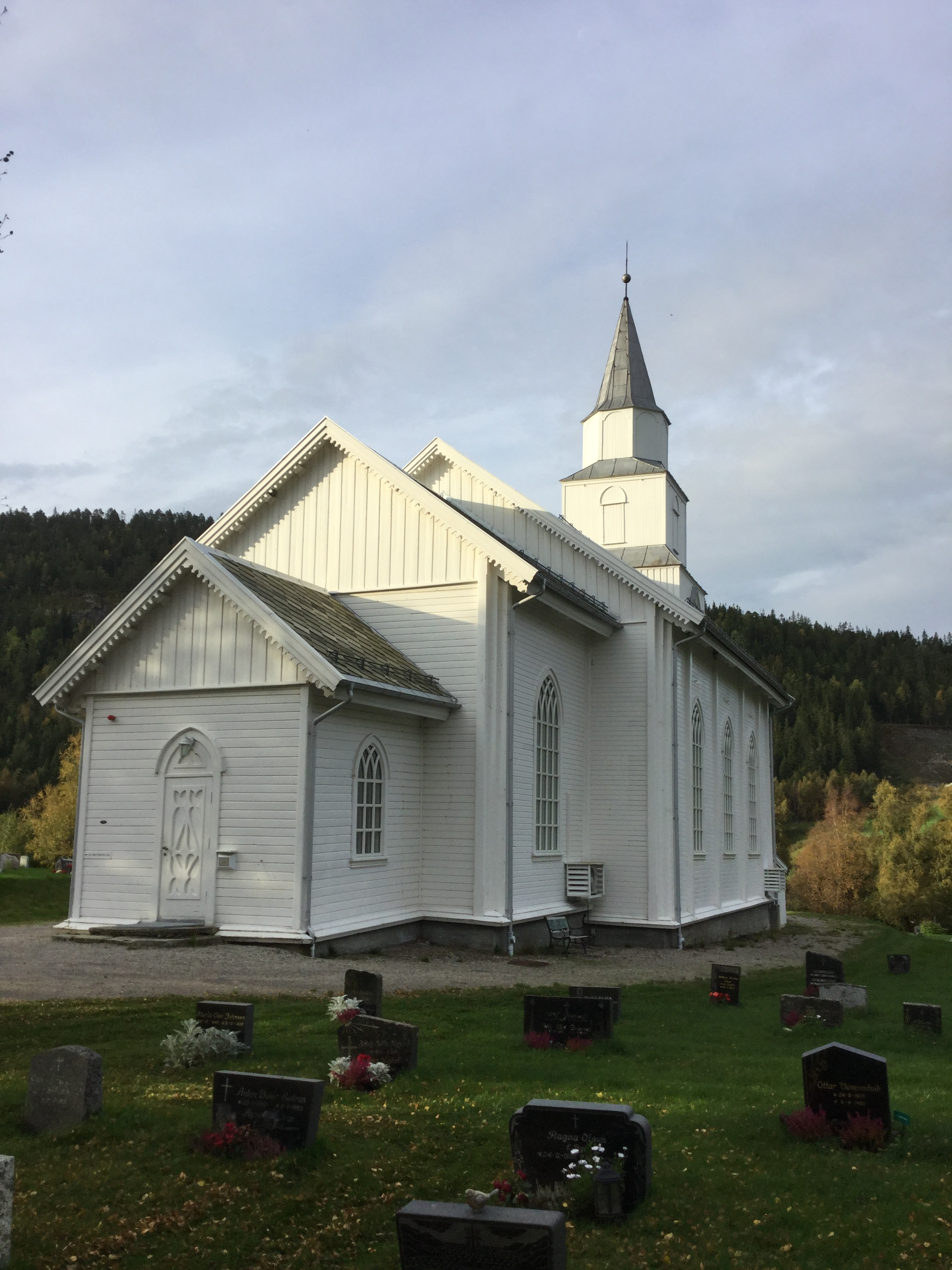
- View of the village church, Vemundvik Church
- Interactive map of Vemundvik
- Location within Trøndelag Location within Norway
- Coordinates: 64.5177°N 11.5420°E
- Country: Norway
- Region: Central Norway
- County: Trøndelag
- District: Namdalen
- Municipality: Namsos Municipality
- Elevation: 31 m (102 ft)
- Time zone: UTC+01:00 (CET)
  - Summer (DST): UTC+02:00 (CEST)
- Post Code: 7810 Namsos

Vemundvik is a village in Namsos Municipality in Trøndelag county, Norway. The village is located along the sea shore, about 10 kilometres (6.2 mi) north of the town of Namsos and about 3 kilometres (1.9 mi) east of the village of Ramsvika. Vemundvik Church is located in the village.

The village of Vemundvik was the administrative centre of the old Vemundvik Municipality from 1838 until 1941, when the municipal administration moved to the nearby town of Namsos.

== Name ==
The village (originally the parish) is named after the old Vemundvik farm (Old Norse: Vémundarvík) since the first Vemundvik Church was built there. The first element is an old male name Vémundr or the more modern version, Vemund. The last element is vík which means "bay" or "inlet".

== Notable people ==
Notable people that were born or lived in Vemundvik include:

- Jørgen Johannes Havig (1808–1883), a Norwegian politician
