= Vemundvik Municipality =

Former municipality in Trøndelag, Norway

Vemundvik Municipality Vemundvik herred
- Former municipality
- Namsos herred (historic name)
- Nord-Trøndelag within Norway

- Vemundvik within Nord-Trøndelag
- Coordinates: 64°31′03″N 11°32′31″E
- Country: Norway
- County: Nord-Trøndelag
- District: Namdalen
- Established: 1 Jan 1838
  - Created as: Formannskapsdistrikt
- Disestablished: 1 Jan 1964
  - Succeeded by: Namsos Municipality
- Administrative centre: Vemundvik (1838-1941); Town of Namsos (1941-1964)

Government
  - Mayor (1951–1963): Peder Myrvold (Ap)

Area (upon dissolution)
  - Total: 238.9 km^{2} (92.2 sq mi)
  - Rank: #337 in Norway
- Highest elevation: 648 m (2,126 ft)

Population (1963)
  - Total: 1,943
  - Rank: #445 in Norway
  - Density: 8.1/km^{2} (21/sq mi)
  - Change (10 years): ▲ +10.1%
- Demonym: Vemundvik-folk

Official language
  - Norwegian form: Nynorsk
- Time zone: UTC+01:00 (CET)
  - Summer (DST): UTC+02:00 (CEST)
- ISO 3166 code: NO-1745

Vemundvik is a former municipality in the old Nord-Trøndelag county, Norway. The 247-square-kilometre (95 sq mi) municipality existed from 1838 until its dissolution in 1964 (although it was originally much larger in 1838). By 1964, the municipality roughly corresponded to the mainland areas north of the river Namsen in what is now Namsos Municipality in Trøndelag county. From 1838 until about 1942, the administrative centre was the village of Vemundvik where Vemundvik Church is located. After 1941, the municipal offices and administration was headquartered in the town of Namsos (which was technically not part of the municipality).

Prior to its dissolution in 1963, the 239-square-kilometre (92 sq mi) municipality was the 337th largest by area out of the 689 municipalities in Norway. Vemundvik Municipality was the 445th most populous municipality in Norway with a population of about 1,943. The municipality's population density was 8.1 inhabitants per square kilometre (21/sq mi) and its population had increased by 10.1% over the previous 10-year period.

== General information ==
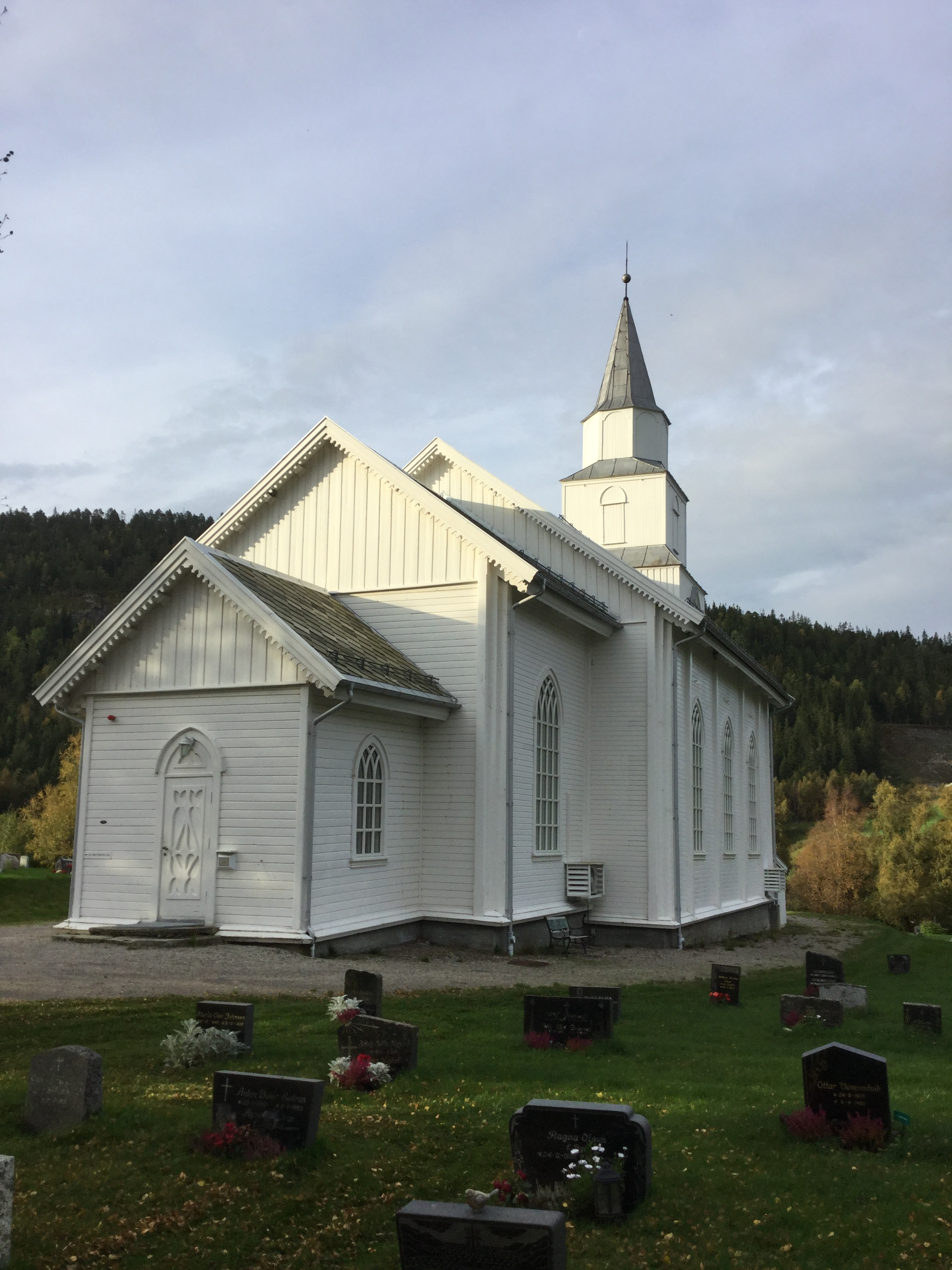
Vemundvik Church

The parish of Vemundvik was established as a municipality on 1 January 1838 (see formannskapsdistrikt law). In 1846, the village of Namsos was declared to be a ladested, which mean that it was removed from Vemundvik Municipality. The new town (Ladested Namsos) had 591 inhabitants and the rest of Vemundvik Municipality was renamed Namsos herred or Namsos landdistrikt and it had 908 residents after the split.

On 1 January 1891, the southern district of the Namsos herred municipality (population: 1,387) was separated to become the new Klingen Municipality and the remaining northern district (population: 1,088) was renamed Vemundvik Municipality (bringing back the old name for the area).

Areas of Vemundvik lying adjacent to the town of Namsos were later annexed by the town on numerous occasions. On 1 January 1882, an area with 109 inhabitants was moved to the town. On 1 July 1921 an area with 927 inhabitants was again transferred to Namsos. Then, on 1 July 1957, another area with a population of 6 was transferred to Namsos.

During the 1960s, there were many municipal mergers across Norway due to the work of the Schei Committee. On 1 January 1964, a large municipal merger took place with the following areas being merged into a new, larger Namsos Municipality with 10,875 residents.

- all of the town of Namsos (population: 5,224)
- all of Vemundvik Municipality (population: 2,040)
- all of Klinga Municipality (population: 2,482)
- the parts of Otterøy Municipality located north of the Namsenfjorden (population: 1,013)
- the Finnangerodden area on the island of Otterøya in Fosnes Municipality (population: 116)

=== Name ===
The municipality (originally the parish) is named after the old Vemundvik farm (Old Norse: Vémundarvík) since the first Vemundvik Church was built there. The first element is an old male name Vémundr or the more modern version, Vemund. The last element is vík which means "bay" or "inlet".

=== Churches ===
The Church of Norway had one parish (sokn) within Vemundvik Municipality. At the time of the municipal dissolution, it was part of the Namsos prestegjeld and the Indre Namdal prosti (deanery) in the Diocese of Nidaros.

Churches in Vemundvik Municipality
Parish (sokn)	Church name	Location of the church	Year built
Vemundvik	Vemundvik Church	Vemundvik	1875

== Geography ==
The highest point in the municipality was the 648-metre (2,126 ft) tall mountain Vetterhushatten on the border with Overhalla Municipality to the southeast. The municipality was located to the northeast of the town of Namsos. Fosnes Municipality was located to the north, Overhalla Municipality was to the east and southeast, the town of Namsos and Klinga Municipality were located to the south, and Otterøy Municipality was located to the west.

== Government ==
While it existed, Vemundvik Municipality was responsible for primary education (through 10th grade), outpatient health services, senior citizen services, welfare and other social services, zoning, economic development, and municipal roads and utilities. The municipality was governed by a municipal council of directly elected representatives. The mayor was indirectly elected by a vote of the municipal council. The municipality was under the jurisdiction of the Frostating Court of Appeal.

=== Municipal council ===
The municipal council (Herredsstyre) of Vemundvik Municipality was made up of 13 representatives that were elected to four year terms. The tables below show the historical composition of the council by political party.

Vemundvik heradsstyre 1959–1963
Party name (in Nynorsk)	Number of representatives
Labour Party (Arbeidarpartiet)	8
Conservative Party (Høgre)	1
Christian Democratic Party (Kristeleg Folkeparti)	1
Centre Party (Senterpartiet)	2
Liberal Party (Venstre)	1
Total number of members:	13
Note: On 1 January 1964, Vemundvik Municipality became part of Namsos Municipality.

Vemundvik heradsstyre 1955–1959
Party name (in Nynorsk)	Number of representatives
Labour Party (Arbeidarpartiet)	8
Conservative Party (Høgre)	1
Christian Democratic Party (Kristeleg Folkeparti)	1
Farmers' Party (Bondepartiet)	2
Liberal Party (Venstre)	1
Total number of members:	13

Vemundvik heradsstyre 1951–1955
Party name (in Nynorsk)	Number of representatives
Labour Party (Arbeidarpartiet)	7
Conservative Party (Høgre)	1
Christian Democratic Party (Kristeleg Folkeparti)	1
Farmers' Party (Bondepartiet)	2
Liberal Party (Venstre)	1
Total number of members:	12

Vemundvik heradsstyre 1947–1951
Party name (in Nynorsk)	Number of representatives
Labour Party (Arbeidarpartiet)	5
Communist Party (Kommunistiske Parti)	1
Farmers' Party (Bondepartiet)	4
Liberal Party (Venstre)	2
Total number of members:	12

Vemundvik heradsstyre 1945–1947
Party name (in Nynorsk)	Number of representatives
Labour Party (Arbeidarpartiet)	6
Communist Party (Kommunistiske Parti)	1
Joint List(s) of Non-Socialist Parties (Borgarlege Felleslister)	5
Total number of members:	12

Vemundvik heradsstyre 1937–1941*
Party name (in Nynorsk)	Number of representatives
Labour Party (Arbeidarpartiet)	6
Farmers' Party (Bondepartiet)	3
Liberal Party (Venstre)	3
Total number of members:	12
Note: Due to the German occupation of Norway during World War II, no elections were held for new municipal councils until after the war ended in 1945.

=== Mayors ===
The mayor (Nynorsk: ordførar) of Vemundvik Municipality was the political leader of the municipality and the chairperson of the municipal council. Here is a list of people who held this position:

- 1838–1841: Hans Tetlie
- 1842–1843: Andreas Samuelsen Vibstad
- 1844–1845: Halle E. Gansmo
- 1846–1849: Mathias A. Sellæg
- 1850–1851: Ove Christian Roll
- 1851–1853: Mathias A. Sellæg
- 1854–1855: Johan A. Sellæg
- 1856–1859: J.G. Steen
- 1860–1861: Halle E. Tetlie
- 1862–1867: Ole Steendahl
- 1868–1875: Johannes Havig
- 1876–1883: Nils Bjørum
- 1884–1893: Anton Ganæs (V)
- 1894–1904: Normann Nilsen (V)
- 1905–1919: Johan Hals (V)
- 1920–1922: Neumann Thorsen (Ap/NSA)
- 1923–1928: Johan Lervik (Bp)
- 1929–1934: Amund Grande (Bp)
- 1935–1937: Jarle Hildrum (Bp)
- 1938–1941: Olav Benum (V)
- 1942–1945: Wilhelm Hals (NS)
- 1945–1945: Olav Benum (V)
- 1946–1947: Peder Myrvold (Ap)
- 1948–1951: Jarle Hildrum (Bp)
- 1951–1963: Peder Myrvold (Ap)

== See also ==
- List of former municipalities of Norway
