= Klinga Municipality =

Former municipality in Trøndelag, Norway

Klinga Municipality Klinga herred
- Former municipality
- Klingen herred (historic name)
- Nord-Trøndelag within Norway

- Klinga within Nord-Trøndelag
- Coordinates: 64°24′35″N 11°28′56″E
- Country: Norway
- County: Nord-Trøndelag
- District: Namdalen
- Established: 1 Jan 1891
  - Preceded by: Vemundvik Municipality
- Disestablished: 1 Jan 1964
  - Succeeded by: Namsos Municipality
- Administrative centre: Bangsund

Government
  - Mayor (1962–1963): Alf Derås (Ap)

Area (upon dissolution)
  - Total: 352 km^{2} (136 sq mi)
  - Rank: #252 in Norway
- Highest elevation: 680.5 m (2,233 ft)

Population (1963)
  - Total: 2,466
  - Rank: #370 in Norway
  - Density: 7/km^{2} (18/sq mi)
  - Change (10 years): ▲ +6.1%
- Demonym: Klingbygg

Official language
  - Norwegian form: Neutral
- Time zone: UTC+01:00 (CET)
  - Summer (DST): UTC+02:00 (CEST)
- ISO 3166 code: NO-1746

Klinga is a former municipality in the old Nord-Trøndelag county, Norway. The 352-square-kilometre (136 sq mi) municipality existed from 1891 until its dissolution in 1964. The municipality encompassed the mainland areas south of the river Namsen in what is now Namsos Municipality in Trøndelag county. The administrative centre was the village of Bangsund. Other villages in Klinga included Spillum and Klinga where Klinga Church is located.

Prior to its dissolution in 1963, the 352-square-kilometre (136 sq mi) municipality was the 252nd largest by area out of the 689 municipalities in Norway. Klinga Municipality was the 370th most populous municipality in Norway with a population of about 2,466. The municipality's population density was 7 inhabitants per square kilometre (18/sq mi) and its population had increased by 6.1% over the previous 10-year period.

== General information ==
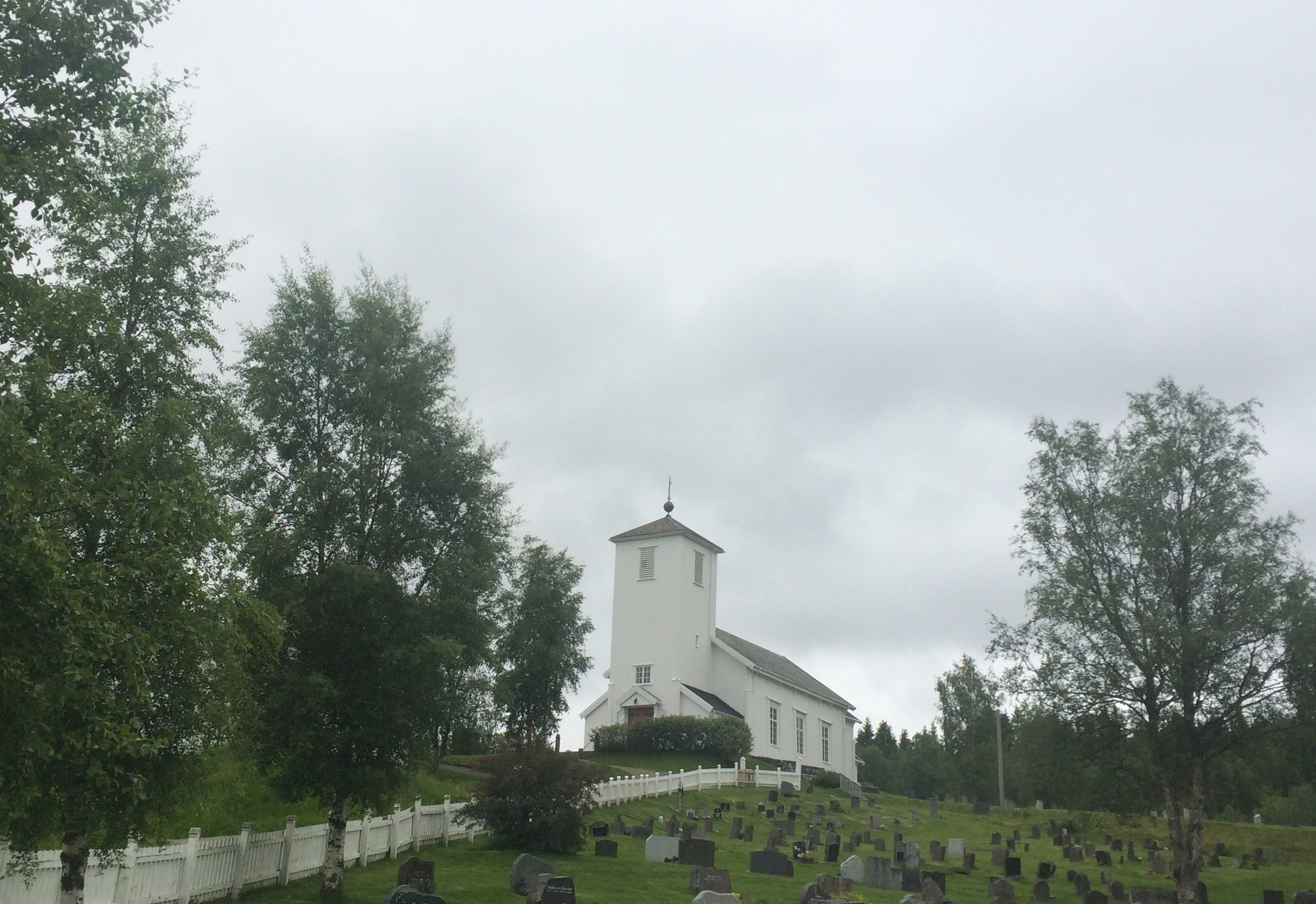
Klinga Church

The municipality of Klingen was established on 1 January 1891 when the municipality of Namsos herred was divided in two. The northern part became Vemundvik Municipality (population: 1,387) and the southern part became Klingen Municipality (population: 1,387). In 1917, the spelling of the name was changed to Klinga Municipality.

During the 1960s, there were many municipal mergers across Norway due to the work of the Schei Committee. On 1 January 1964, a large municipal merger took place with the following areas being merged into a new, larger Namsos Municipality with 10,875 residents.

- all of the town of Namsos (population: 5,224)
- all of Klinga Municipality (population: 2,482)
- all of Vemundvik Municipality (population: 2,040)
- the parts of Otterøy Municipality located north of the Namsenfjorden (population: 1,013)
- the Finnangerodden area on the island of Otterøya in Fosnes Municipality (population: 116)

=== Name ===
The municipality (originally the parish) is named after the old Klingen farm. The name is a form of the Old Norse word kringla which means "circle" or "orb". This name likely refers to the round-shaped mountain located behind the farm site. Historically, the name of the municipality was spelled Klingen. On 3 November 1917, a royal resolution changed the spelling of the name of the municipality to Klinga.

=== Churches ===
The Church of Norway had one parish (sokn) within Klinga Municipality. At the time of the municipal dissolution, it was part of the Namsos prestegjeld and the Indre Namdal prosti (deanery) in the Diocese of Nidaros.

Churches in Klinga Municipality
Parish (sokn)	Church name	Location of the church	Year built
Klinga	Klinga Church	Klinga	1866

== Geography ==
The highest point in the municipality was the 680.5-metre (2,233 ft) tall mountain Hemnafjellet on the border with Otterøy Municipality. The municipality is located at the inner end of the Namsenfjorden. Namdalseid Municipality was located to the west, Otterøy Municipality was located to the northwest, the town of Namsos and Vemundvik Municipality were both located to the north, Overhalla Municipality was located to the east, and Kvam Municipality was located to the south.

== Government ==
While it existed, Klinga Municipality was responsible for primary education (through 10th grade), outpatient health services, senior citizen services, welfare and other social services, zoning, economic development, and municipal roads and utilities. The municipality was governed by a municipal council of directly elected representatives. The mayor was indirectly elected by a vote of the municipal council. The municipality was under the jurisdiction of the Frostating Court of Appeal.

=== Municipal council ===
The municipal council (Herredsstyre) of Klinga Municipality was made up of 15 representatives that were elected to four year terms. The tables below show the historical composition of the council by political party.

Klinga herredsstyre 1959–1963
Party name (in Norwegian)	Number of representatives
Labour Party (Arbeiderpartiet)	10
Communist Party (Kommunistiske Parti)	1
Christian Democratic Party (Kristelig Folkeparti)	1
Centre Party (Senterpartiet)	1
Joint List(s) of Non-Socialist Parties (Borgerlige Felleslister)	2
Total number of members:	15
Note: On 1 January 1964, Klinga Municipality became part of Namsos Municipality.

Klinga herredsstyre 1955–1959
Party name (in Norwegian)	Number of representatives
Labour Party (Arbeiderpartiet)	9
Communist Party (Kommunistiske Parti)	1
Christian Democratic Party (Kristelig Folkeparti)	1
List of workers, fishermen, and small farmholders (Arbeidere, fiskere, småbrukere liste)	1
Joint List(s) of Non-Socialist Parties (Borgerlige Felleslister)	3
Total number of members:	15

Klinga herredsstyre 1951–1955
Party name (in Norwegian)	Number of representatives
Labour Party (Arbeiderpartiet)	6
Communist Party (Kommunistiske Parti)	1
Christian Democratic Party (Kristelig Folkeparti)	1
List of workers, fishermen, and small farmholders (Arbeidere, fiskere, småbrukere liste)	2
Local List(s) (Lokale lister)	2
Total number of members:	12

Klinga herredsstyre 1947–1951
Party name (in Norwegian)	Number of representatives
Labour Party (Arbeiderpartiet)	6
Communist Party (Kommunistiske Parti)	2
Christian Democratic Party (Kristelig Folkeparti)	1
Joint List(s) of Non-Socialist Parties (Borgerlige Felleslister)	3
Total number of members:	12

Klinga herredsstyre 1945–1947
Party name (in Norwegian)	Number of representatives
Labour Party (Arbeiderpartiet)	7
Communist Party (Kommunistiske Parti)	2
Joint List(s) of Non-Socialist Parties (Borgerlige Felleslister)	3
Total number of members:	12

Klinga herredsstyre 1937–1941*
Party name (in Norwegian)	Number of representatives
Labour Party (Arbeiderpartiet)	8
Joint List(s) of Non-Socialist Parties (Borgerlige Felleslister)	4
Total number of members:	12
Note: Due to the German occupation of Norway during World War II, no elections were held for new municipal councils until after the war ended in 1945.

=== Mayors ===
The mayor (Norwegian: ordfører) of Klinga Municipality was the political leader of the municipality and the chairperson of the municipal council. Here is a list of people who held this position:

- 1891–1907: Halvdan Romstad (V)
- 1908–1913: Eirik Spillum (LL)
- 1914–1916: Karl Klingen (Rp)
- 1917–1922: Ole Schiefloe (LL)
- 1923–1925: Nils Christian Pehrson (Ap)
- 1926–1939: Martin Tørring (Ap)
- 1940–1954: Konrad Aagesen (Ap)
- 1955–1955: Arne Kvam (Ap)
- 1956–1961: Sverre Lindseth (Ap)
- 1962–1963: Alf Derås (Ap)

== See also ==
- List of former municipalities of Norway
