= Norwegian Sawmill Museum =

Museum in Trøndelag county, Norway

Coordinates: 64°26′56″N 11°30′45″E

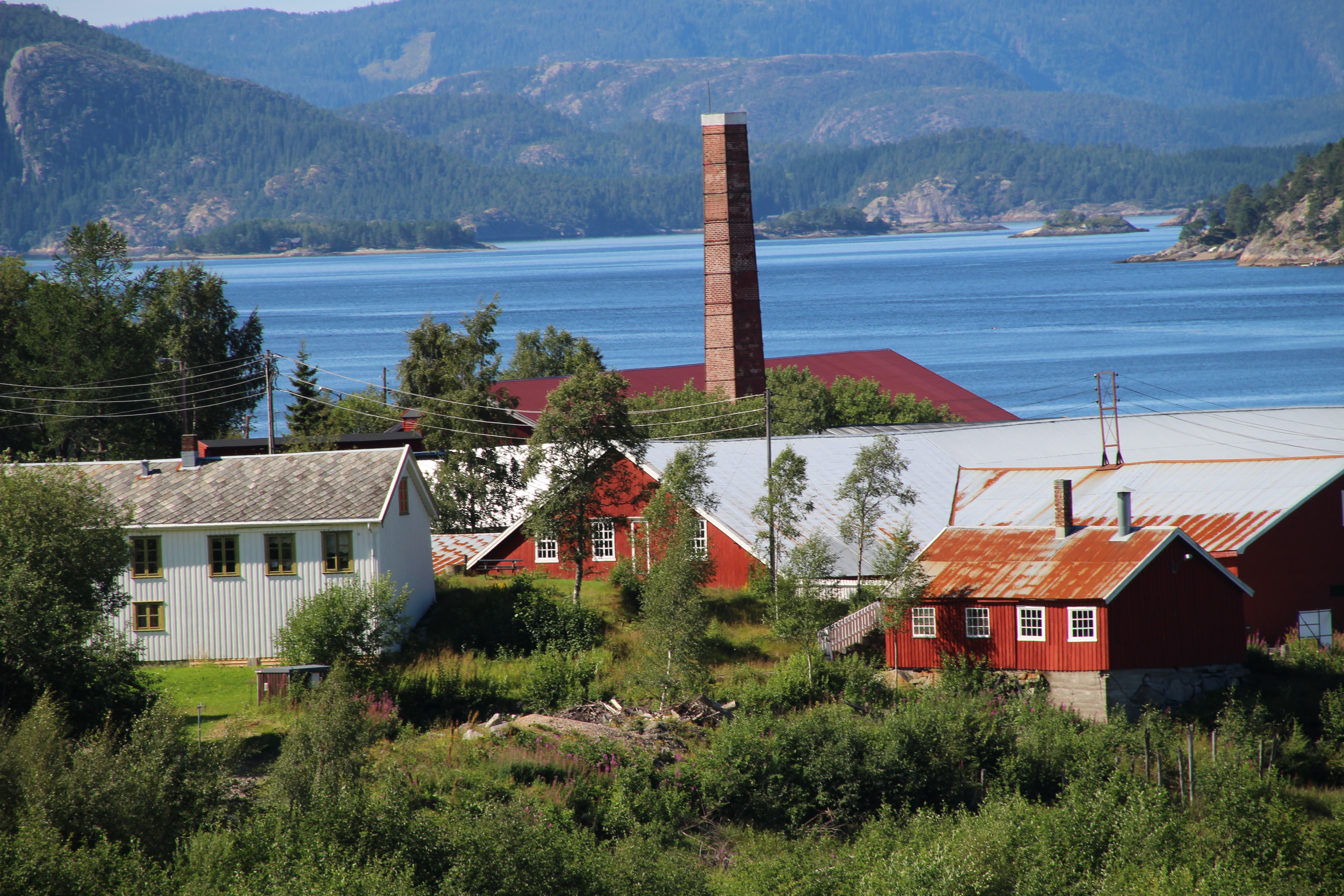
Norwegian Sawmill Museum

The Norwegian Sawmill Museum (Norwegian: Norsk Sagbruksmuseum) is a museum located in the village of Spillum in Namsos Municipality in Trøndelag county, Norway. The town of Namsos lies just to the north, across the river Namsen. The museum opened in 1991 at the site of the former sawmill operated by Spillum Sawmill & Planing (Spillum Dampsag & Høvleri).

== History ==
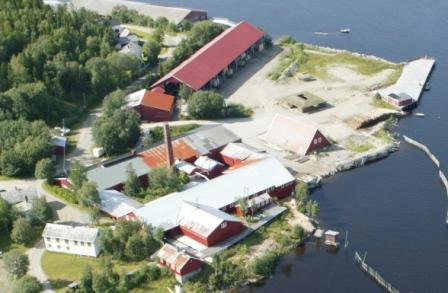
Spillum Dampsag & Hovleri

The Norwegian sawmill industry was, around the start of the 19th century, one of Norway's largest industries with several hundred steam powered sawmills. Spillum Sawmill and Planing is the last preserved sawmill from this period and tells the story about the national sawmill history. The Sawmill Museum is today one out of four departments at the regional museum, ”Museet Midt”. The three other departments are The Coast Museum in northern Trøndelag, Namdal Museum, and Nord-Trøndelag County Gallery. As well as the technical-industrial cultural environment at Spillum Sawmill & Planing, The Norwegian Sawmill Museum manages the tugboats ”MB Hauka” and "MB Oter" and a collection of objects from the national history of sawmills, displaying sawmill equipment from most of the country's regions. The Norwegian Sawmill Museum has a staff of about 11 employees. The staff run the museum from the facilities at the sawmill.

== Spillum Sawmill & Planing ==
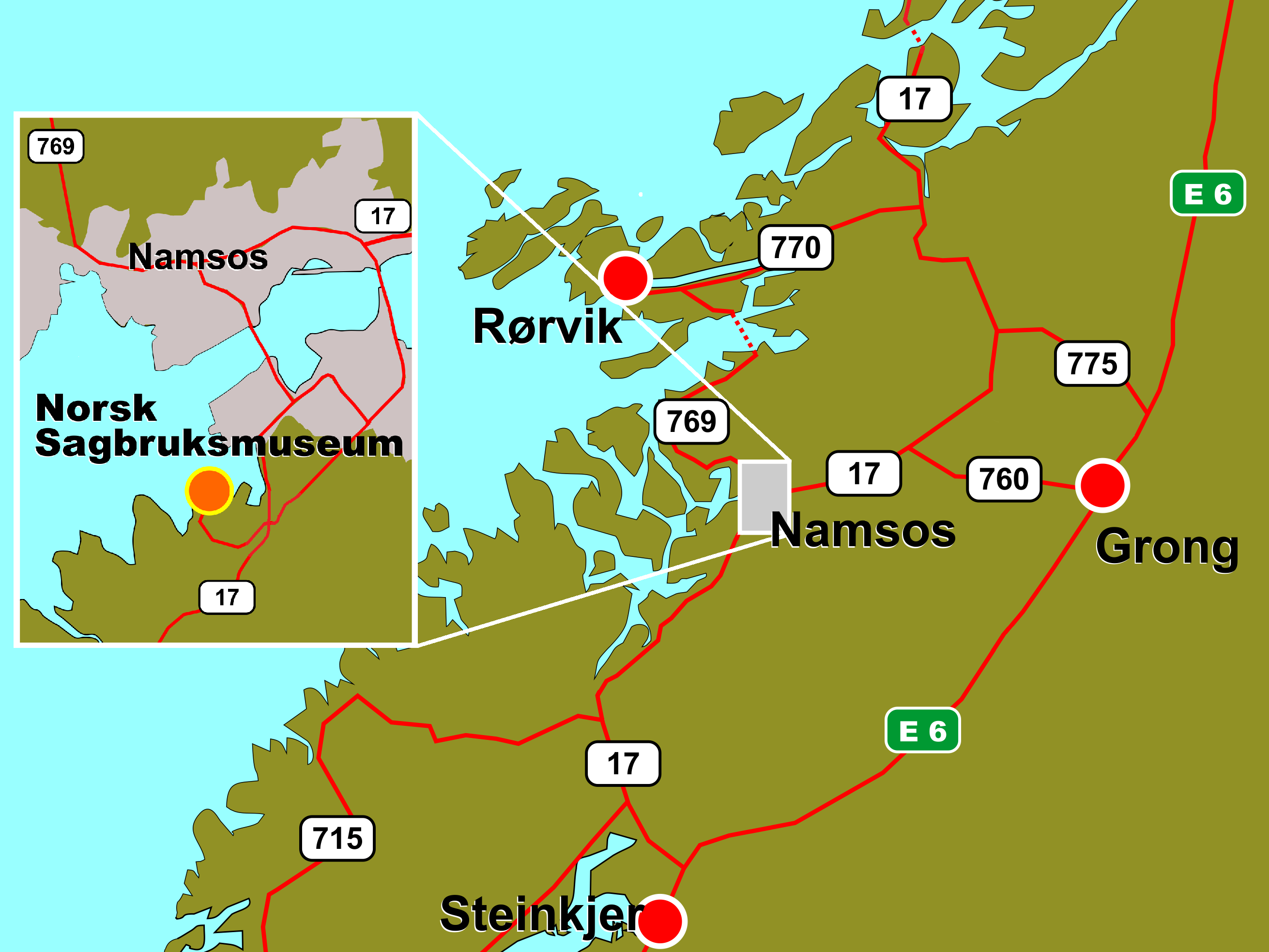
The Norwegian Sawmill Museum is situated just south of Namsos, Norway

Spillum Sawmill & Planing (Spillum Dampsag & Høvleri) was founded in 1884, as one of the first steam powered sawmills in Norway. Until then the sawmill industry had been powered by water-driven vertical saws. Still it had been one of the country's largest export industries since the 16th century. Towards the end of the 19th century, the export greatly diminished. However, the export was largely replaced by production to growing domestic markets.

A burgeoning industrialization and urban development in the beginning of the 20th century led to the emergence of the modern day Norwegian society. These trends gave rise to a new and growing demand for lumber for the construction of housing and other buildings in Norway, particularly in the cities. A booming sawmill industry emerged.

As a medium-sized sawmill, Spillum Sawmill & Planing predominantly produced for the northern regions of Norway. The products ranged from sawn timber and unplaned cladding to mouldings and panels. The sawmill even produced prefabricated homes, interiors included. Houses for workmen and beach cabins were produced based on standardized designs.

In the 1940s, the sawmill was modernized. Electric motors were mounted on the saws and the planer. From this point onwards, the steam engine was left inoperative, except for the fact that the sawmill still continued to use the steam engine's boiler to generate steam for the process of drying sawn timber in a new building raised for this purpose adjacent to the production facilities.

In total, the production facility and the newer drying building have a ground area of about 2,960 square metres (31,900 sq ft), which makes this building one of the largest wooden buildings in the Nordic countries.

In 1986, the production at the saw mill ceased. At the time, The Norwegian Museum of Science and Technology was conducting a process to find a steam-powered saw mill that could be preserved as a technical-industrial cultural heritage site. Spillum Sawmill turned out to be the best preserved sawmill of its kind in the country. The foundation Spillum Sawmill & Planing was subsequently formed. The foundation bought the sawmill, including the buildings, machines and the inventory. The acquisition was financially supported by the Directorate for Cultural Heritage.

The sawmill was then extensively restored and refurbished before it was opened to the public in summer of 1991 as The Norwegian Sawmill Museum. In 1994, Spillum Sawmill & Planing was selected as one cultural memorial site to give priority in the conservation plan of the Directorate for Cultural Heritage.

The conservation of craftsmanship knowledge has been a key priority area at the museum. The saw mill has been able to maintain low scale production on the old saws and the planer. Consequently, a “living museum” has been achieved. The saw mill produces among other things high quality replicas for restoration projects.

The entirety of the saw mill site, with the buildings, machines and other objects, including an all but complete corporate archive from 1884 onwards, constitutes a time capsule from the early industrialization in Norway.

== M/B Hauka ==
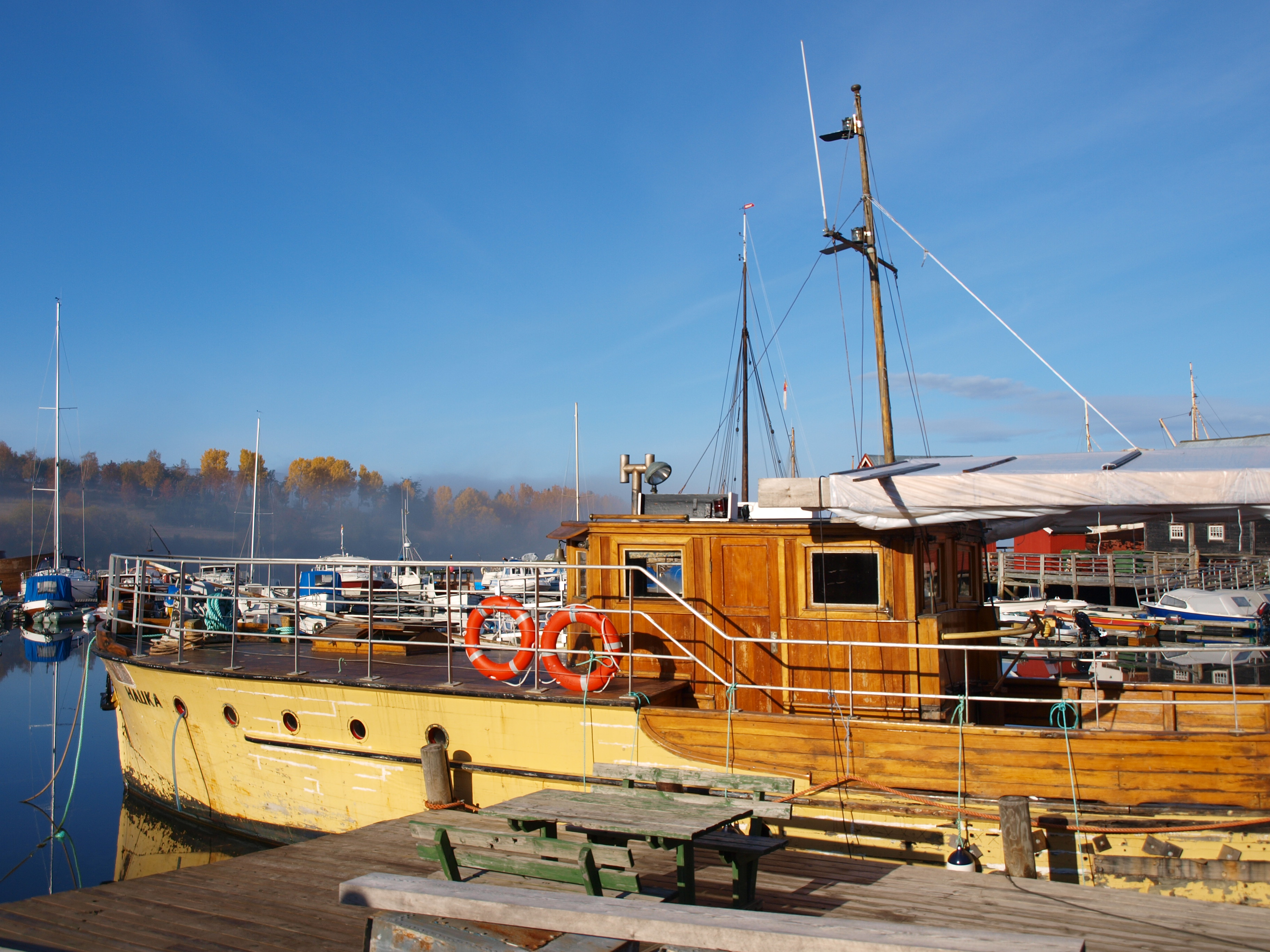
M/B Hauka

M/B “Hauka” is a 16.5-metre (54 ft) long vessel drawn by the engineer Richard G. Furuholmen and built at Moen Yard in Risør in 1934. The vessel was ordered by the company Albert Collett, and assigned to Salsbruket Pulp Mill where it was operative until 1985 except for the duration of World War II. The Germans then requisitioned it for their military base in Rørvik. The vessel was mainly used for towing of raw material to the pulp mill. In winter it could also be used for ice breaking whenever needed. Moreover, it was used to transport the owners and their families when they left the capital to come on a visit. The boat then looked glamorous, neatly cleaned and shined up for the occasion.

As Salsbruket was cut off from the mainland, the boat came to play a greater role than initially intended for the growing society which derived their livelihood from the pulp mill. Salsbruket was first connected to the mainland in 1968, when a regular ferry transport was opened. Before that, whenever there was a medical emergency, Hauka and its crew often played a crucial role. On several occasions their effort was life-saving. The fact that three births took place on Hauka is a case in point.

When the pulp mill at Salsbruket burnt down in 1985, the vessel was sold to a buyer outside Namdalen. In 1991, Hauka was brought back to the region and was subsequently taken over by a joint ownership, registered as “MB Hauka BA”. Its main objective was to restore Hauka and make sure it stayed in Namdalen. In 1994, The Directorate for Cultural Heritage gave Hauka status as “protected” and has considerably supported the restoration of the vessel financially.

On 1 January 2004, the ownership was transferred to The Norwegian Sawmill Museum. As of 2011, M/B Hauka has in recent years been refurbished for a total worth of close to 1 million kr. However, there still remains a lot of restoration work to be done before the vessel can again be seen on the Namsenfjord.

== Literature ==
- Hustad, Åge (1999). MB Hauka. Bruksbåten - skyssbåten - slepebåten - isbryteren. Namsos. ISBN 82-91134-20-0.
- Mørkved, Karl L. (1949). Skogbruk og treforedling i Namdal. Historisk streiftog. Trondheim.
- Sandvik, Pål T. (2008). "Spillum Dampsag & Høvleri. I". In Sandvik, Pål T.; Stang, Margrethe C. (eds.). Industrispor. Fra Melbu til Lindesnes. Aschehoug. ISBN 978-82-03-23606-8.
