= Ramsvika =

Ramsvika may refer to one of the following locations:

== Places ==
- Ramsvika, Vestvågøy, a village in Vestvågøy Municipality in Nordland county, Norway
- Ramsvika, Øksnes, a village in Øksnes Municipality in Nordland county, Norway
- Ramsvika, Trøndelag, a village in Namsos municipality in Trøndelag county, Norway
