= Namsos Church =

Church in Trøndelag, Norway

- Namsos kirke
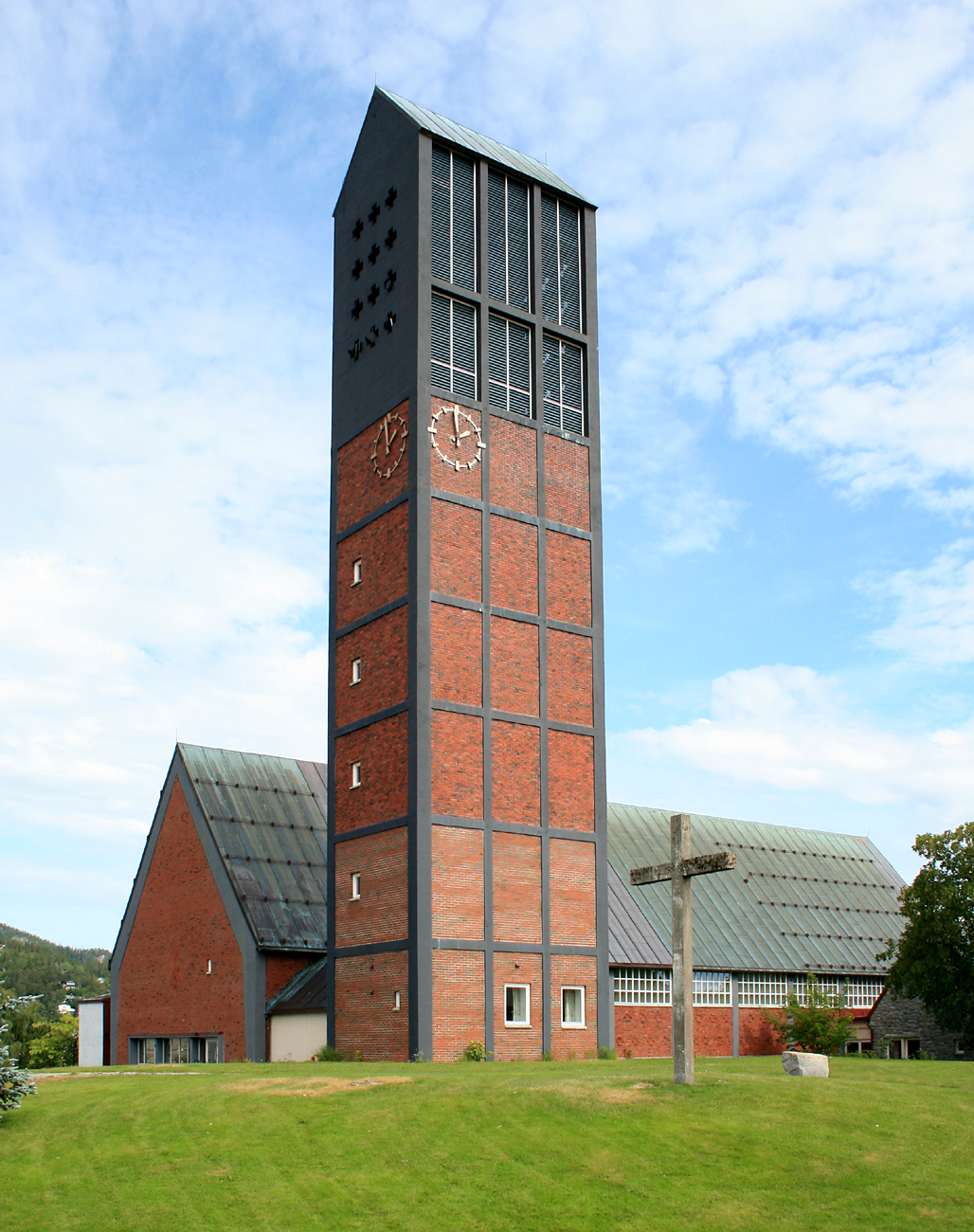
- View of the church
- Namsos Church
- 64.46574904°N 11.4949157238°E
- Location: Namsos Municipality, Trøndelag
- Country: Norway
- Denomination: Church of Norway
- Churchmanship: Evangelical Lutheran

History
- Status: Parish church
- Founded: 1859
- Consecrated: 1960

Architecture
- Functional status: Active
- Architect: Ola B. Aasness
- Architectural type: Rectangular
- Completed: 1960 (66 years ago)

Specifications
- Capacity: 622
- Materials: Brick

Administration
- Diocese: Nidaros bispedømme
- Deanery: Namdal prosti
- Parish: Namsos
- Norwegian Cultural Heritage Site
- Type: Church
- Status: Not protected
- ID: 85090

Namsos Church (Norwegian: Namsos kirke) is a parish church of the Church of Norway in Namsos Municipality in Trøndelag county, Norway. It is located in the centre of the town of Namsos, just north of the mouth of the river Namsen. It is the church for the Namsos parish which is the seat of the Namdal prosti (deanery) in the Diocese of Nidaros. The large, brick church was built in 1960 to replace the previous one which was bombed and burned during World War II. The rectangular church was built using plans drawn up by the architect Ola B. Aasness and it seats about 622 people. The church also has a free-standing bell tower on the south side of the main building.

== History ==
The town of Namsos was established in 1845 and it was not until 1859 when the first church was built in the town. Prior to that time, the town was served by the old Sævik Church in the Fosnes parish. The new church was designed in 1857 by a local customs officer named Dahl. The plans were presented to Christian H. Grosch who was the architect for the Ministry of Church Affairs who critiqued the plans as incomplete and difficult to understand. Work had begun on the new church in 1857, even before formal permission had been given, but on 10 January 1858, the partially constructed building was heavily damaged in a major winter storm. The church was rebuilt afterwards, being completed in 1859. The new octagonal, wooden building was consecrated on 19 October 1859. On 27 June 1872, there was a massive fire in the town of Namsos which burned the church, however, some of the interior fixtures were saved.

After the fire, Håkon Mosling was hired to design a new church for the town. The architectural drawings were approved in 1873. It was to be a timber-framed long church and it was consecrated on 9 December 1874. The new church did not last long, however, because on 30 May 1897 another city-wide fire engulfed the church and burned it to the ground. The third church building in Namsos was designed by Karl Norum and it was built on the same site in 1903. It was consecrated on 18 December 1903. This new church was a stone long church with about 650 seats.

During World War II, the city was heavily bombed during the Namsos campaign. Much of the city was destroyed or burned in the ensuing fires, including the church. The only remains of the church were the exterior stone walls. After the war, the ruins of the church were torn down and a new church was built on the same site. An architectural competition was held to design the new church in 1946. Ola B. Aasness won the competition with his design called "Long Ship" and this design was officially chosen by the city council in 1948. Financing issues, construction issues, and scaling down the size of the church caused many delays and the new church was not completed and consecrated until 15 May 1960.

== Media gallery ==
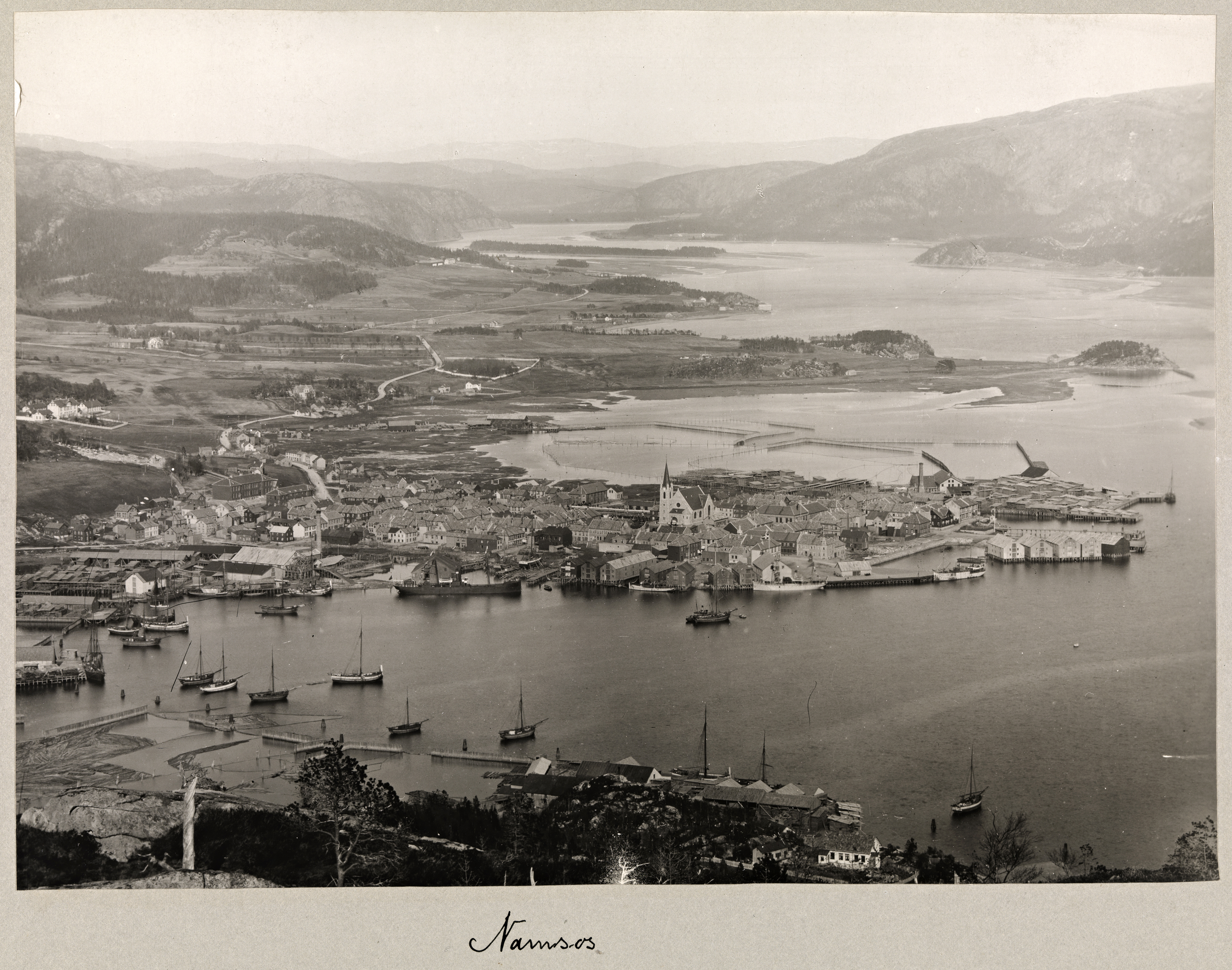
View of Namsos and the church (prior to WWII)

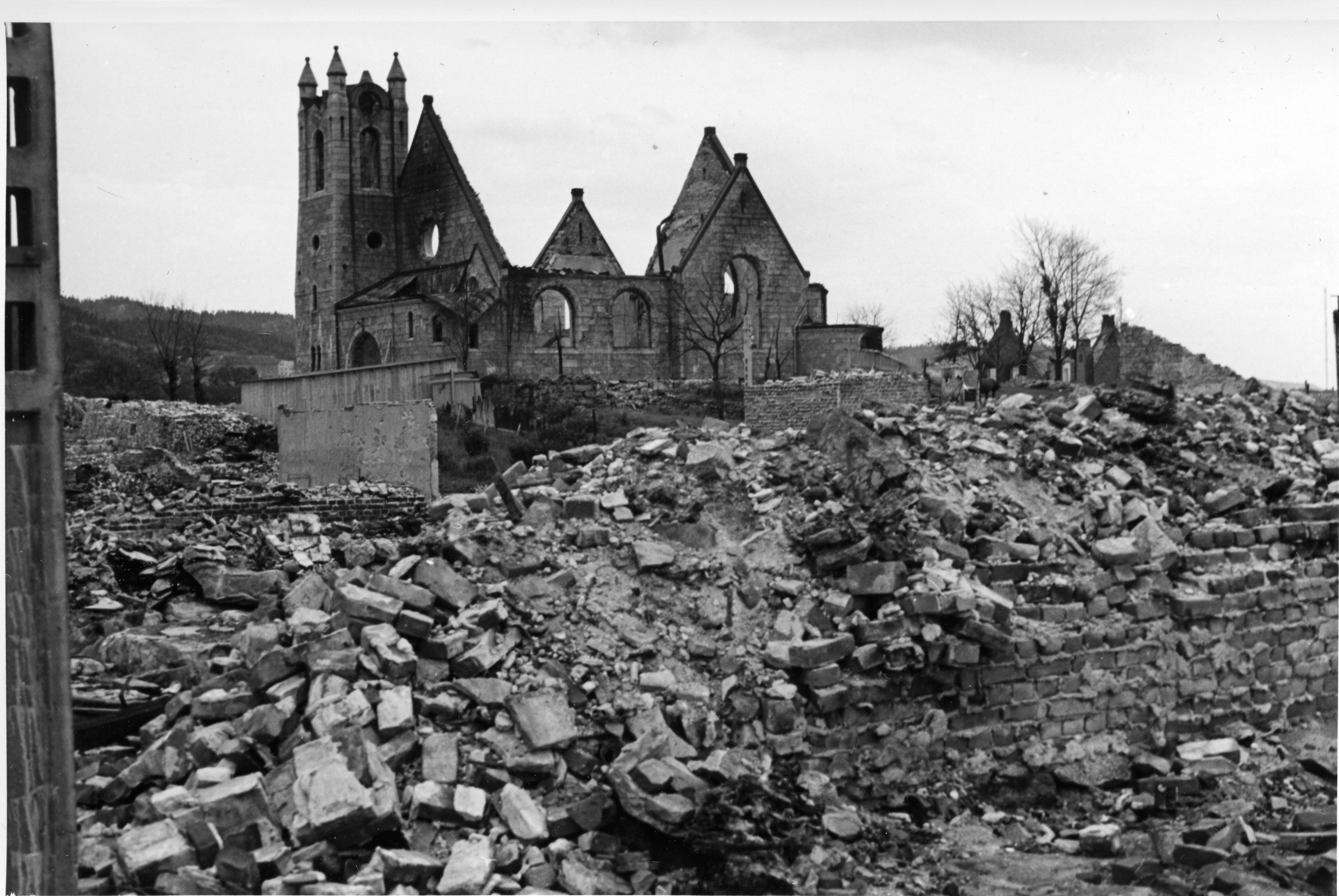
View of the ruins of the old church (1940)

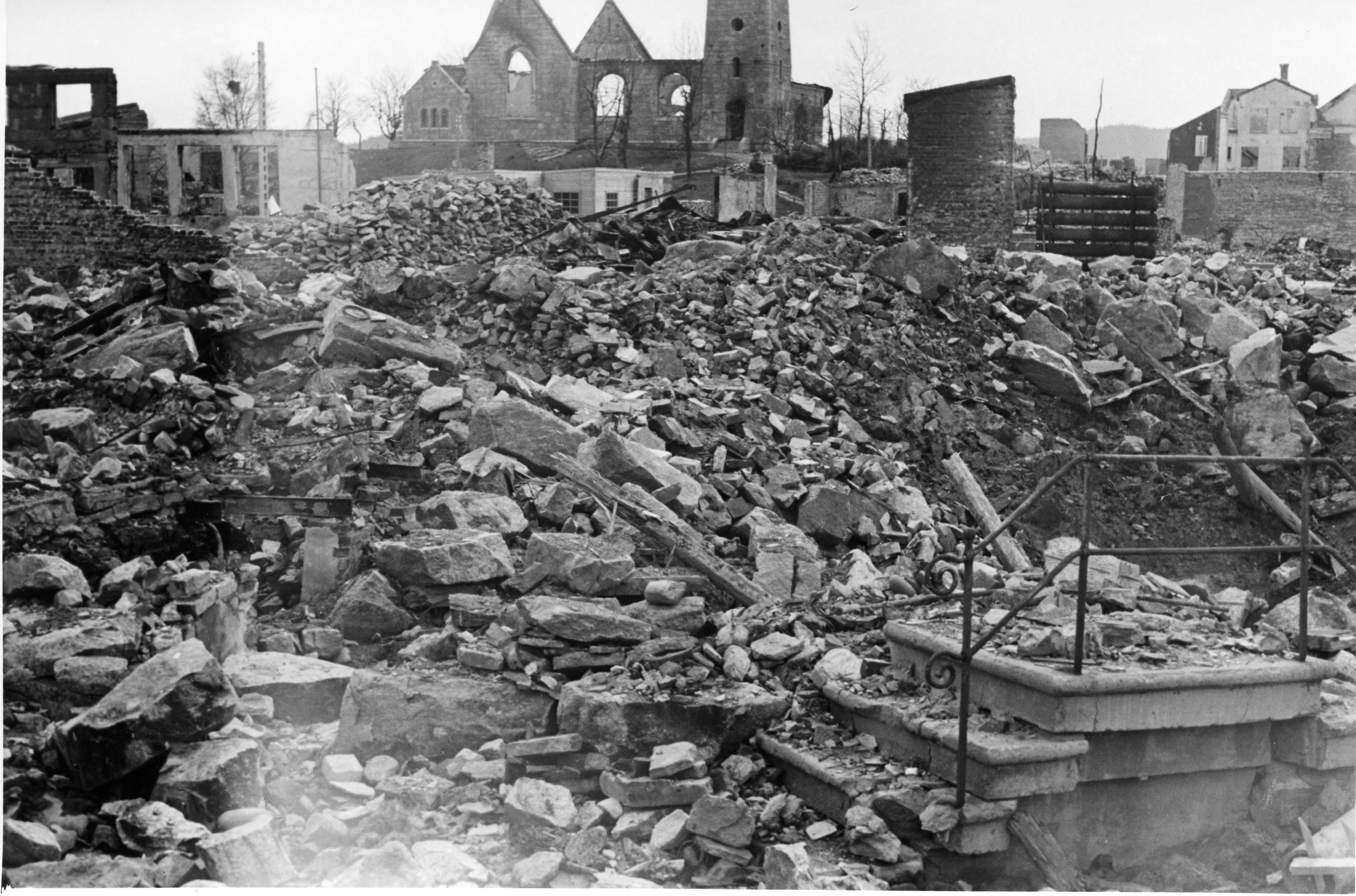
View of the ruins of the old church (1940)

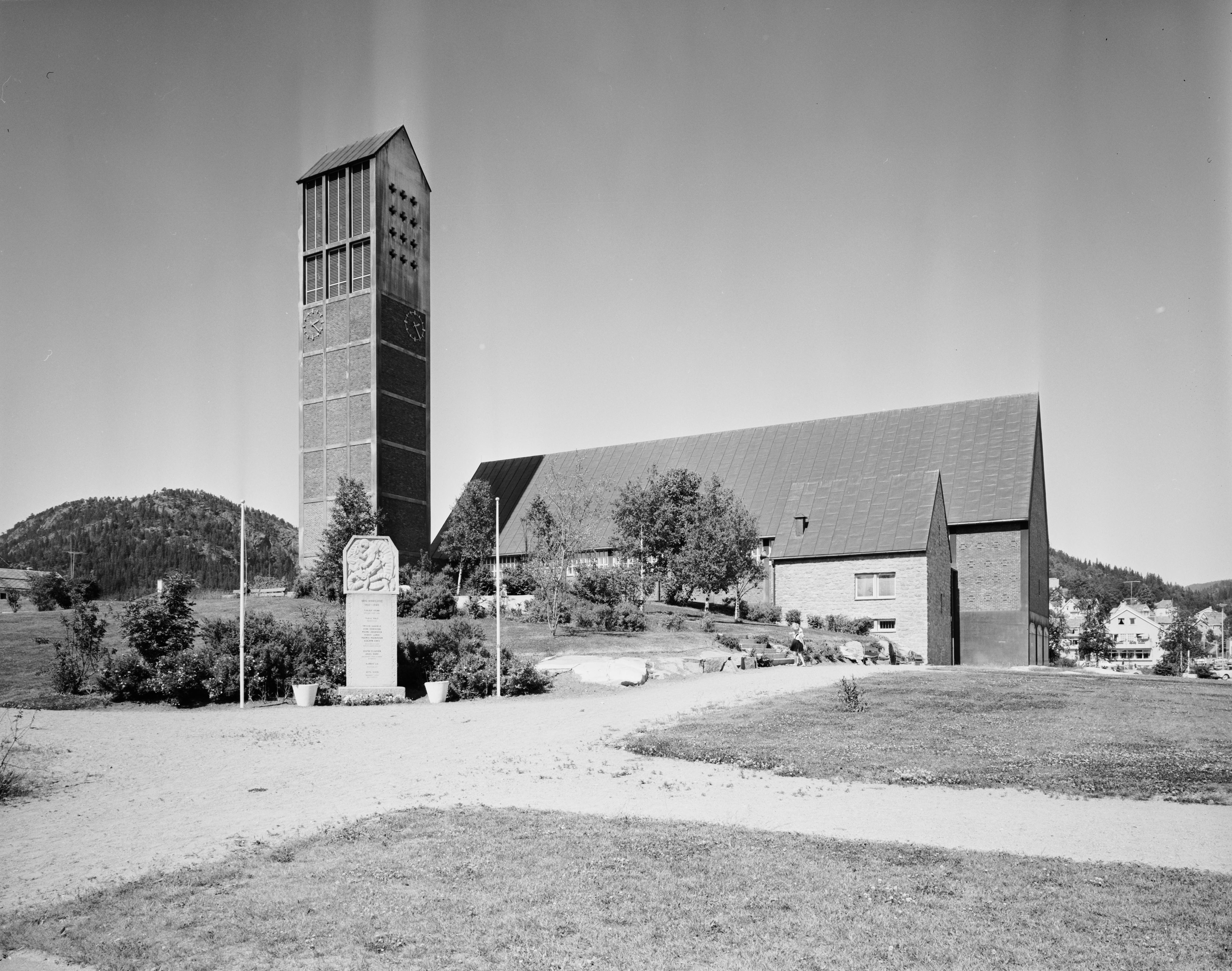
View of the new church (c. 1960)

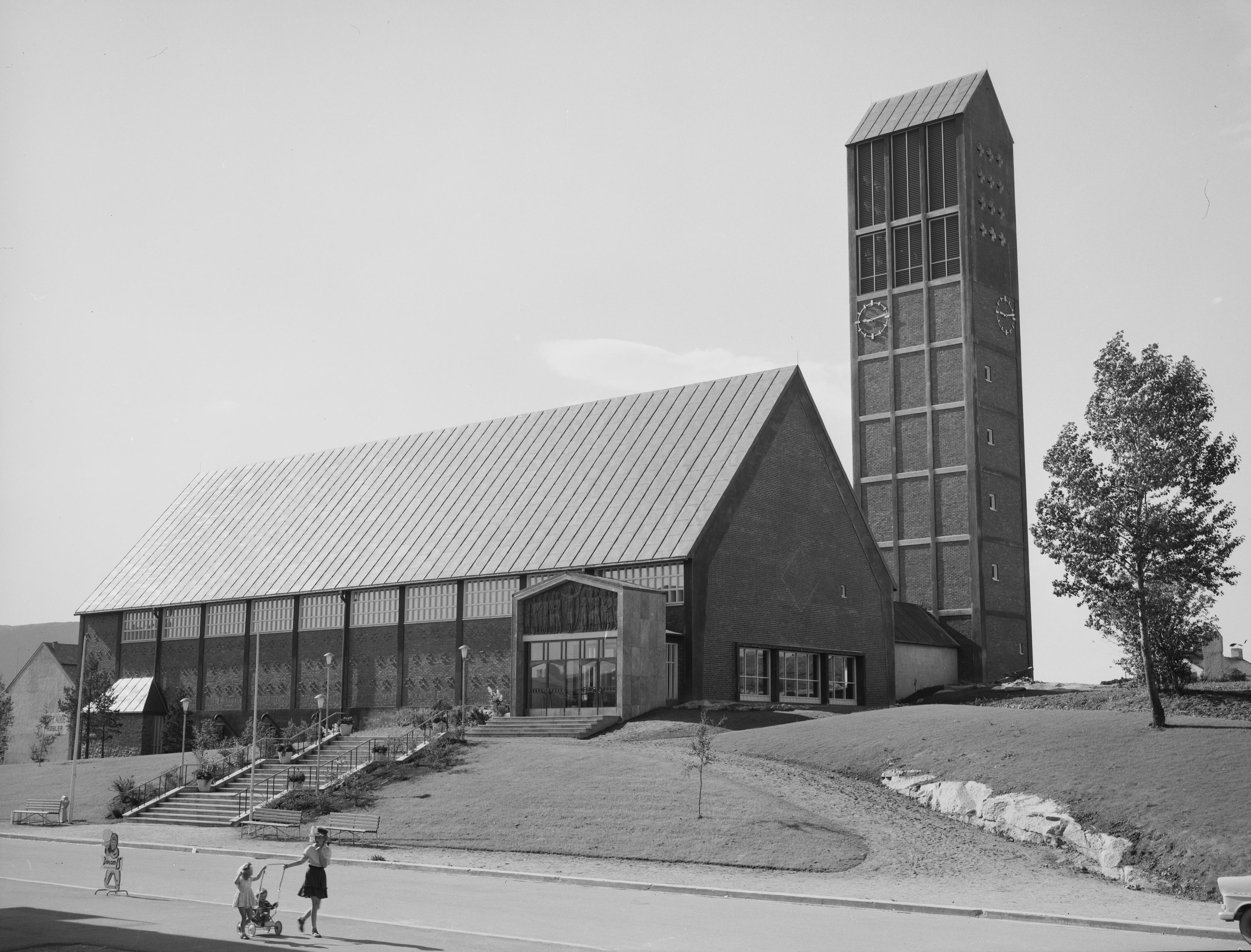
View of the new church (c. 1960)

== See also ==
- List of churches in Nidaros
