= Christian Møinichen Havig =

Norwegian politician

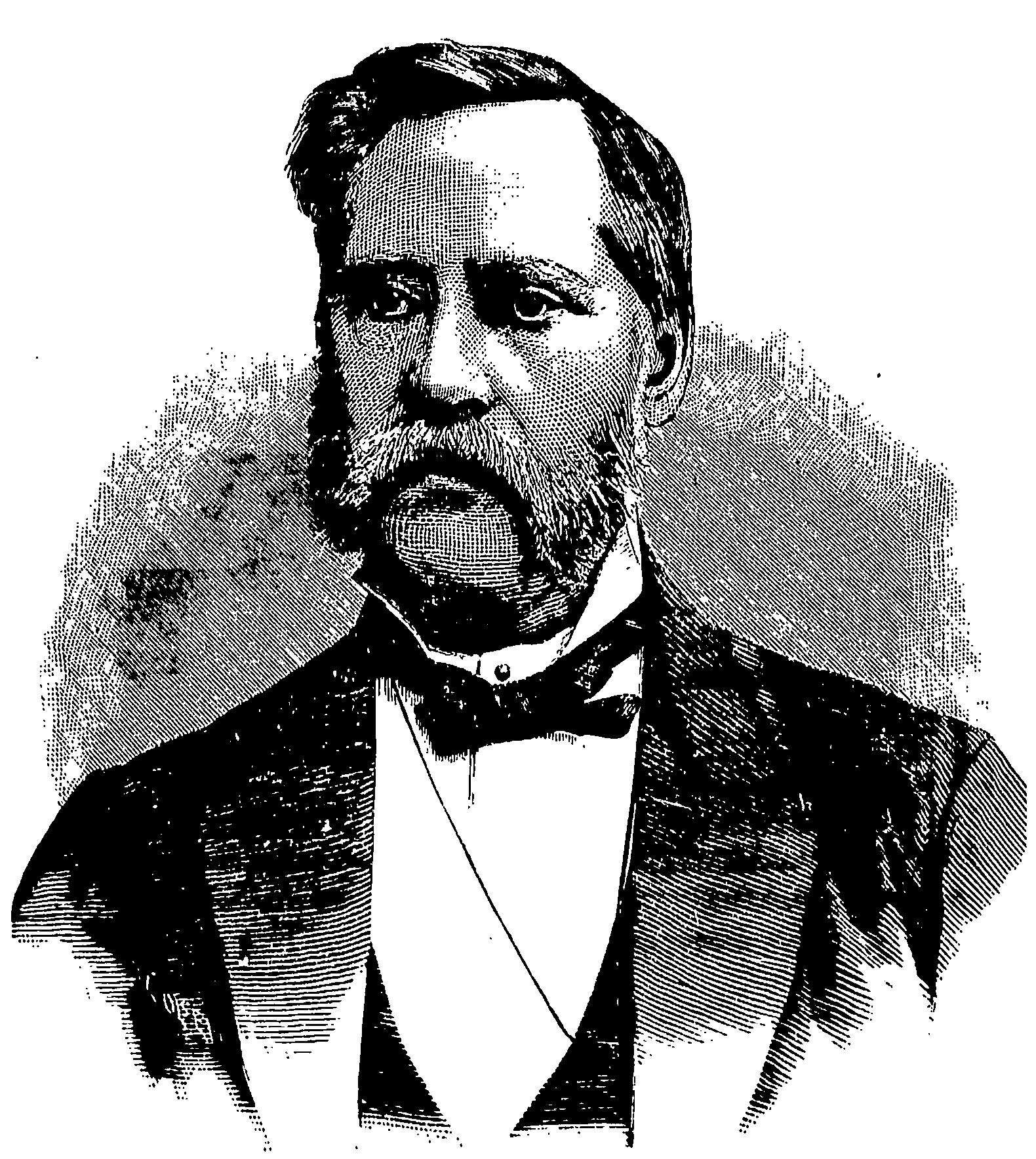
- Born: April 4, 1825; Overhalla, Norway
- Died: April 10, 1912 (aged 87)
- Occupations: Politician, Liberal Party

Christian Møinichen Havig (April 4, 1825 – April 10, 1912) was a Norwegian bailiff (lensmann) and Storting representative for Nordland from 1871 to 1888.

== Family ==
Havig was born at the Havika farm in Overhalla in the Namdalen district (now in Namsos Municipality). When he was still a child, his family moved to Vikna Municipality. In 1854 he married Dorthea Karstine Nergaard (1831–1915), from Seierstad on the island of Jøa. He was the father of the Liberal Party Storting representative Christian Fredrik Nergaard Havig (1855–1927) and the bailiff in Vefsn Municipality Thorleiv Nergaard Havig (1867–1938).

== Life ==
Apart from the instruction in the ambulatory school (omgangsskole) taught by a traveling schoolmaster, Havig received little formal education. Nonetheless, he managed to learn enough on his own that he was accepted for office work for the bailiff in Nærøy Municipality and Vikna Municipality. Later he was employed by his cousin, the bailiff Jørgen Johannes Havig in Namsos, who was a member of the Storting. Here he served for a period as the town's mayor and settlement commissioner (forlikskommissær). In 1848, he was appointed as an assistant to the district judge in Namdalen, where he remained until 1858, when he was appointed bailiff in Vefsn in Nordland. This position lasted until 1904, when he was succeeded by his son, Thorleiv Nergaard Havig.

In 1871, Havig was elected Storting representative for Nordland County, and he was reelected for the following parliamentary sessions until 1888. From 1871 to 1874, he was a member of the Standing Committee on Justice. In 1875 he became a member of the Railway Committee, where he became chairman in 1880. From 1874 to 1876 he was a secretary in the Storting's lower house (the Odelsting), and later a secretary in the Storting. He was a member of the Constitutional Court of the Realm from 1883 to 1884, where he also served as its interim president. In 1884 he was elected a member of the parliamentary jury committee, and he was president of the Storting's upper house (the Lagting) from 1885 to 1888 as a member of the Liberal Party.

After the dissolution of the union between Norway and Sweden in 1905, Havig was a supporter of the republican faction. In 1905 he also served as the mayor of Vefsn Municipality.
