= Olav Benum =

Norwegian politician (1897–1990)

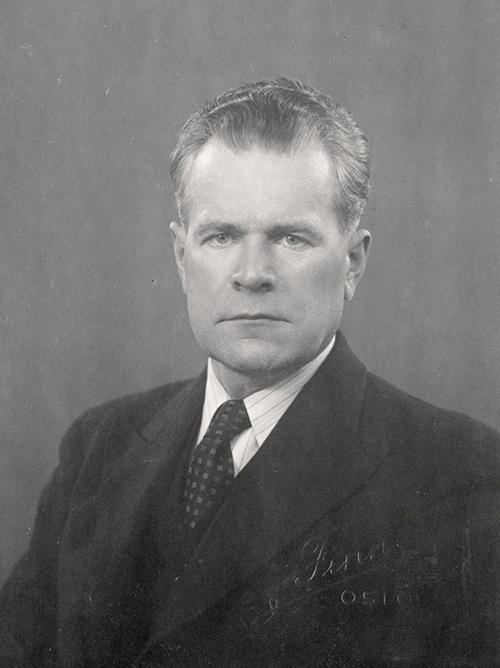
Olav Benum

Olav Benum (5 September 1897 – 27 June 1990) was a Norwegian elected official and politician with the Liberal Party.

== Biography ==
He was born at Beitstad in Nord-Trøndelag, Norway.

He was elected to the Norwegian Parliament from Nord-Trøndelag in 1945, and was re-elected on three occasions. He had previously served as a deputy representative during the term 1937–1945.

Benum was deputy mayor and member of the municipal council of Vemundvik Municipality in 1934–1937, and mayor in 1937–1941 and 1945. At the same time he was a member of Nord-Trøndelag county council. He later became a member of the municipal council for Namsos Municipality during the terms 1963–1967 and 1967–1971. Again, during the same time he became involved in the county council. He served as deputy county mayor in 1963–1966 and county mayor in 1966–1967.

Outside politics he worked as an agronomist. In the Norwegian Agrarian Association he was a member of the board from 1946 to 1953. From 1942 to 1945, during the German occupation of Norway, he fled to Stockholm, Sweden and worked at the Norwegian legation there.

== Other sources ==
- "Olav Benum" (in Norwegian). Storting.

Preceded by Johan A. Vikan	County mayor of Nord-Trøndelag; 1966–1967	Succeeded by Knut Aas
