= Ramsvika, Trøndelag =

Village in Namsos Municipality, Norway

Ramsvika
- Village
- Interactive map of Ramsvika
- Location within Trøndelag Location within Norway
- Coordinates: 64.5165°N 11.4889°E
- Country: Norway
- Region: Central Norway
- County: Trøndelag
- District: Namdalen
- Municipality: Namsos Municipality
- Elevation: 15 m (49 ft)
- Time zone: UTC+01:00 (CET)
  - Summer (DST): UTC+02:00 (CEST)
- Post Code: 7810 Namsos

Ramsvika is a village in Namsos Municipality in Trøndelag county, Norway. It is located along the sea shore about 7 kilometres (4.3 mi) north of the town of Namsos and about 3 kilometres (1.9 mi) west of Vemundvik Church.
