= Fredrik Havig =

Norwegian politician

Christian Fredrik Nergaard Havig
- Born: October 13, 1855; Namdalen, Sweden-Norway
- Died: August 30, 1927 (aged 71)
- Occupations: Politician, Liberal Party

Christian Fredrik Nergaard Havig (October 13, 1855 – August 30, 1927) was a Norwegian judge, mayor, and Storting representative.

Havig was born in 1855 in Namdalen, where his father, Christian Møinichen Havig, served as bailiff (lensmann). He began his university studies in 1873 and received his Candidate of Law degree in 1878. From 1879 to 1883 he was a district judge in the northern Gudbrand Valley, after which he worked for three years as a lawyer in Kongsberg. He worked as a lawyer in Mosjøen from 1886 to 1896. In addition, he served as a bailiff (fogd) in Lofoten and Vesterålen, and from 1898 to 1909 he was a district judge in Lofoten, and then district judge in Ringerike until his retirement.

In 1881 and 1883 Havig served as a member of the municipal council for Vaage Municipality. In 1885 and 1886 he was the mayor of Kongsberg Municipality, and in 1890 and 1894 he was the mayor of Mosjøen. In 1894 he also became a member of the Norges Bank board of representatives.

From 1892 to 1894, Havig, was first deputy for Nordland county in the Storting. After the death of Storting representative Kristian Moursund, Havig started representing the county on April 22, 1892. He represented the county until 1900 and again from 1903 to 1906, and he also represented the Lofoten single-member district from 1906 to 1909. He was a member of the parliament's justice committee. Havig sat in the Lagting from 1895 to 1900 and from 1903 to 1909. He also had several positions, including chamber secretary.
