= Ambulatory school =

Historical traveling schools in Norway

An ambulatory school (Norwegian: omgangsskole) was a Norwegian educational institution that was established after the first Norwegian school law was passed in 1739. In places where it was not possible to gather students in a schoolroom, the teachers traveled around to teach. The Public Rural Schools Act (Lov om almueskolevæsenet) of 1860 required the municipalities to establish permanent schools that would replace ambulatory schools.

== History ==
The 1739 law established the foundation for Norway's first public schools. In towns, schools were established for commoners and for the poor. In rural areas, the population was too dispersed to create permanent schools, and so ambulatory schools were created.

The ambulatory school scheme was organized such that each parish was divided into districts. Each district had its own ambulatory teacher (omgangskoleholder). The district was then divided into three to five smaller locales (sg. rode, pl. roder). A locale consisted of several farms that were more or less together. The teaching took place in one of the houses in the locale, and this responsibility passed from farm to farm in the locale. The farms were required to maintain the schoolroom when it was their turn, as well as provide the teacher with a place to stay and meals. The pupils received approximately two months of instruction a year, but this varied over time. The teacher operated the school by circulating among the locales in his district, hence the name of the school arrangement.

The teacher was selected by the priest from among the brightest confirmed members of the parish. He received some further training in reading and Christian doctrine from the sexton, and then he was ready to teach. The teacher was preferably a resident of the parish because then he could still live at home, saving the parish additional expenses.

The early public schools and ambulatory schools were primarily Christian schools intended to guide children toward confirmation. The teaching consisted mainly of instruction in Christian doctrine. Some also taught reading, writing, and math.

In some areas, ambulatory schools operated until the beginning of the 20th century, despite the 1860 Public Rural Schools Act, also known as the "Permanent School Act" (Fastskoleloven), which required municipalities to establish permanent schools.
