= Vemundvik Church =

Church in Trøndelag, Norway

- Vemundvik kirke
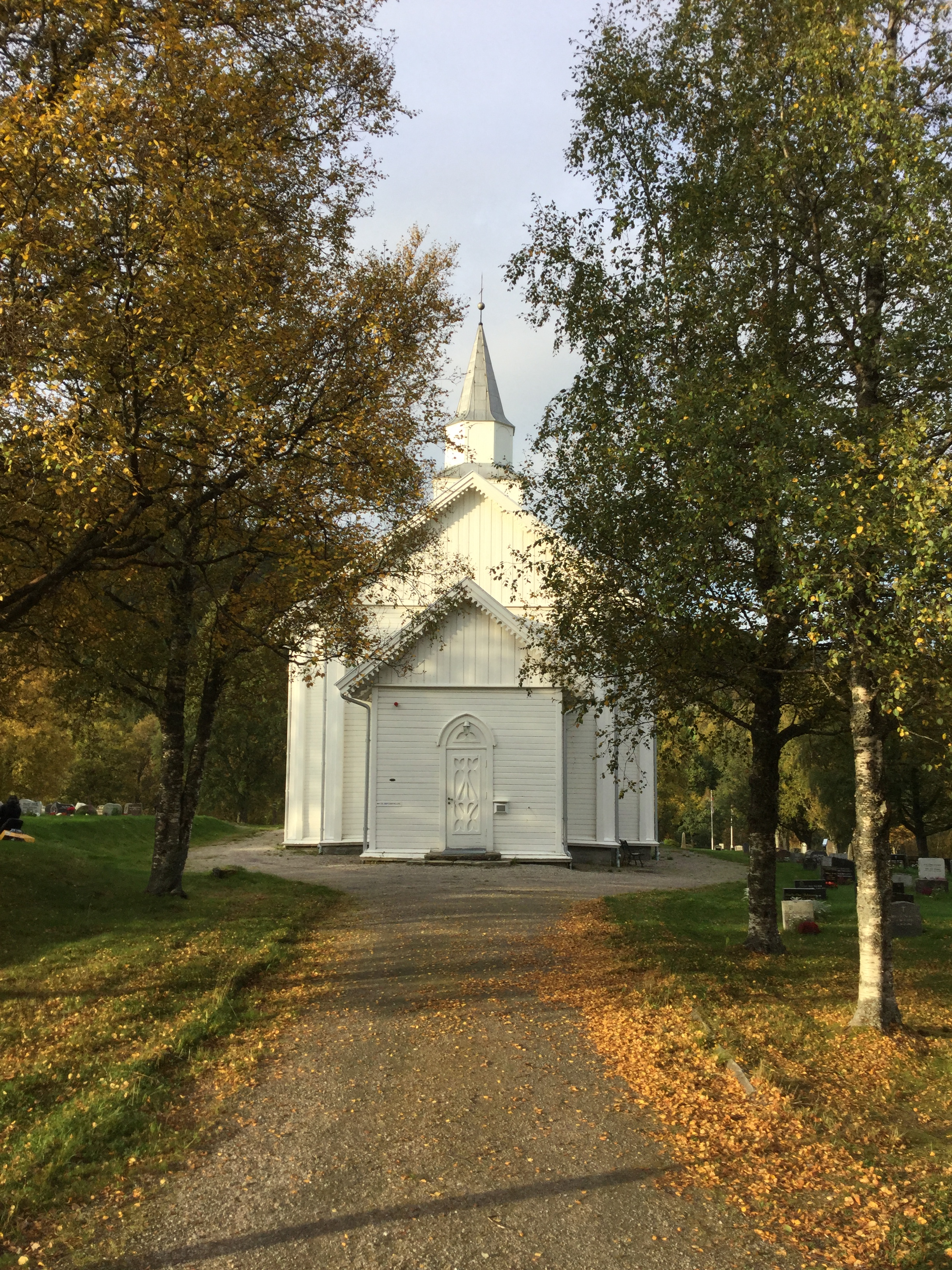
- View of the church Credit: M.O. Haugen, 2016
- Vemundvik Church
- 64.51667818°N 11.541860551°E
- Location: Namsos Municipality, Trøndelag
- Country: Norway
- Denomination: Church of Norway
- Churchmanship: Evangelical Lutheran

History
- Status: Parish church
- Founded: 1844
- Consecrated: 15 Dec 1875

Architecture
- Functional status: Active
- Architect: Ole Olsen Scheistrøen
- Architectural type: Long church
- Completed: 1875 (151 years ago)

Specifications
- Capacity: 300
- Materials: Wood

Administration
- Diocese: Nidaros bispedømme
- Deanery: Namdal prosti
- Parish: Vemundvik
- Norwegian Cultural Heritage Site
- Type: Church
- Status: Not protected
- ID: 85802

Vemundvik Church (Norwegian: Vemundvik kirke) is a parish church of the Church of Norway in Namsos Municipality in Trøndelag county, Norway. It is located in the village of Vemundvik, just east of the village of Ramsvika. It is the church for the Vemundvik parish which is part of the Namdal prosti (deanery) in the Diocese of Nidaros. The white, wooden church was built in a long church style in 1875 using plans drawn up by the architect Ole Olsen Scheistrøen. The church seats about 300 people.

== History ==
A royal decree from 30 December 1842 gave permission to build a church at Vemundvik. The church was built using plans by the architect Hans Linstow and it was consecrated on 20 September 1844. It was a very simple, small long church without any tower or sacristy. In 1875, it was decided to tear down the old church and replace it with a new building on the same site. The new church held about 300 people and it was consecrated on 15 December 1875. The church was restored in 1950-1955 with John Egil Tverdahl and Ola Seter as architectural consultants.

== See also ==
- List of churches in Nidaros
