= Jørgen Johannes Havig =

Norwegian politician (1808–1883)

- Born: July 31, 1808; Vemundvik, Norway
- Died: January 19, 1883 (aged 74)
- Occupation: Politician

Jørgen Johannes Havig (July 31, 1808 – January 19, 1883) was a Norwegian bailiff (lensmann), farm owner, and politician. He is regarded as a driving force behind the founding of Namsos, which was established as a "small seaport" (Norwegian: ladested or lossested) in 1845. Havig also served several terms as a Storting representative.

Havig was born in Vemundvik, the son of the bailiff Johan Havig, and he performed his father's duties while he was ill. Already at the age of 12, he was employed at the stipendiary magistrate (sorenskriver) Elias Frederik Hetting's office, and he became a formal assistant at his father's bailiff's office at the age of 16. He never received formal schooling, but was taught by his father (who was trained as a teacher), the attorney Søren Reiersen Thornæs, and the dean Peter Christian Boye, and he is said to have been particularly talented in mathematics, astronomy, and French. Havig took over the bailiff's office from his father at the age of 18 in 1826, and he was in charge of the Namsos and Fosnes bailiff districts until he retired in 1878, after 52 years of service. Havig also operated Havika, his family farm in Vemundvik outside of Namsos. He married his cousin Anne Margrethe Guldvig, to whom their son Johannes Bernhard Havig (1838–1893) was born.

After passage of the laws introducing local government (formannskapslovene) in 1837, Havig quickly gained trust as a member of the Vemundvik rural district council (1838–1873), but his position as a bailiff forbade him from becoming the mayor or a member of the municipal executive board. He was elected to the Storting to represent Nordre Trondhjem county from 1839 to 1841 (at the age of 31), and again from 1845 to 1847. He was a member of the Storting's protocol committee, but he exercised the most influence through the contacts he created with the capital. In order to simplify timber exports, he worked to construct a small seaport with a customs office in Namdalen. In 1845, Namsos was founded at the mouth of the Namsen River, and Havig even contributed to surveying and distributing the plots of land. Havig also served as settlement commissioner (forlikskommissær) in Overhalla Municipality from 1856 to 1862 and in Namsos from 1862 to 1875, as director and treasurer for the Namsos Savings Bank (Namsos Sparebank) from 1842 to 1875, and as the managing director of the public library.

Havig was awarded the Medal for Outstanding Civic Service in 1876. Lensmann Havigs gate (Bailiff Havig Street) in Namsos is named after him.
