= Klinga (surname) =

Klinga is a surname. Notable people with the surname include:

- Elin Klinga (born 1969), Swedish actress
- Esa Klinga (1939–2026), Finnish skier
- Hans Klinga (1949–2025), Swedish actor and film director
- László Klinga (born 1947), Hungarian sport wrestler
- Lisa Klinga (born 1991), Swedish footballer
- Matti Klinga (born 1994), Finnish footballer
- Ville Klinga (born 1968), Finnish television presenter
