= Spillum =

Village in Namsos Municipality, Norway

- Village
- Interactive map of Spillum
- Location within Trøndelag Location within Norway
- Coordinates: 64.4454°N 11.5213°E
- Country: Norway
- Region: Central Norway
- County: Trøndelag
- District: Namdalen
- Municipality: Namsos Municipality

Area
  - Total: 1.77 km^{2} (0.68 sq mi)
- Elevation: 18 m (59 ft)

Population (2024)
  - Total: 1,382
  - Density: 781/km^{2} (2,020/sq mi)
- Time zone: UTC+01:00 (CET)
  - Summer (DST): UTC+02:00 (CEST)
- Post Code: 7820 Spillum

Spillum is a village in Namsos Municipality in Trøndelag county, Norway. The village is located along the south side of the Namsen river about 5 kilometres (3.1 mi) directly south of the centre of the town of Namsos and about 4 kilometres (2.5 mi) north of the village of Klinga. The Norwegian Sawmill Museum is located in the village of Spillum.

The 1.77-square-kilometre (440-acre) village has a population (2024) of 1,382 and a population density of 781 inhabitants per square kilometre (2,020/sq mi).
