= Klinga, Norway =

Village in Namsos Municipality, Norway

Klinga Klingen
- Village
- Interactive map of Klinga
- Location within Trøndelag Location within Norway
- Coordinates: 64.4092°N 11.4781°E
- Country: Norway
- Region: Central Norway
- County: Trøndelag
- District: Namdalen
- Municipality: Namsos Municipality
- Elevation: 61 m (200 ft)
- Time zone: UTC+01:00 (CET)
  - Summer (DST): UTC+02:00 (CEST)
- Post Code: 7820 Spillum

Klinga is a village in Namsos Municipality in Trøndelag county, Norway. The village is located about halfway between the villages of Bangsund and Spillum along the Norwegian County Road 17. The village of Sævik lies just north of Klinga and the town of Namsos lies about 8 kilometres (5.0 mi) to the north.

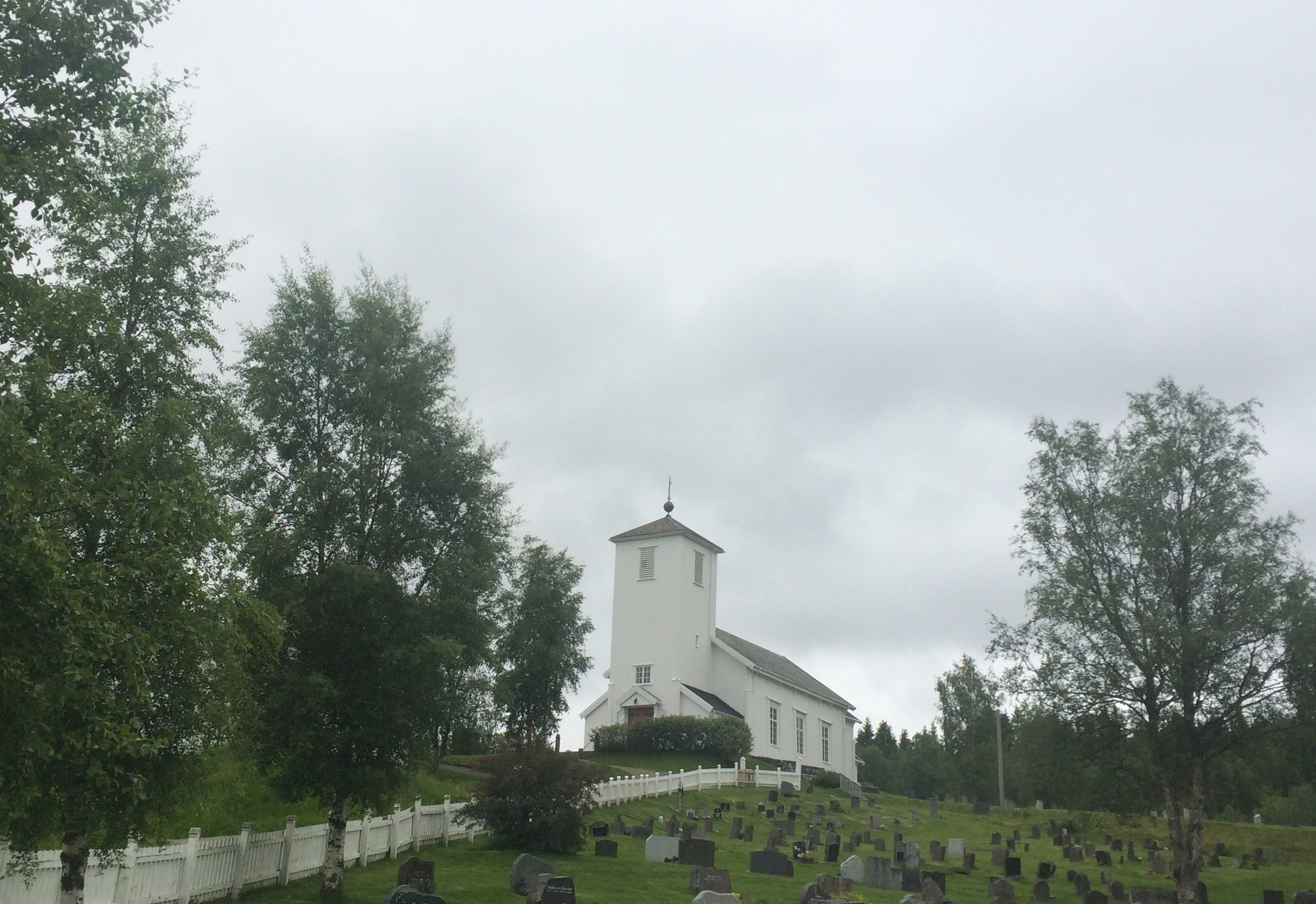
Klinga Church

The Church of Norway has a parish of Klinga which is based at the Klinga Church. Historically, it was part of the Namsos prestegjeld. In 1863, the local church was moved from the village of Sævik, just north of Klingen, to the village of Klingen. In May 1885, the parish name was changed from Sævik to Klinga.
