= Klinga Church =

Church in Trøndelag, Norway

- Klinga kirke
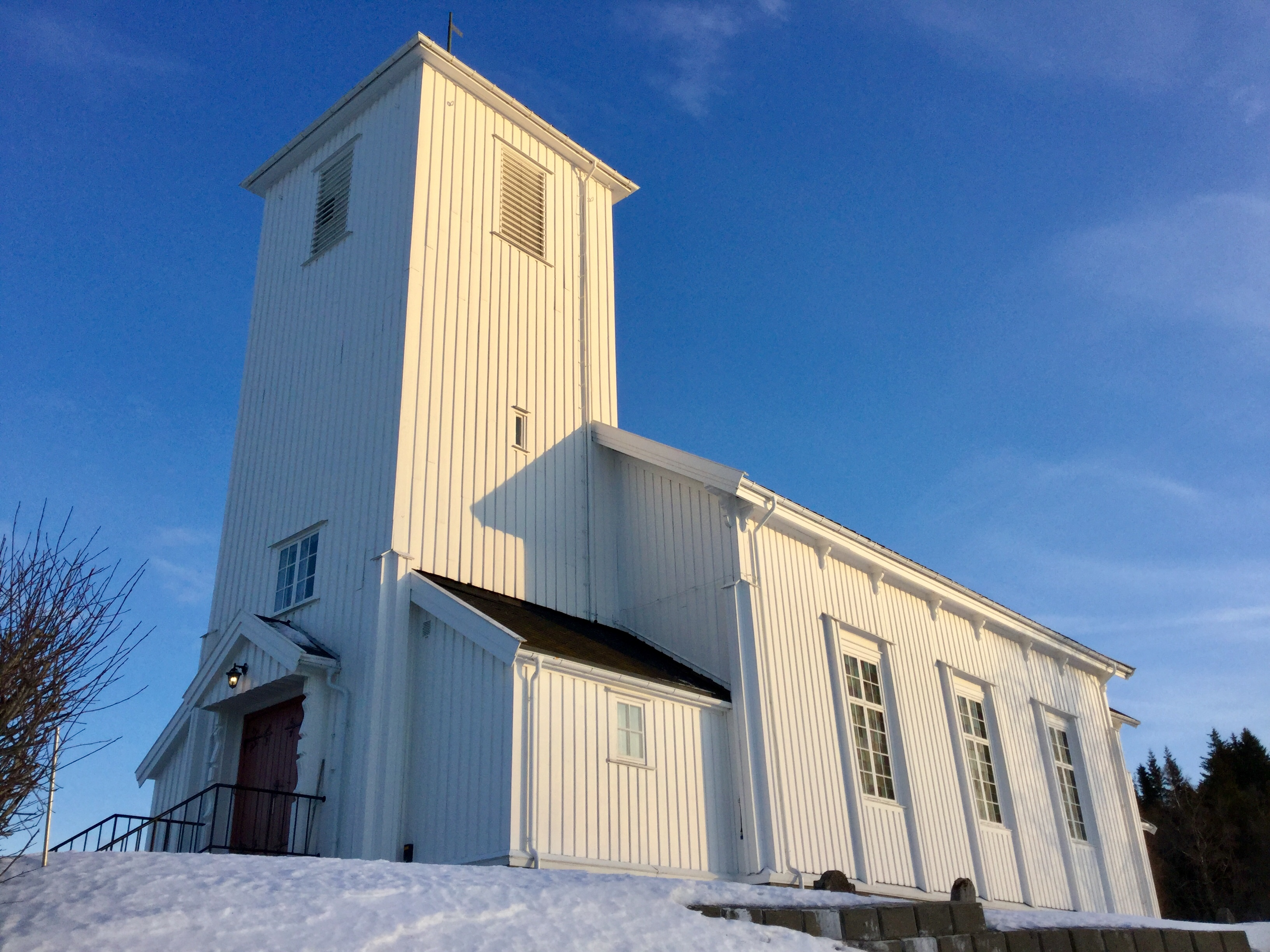
- View of the church
- Klinga Church
- 64.40628319°N 11.48363489°E
- Location: Namsos Municipality, Trøndelag
- Country: Norway
- Denomination: Church of Norway
- Churchmanship: Evangelical Lutheran

History
- Status: Parish church
- Founded: 14th century
- Consecrated: 7 March 1866

Architecture
- Functional status: Active
- Architect(s): Ernst Kulaas and Jacob Wilhelm Nordan
- Architectural type: Long church
- Completed: 1866 (160 years ago)

Specifications
- Capacity: 270
- Materials: Wood

Administration
- Diocese: Nidaros bispedømme
- Deanery: Namdal prosti
- Parish: Klinga
- Norwegian Cultural Heritage Site
- Type: Church
- Status: Listed
- ID: 84793

Klinga Church (Norwegian: Klinga kirke) is a parish church of the Church of Norway in Namsos Municipality in Trøndelag county, Norway. It is located in the village of Klinga. It is the church for the Klinga parish which is part of the Namdal prosti (deanery) in the Diocese of Nidaros. The white, wooden church was built in a long church style in 1866 using plans drawn up by the architects Ernst Kulaas and Jacob Wilhelm Nordan. The church seats about 270 people.

== History ==
The earliest existing historical records of the church date back to the year 1563, but the church was likely built during the 14th century. The first church building was a stave church that was located at Sævik, about 3 kilometres (1.9 mi) to the north of the present church site. Records from 1639 state that the church was very small and fragile, in need of supports for the exterior walls so they would not collapse in a storm. Shortly afterwards, around the year 1640, the choir was expanded. In 1705, the old church was torn down and replaced with a new, larger church on the same site. In 1863, a new church was built in the village of Klinga, about 3 kilometres (1.9 mi) to the south of the historic church site. The new church was consecrated on 7 March 1866. After the new church was put into use, the old church at Sævik was torn down and sold to a private individual who used the materials to build a jetty and boathouse in Namsos. During World War II, the church tower was dismantled (or reduced in size) by the Germans, presumably so that the church would not be a landmark for Allied airplanes. A new tower was designed by Arne Sørvik and was completed in 1948.

== Media gallery ==
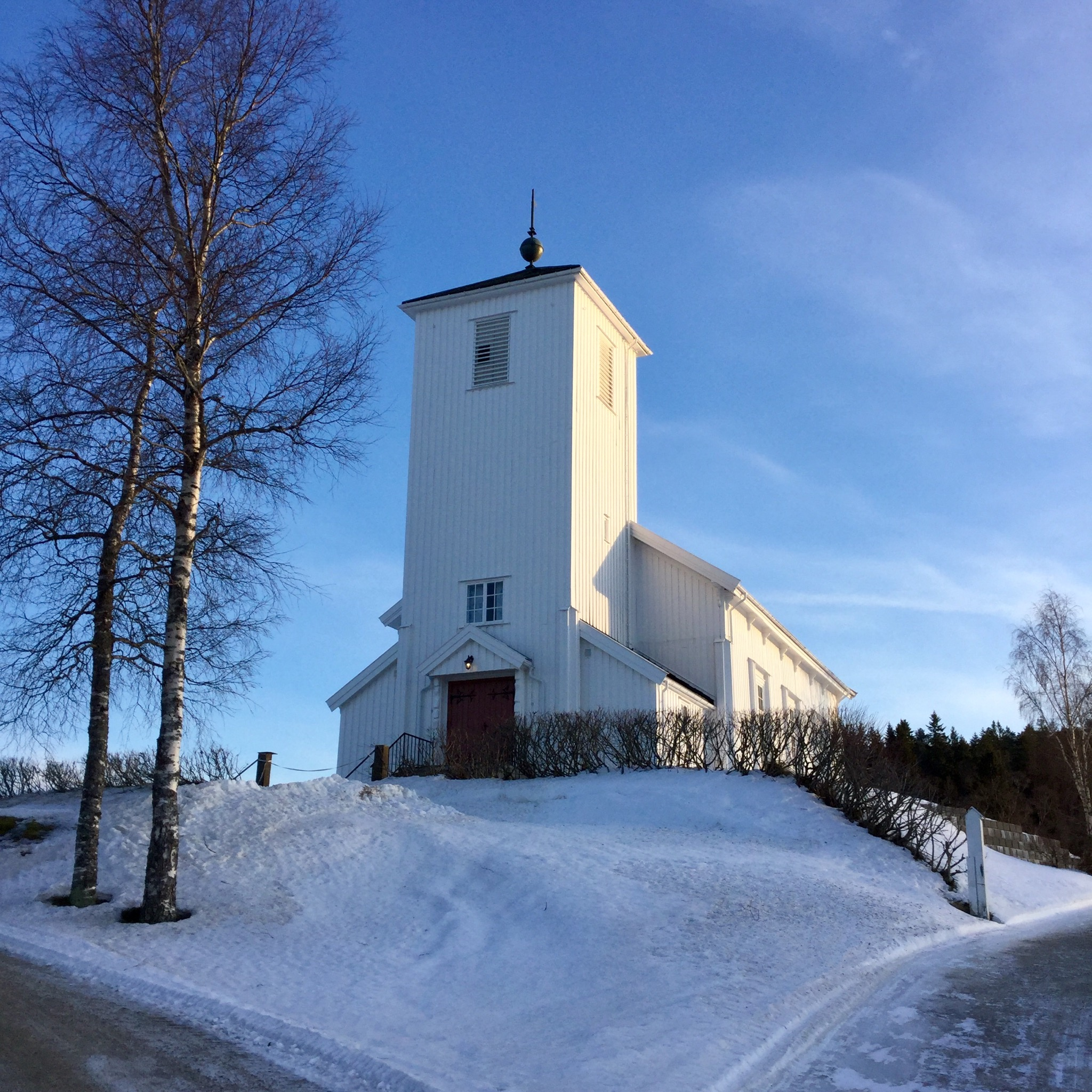

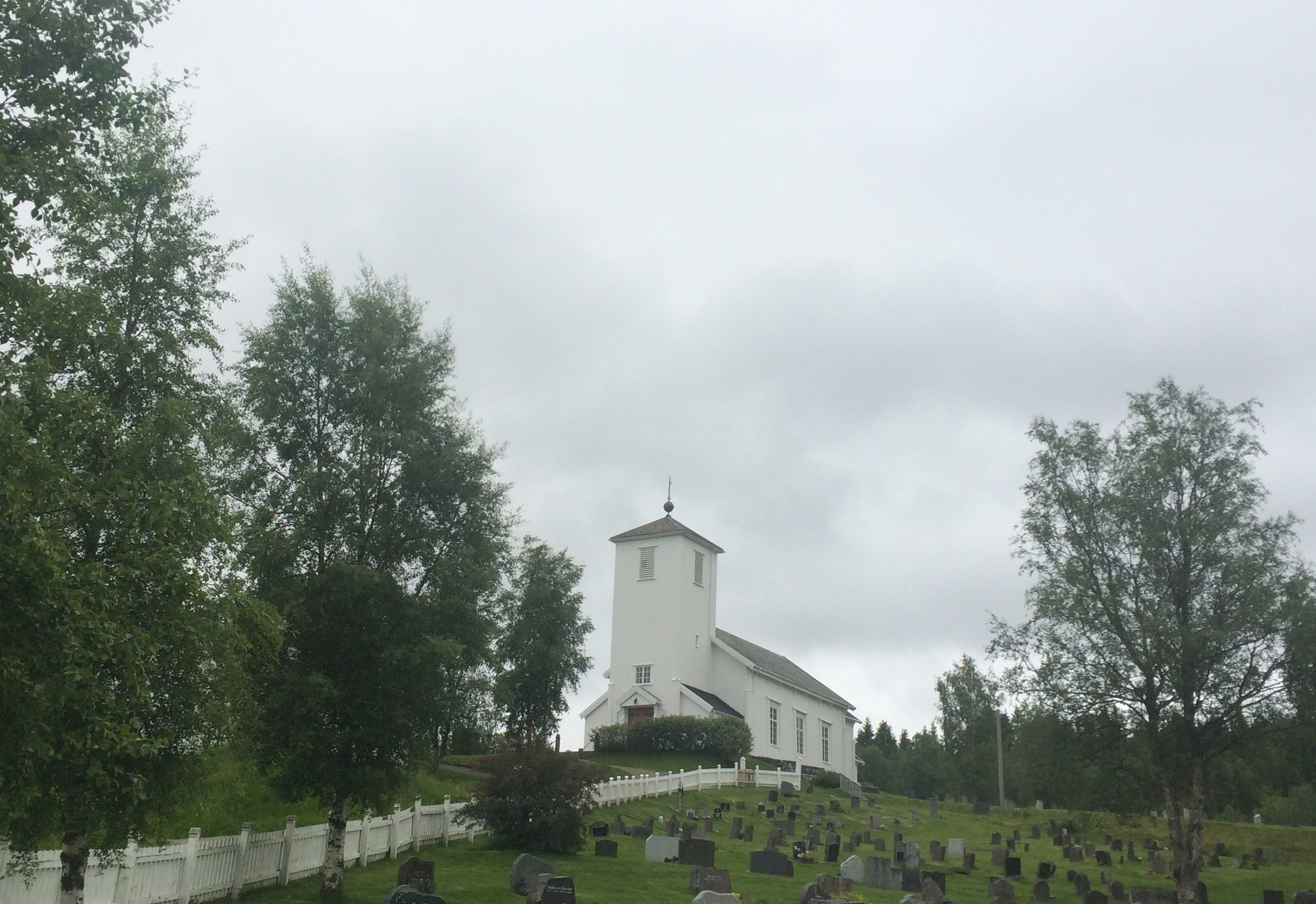

== See also ==
- List of churches in Nidaros
