= Namsos (town) =

Town in Namsos Municipality, Norway

- Town/City
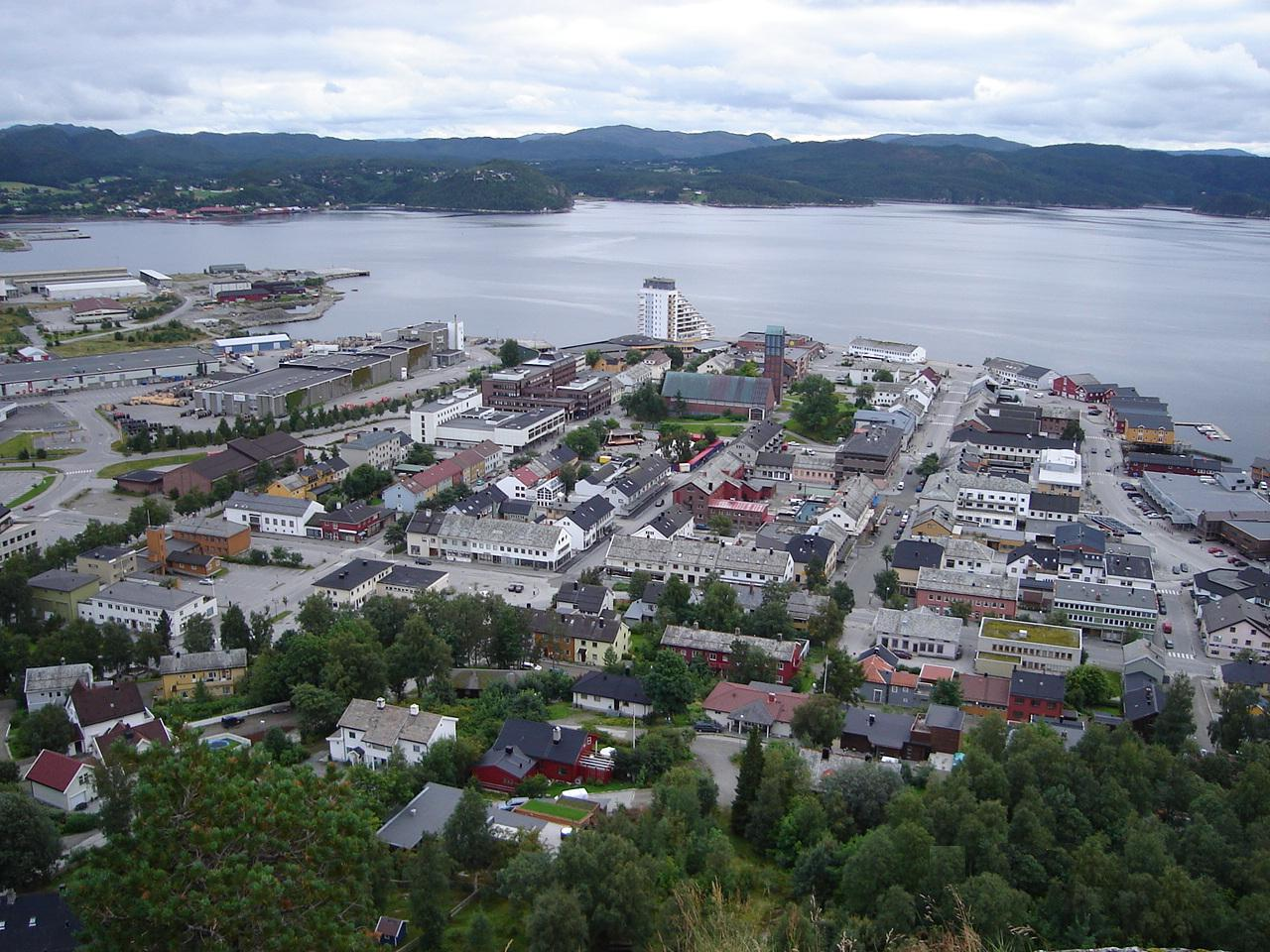
- View of the town
- Interactive map of Namsos
- Location within Trøndelag Location within Norway
- Coordinates: 64.4656°N 11.4978°E
- Country: Norway
- Region: Central Norway
- County: Trøndelag
- District: Namdalen
- Municipality: Namsos Municipality
- Established as
- Ladested: 1845

Area
  - Total: 4.66 km^{2} (1.80 sq mi)
- Elevation: 5 m (16 ft)

Population (2024)
  - Total: 8,422
  - Density: 1,807/km^{2} (4,680/sq mi)
- Demonym: Namsosing
- Time zone: UTC+01:00 (CET)
  - Summer (DST): UTC+02:00 (CEST)
- Post Code: 7800 Namsos

Namsos is a town and the administrative center of Namsos Municipality in Trøndelag county, Norway. It is located on the north side of the mouth of the river Namsen, where it flows into Namsenfjorden. The village of Spillum lies across the river on the south side.

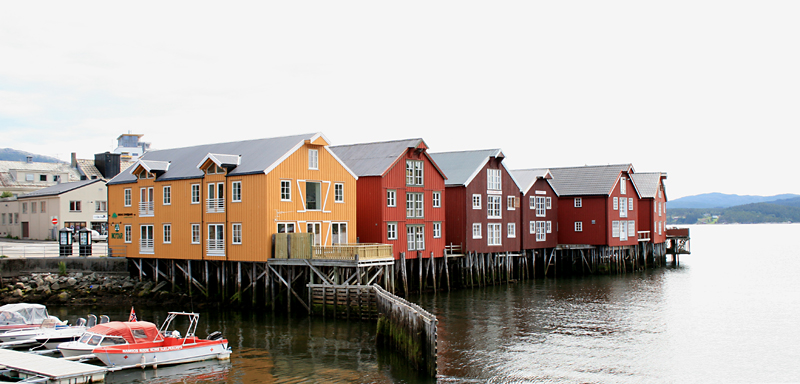
View of the waterfront

The Norwegian County Road 17 runs through the town and just east of the town is Namsos Airport, Høknesøra. The town was the terminus of the Namsos Line from 1933 until its closure in 2002. The town is the site of the Namsos Hospital which serves the whole region. Namsos Church is located in the town centre.

The 4.66-square-kilometre (1,150-acre) town has a population (2024) of 8,422 and a population density of 1,807 inhabitants per square kilometre (4,680/sq mi).

== History ==
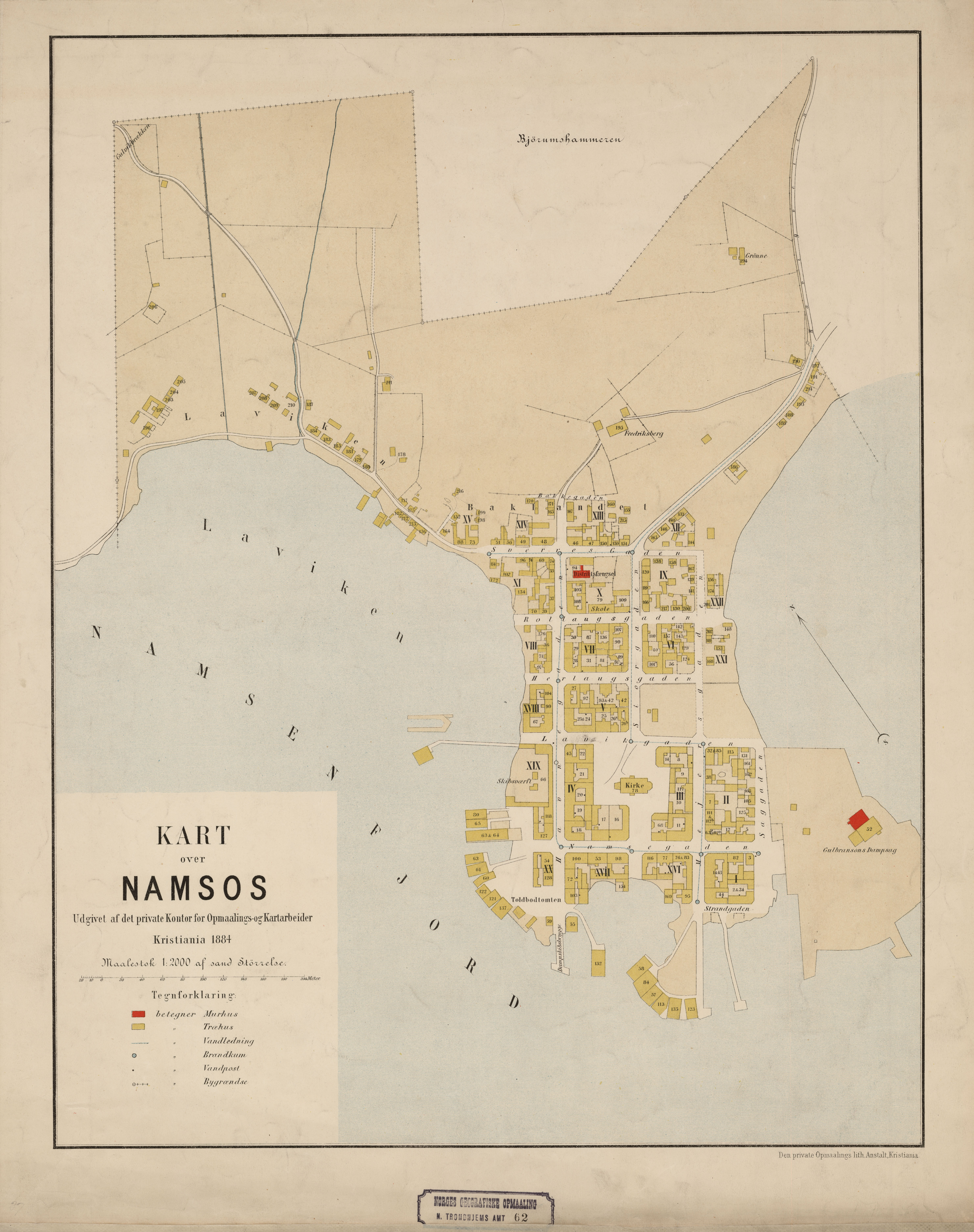
Map of Namsos in 1884

The village of Namsos was declared to be a ladested in 1845. At that time, it was separated from Vemundvik Municipality of which it was a part prior to that time. The new town, Ladested Namsos had 591 inhabitants and the rest of Vemundvik Municipality was then renamed Namsos herred (or Namsos landdistrikt) and it had 908 residents after the split.

Areas of Namsos herred lying adjacent to the town of Namsos were later annexed by the town on numerous occasions as the town grew. On 1 January 1882, an area with 109 inhabitants was moved to the town. On 1 July 1921 an area with 927 inhabitants was again transferred to Namsos. Then, on 1 July 1957, another area with a population of 6 was transferred to Namsos.

In 1940, the town was bombed in the Namsos Campaign during World War II.

During the 1960s, there were many municipal mergers across Norway due to the work of the Schei Committee. On 1 January 1964, there was a large municipal merger. The following neighboring areas were merged to form a new, larger Namsos Municipality with 10,875 residents.

- the town of Namsos (population: 5,224)
- all of Vemundvik Municipality (population: 2,040)
- all of Klinga Municipality (population: 2,482)
- the part of Otterøy Municipality located north of the Namsenfjorden (population: 1,013)
- the Finnangerodden area on the island of Otterøya in Fosnes Municipality (population: 116)

=== Name ===
The town is named Namsos, which is also the name of the municipality in which it is located. The town was named after its location at the mouth of the river Namsen. The first element of the name is Nams- which comes from the name of the river Namsen. The river name has an uncertain origin. The first part of the river name may come from the Old Norse word Nauma) which has an unknown meaning, but it may come from the word naust which means "boat". The second part of the river name (-sen) is derived from the word sær which means "sea". The last element of the town's name is óss which means the "mouth of a river".

=== Coat of arms ===

The coat of arms of the town of Namsos was granted on 5 May 1961 and they were in use by the town until 1 January 1964 when a large municipal merger took place. The arms were re-granted to Namsos Municipality on 21 October 1966 a couple years after the town was merged with several other areas to form the new municipality. The arms show a golden moose head on a red background. The elk was chosen as a symbol for the municipality, since Namsos is the capital of the forest-rich Namdalen region, and the moose is the "king of the forest".

== Media gallery ==
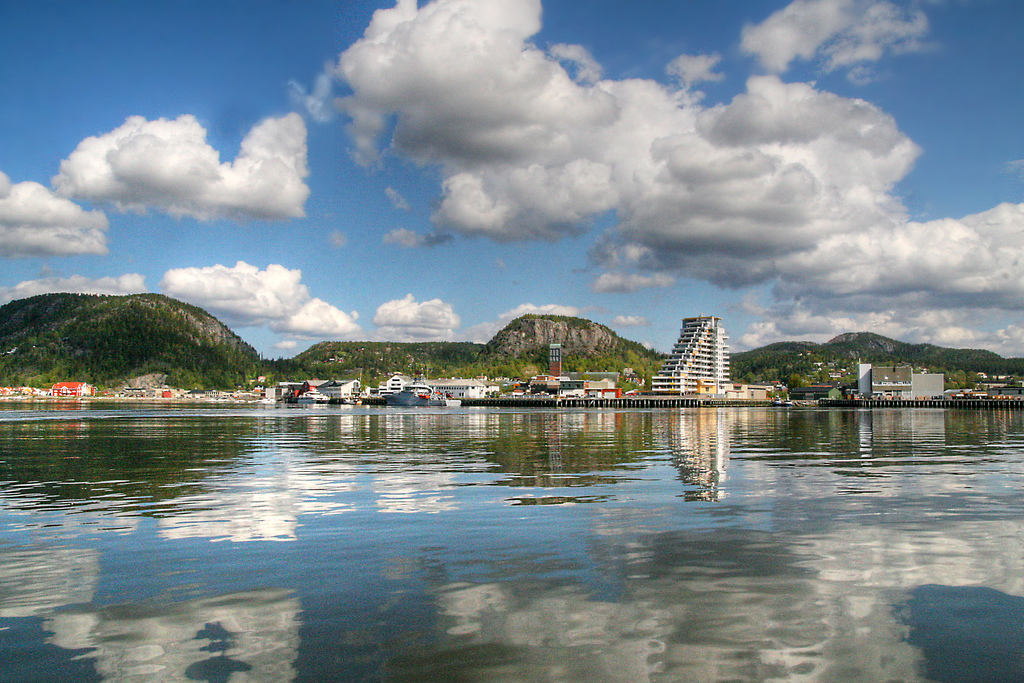
Namsos, seen from the fjord

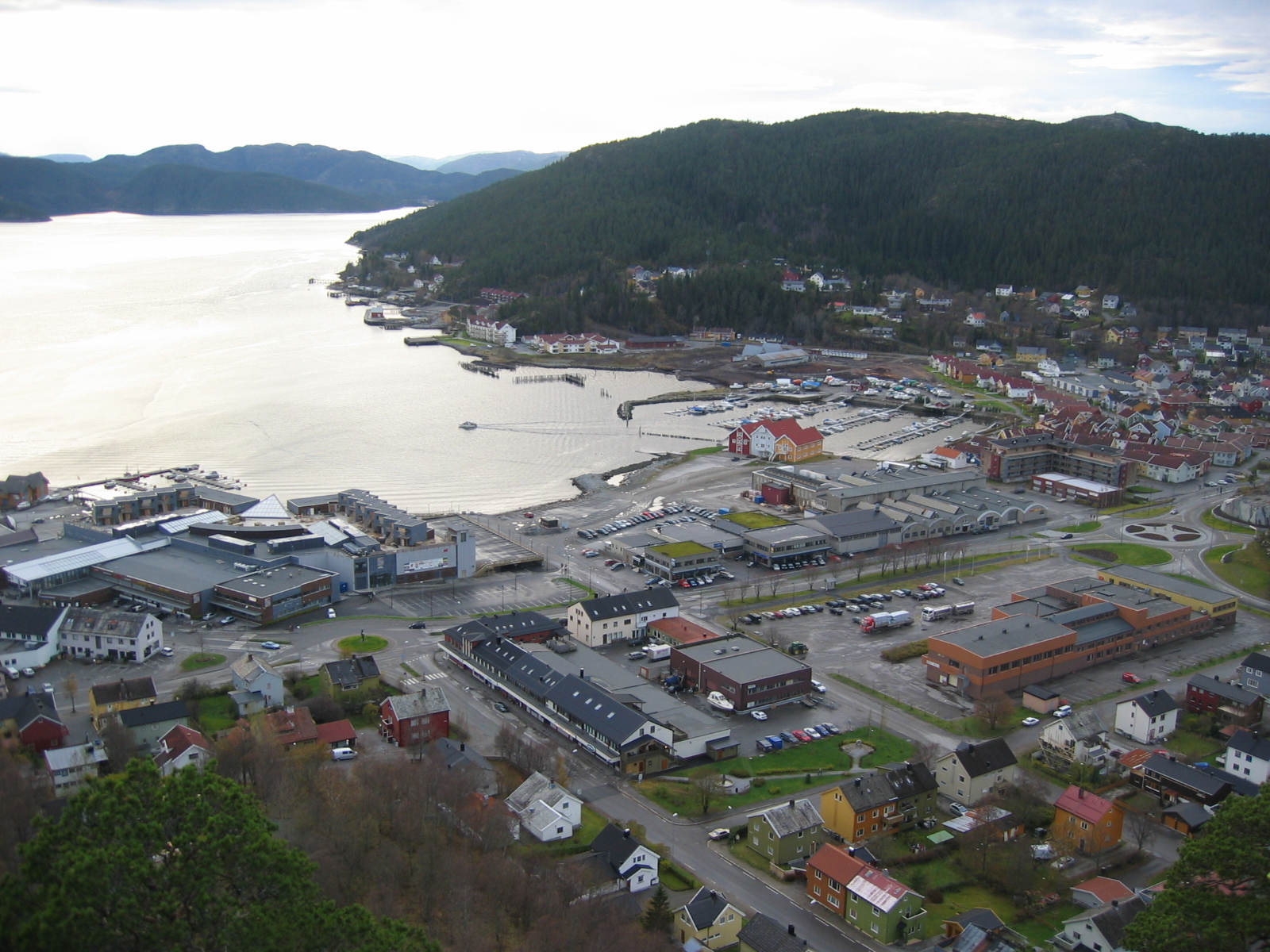
Namsos, seen from the mountain Klompen

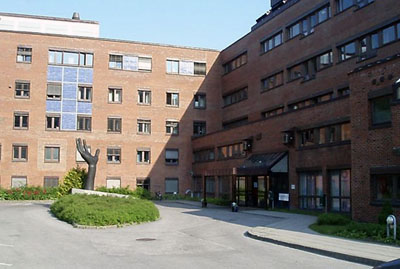
Namsos Hospital

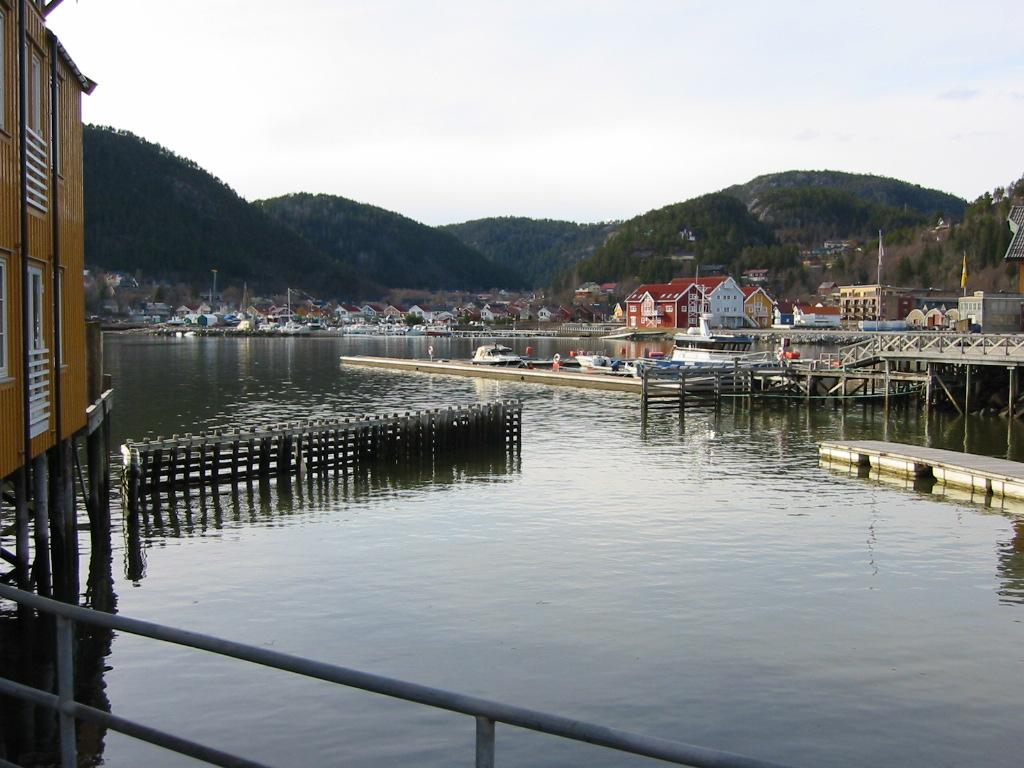
Waterfront

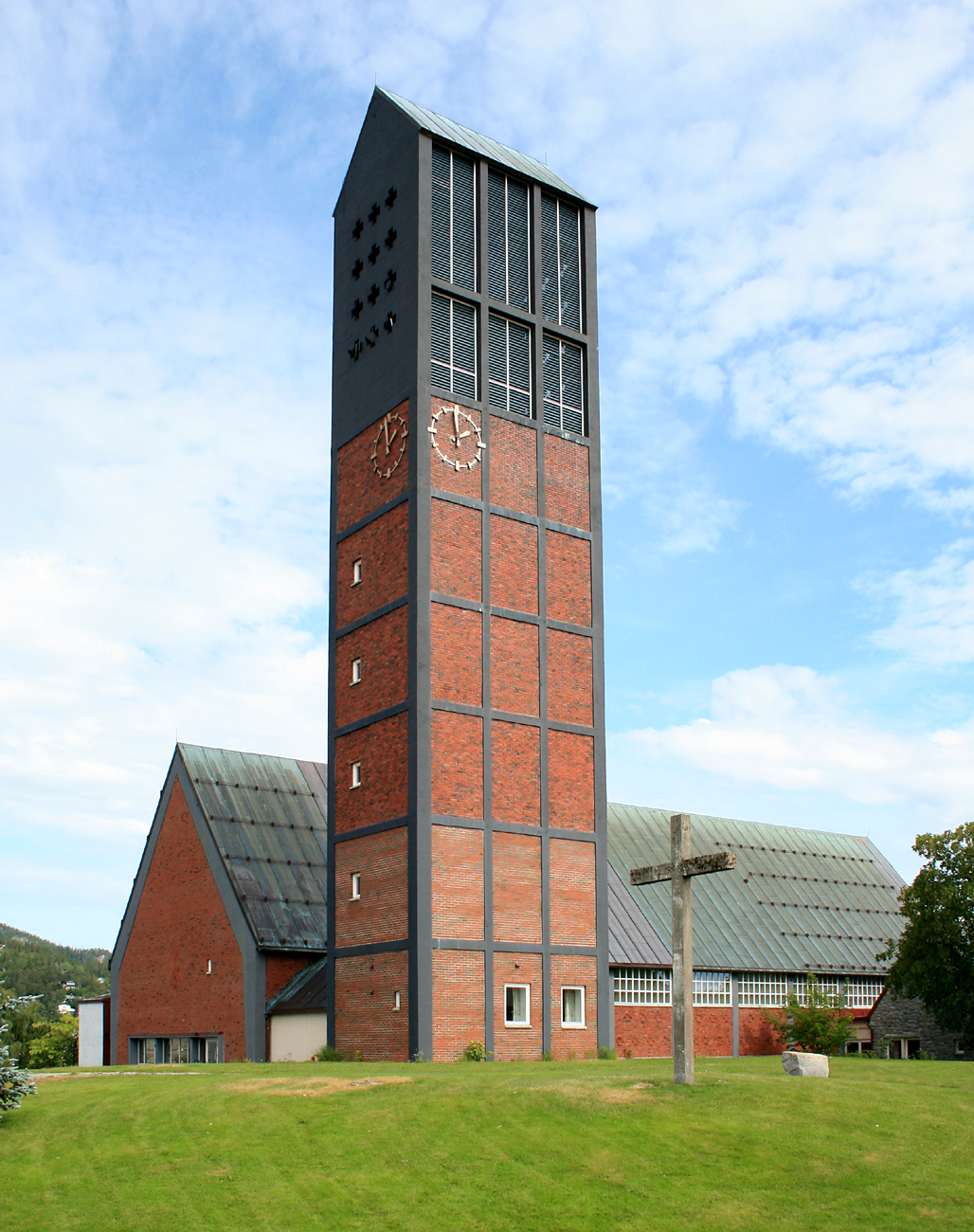
Namsos Church
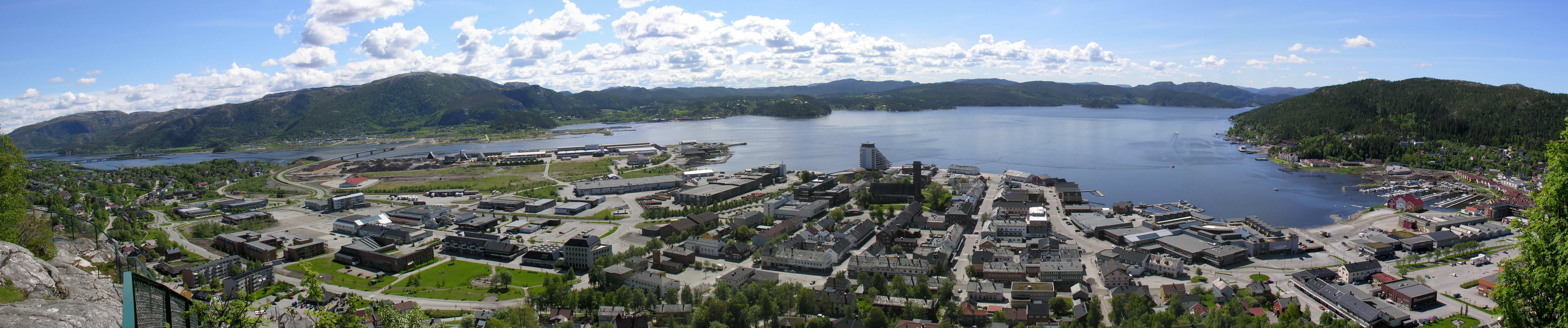
Panorama of the town of Namsos

== See also ==
- List of towns and cities in Norway
