= 1923 in Norway =

- Centuries: 18th; 19th; 20th; 21st
- Decades: 1900s; 1910s; 1920s; 1930s; 1940s
- See also: List of years in Norway

Events in the year 1923 in Norway.

== Incumbents ==
- Monarch – Haakon VII.

== Events ==
- The town of Mo i Rana is founded.
- The town of Brønnøysund is founded.
- Otto Blehr resigns as Prime Minister, along with his entire cabinet.
- 4 November – the Communist Party of Norway is formed, following a split in the Norwegian Labour Party.
- Fokstumyra Nature Reserve is established, the first nature reserve in Norway.

== Popular culture ==
=== Literature ===
- The Knut Hamsund novel Siste Kapitel Volume 1 & 2 (The Last Chapter), was published.
- The Olav Duun novel I stormen (The Storm) from the work Juvikfolket (The People of Juvik, 1918–23), was published.

== Births ==
=== January to March ===
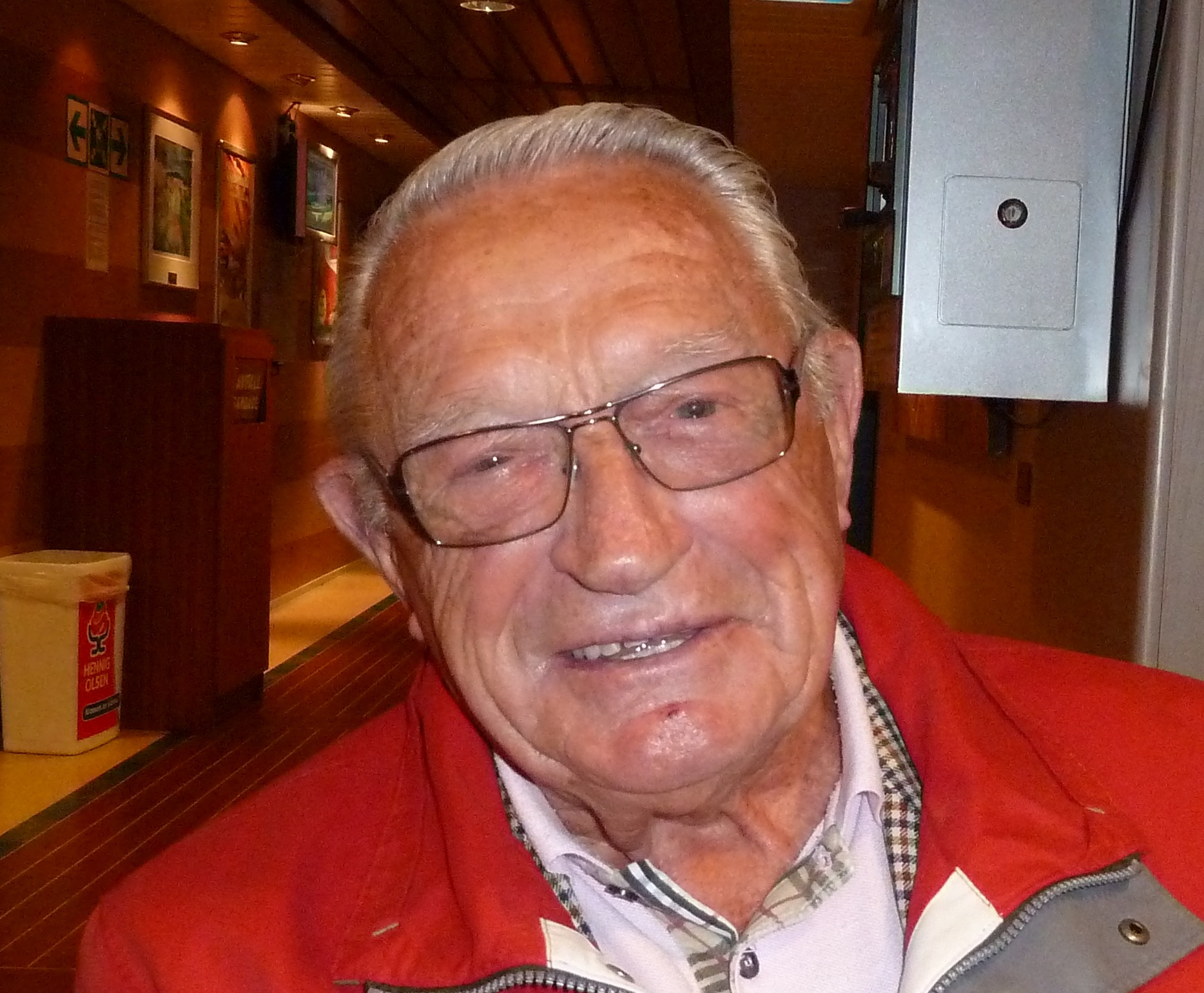
Hjalmar Andersen

- 1 January – Kristin Kverneland Lønningdal, politician (died 2010)
- 8 January – Odd Winger, journalist and writer (died 1998).
- 16 January – Martin Stokken, cross country skier and Olympic silver medallist, athlete (died 1984)
- 19 January – Dagmar Loe, journalist (died 2024).
- 22 January – Walter Kåre Tjønndal, politician (died 2014)
- 28 January – Erling Lorentzen, Norwegian-born businessman in Brazil (died 2021)
- 29 January – Leif Næss, rower and Olympic bronze medallist (died 1973)
- 5 February – Inger Waage, industrial ceramicist (died 1995)
- 7 February – Egil Abrahamsen, ships engineer (died 2023)
- 10 February – Hans Goksøyr, businessperson (died 2016)
- 10 February – Peder I. Ramsrud, politician (died 2014)
- 13 February – Jens P. Flå, politician (died 2002)
- 21 February – Gunnar Christie Wasberg, librarian and non-fiction writer (died 2015)
- 23 February – Jon Fossum, orienteer and politician (died 2007)
- 7 March – Johannes Vågsnes, politician (died 2012)
- 9 March – Pelle Christensen, actor and translator (died 1995)
- 12 March – Hjalmar Andersen, speed skater and triple Olympic gold medallist (died 2013)
- 12 March – Arne Asper, businessman (died 2017)
- 29 March – Eystein Bærug, politician (died 1998)

=== April to June ===
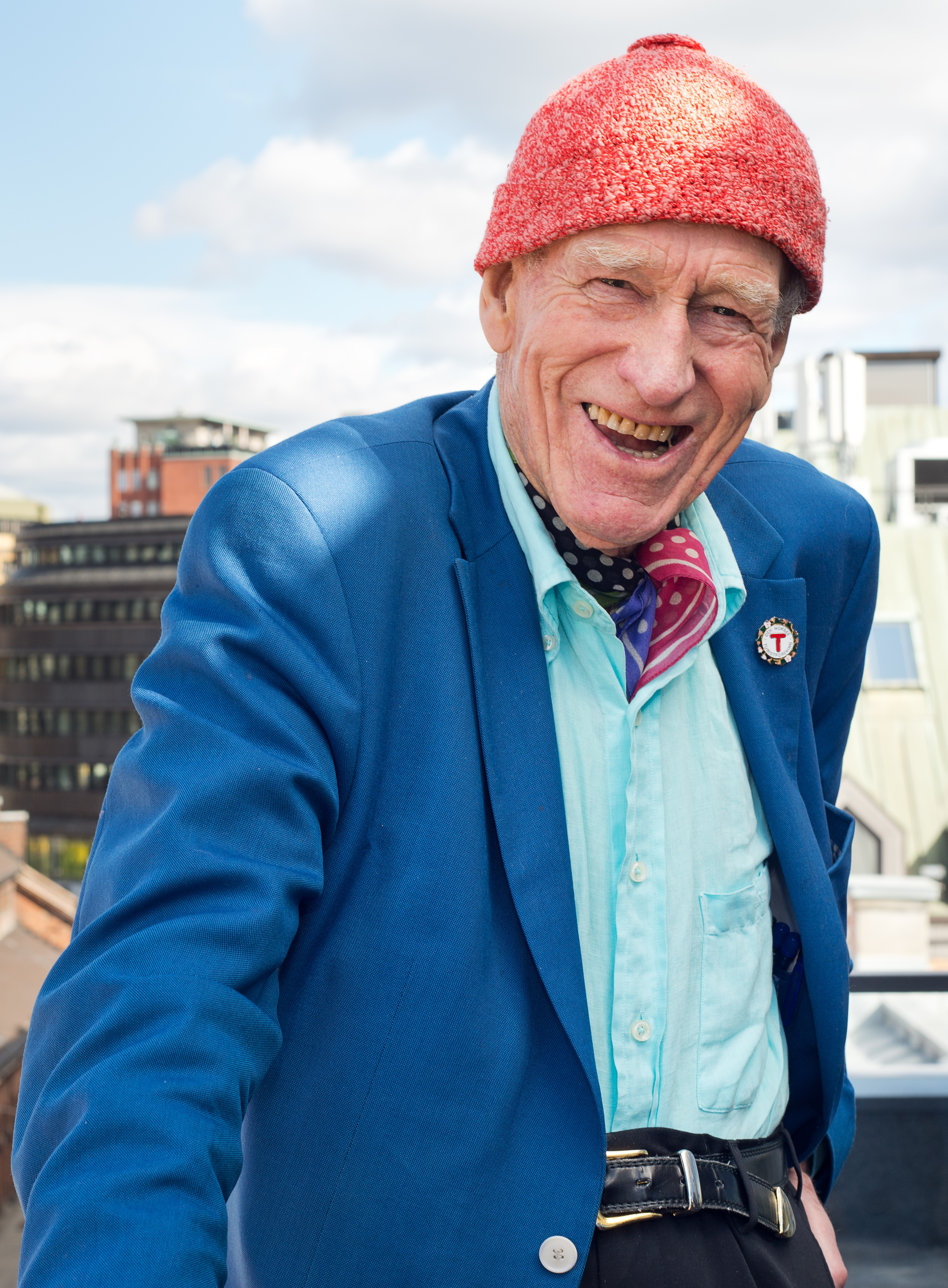
Olav Thon

- 4 April – Reidar Nyborg, cross country skier and Olympic bronze medallist (died 1990)
- 13 April – Per Kleppe, economist and politician (died 2021)
- 30 April – Einar Thorsrud, psychologist, researcher and professor (died 1985)
- 1 May – Anders John Aune, resistance member and politician (died 2011)
- 2 May – Albert Nordengen, politician (died 2004)
- 29 May – Harald Sverdrup, poet and children's writer (died 1992)
- 13 June – Mia Berner, philosopher, sociologist, and writer (died 2009).
- 14 June – Jakob Weidemann, painter (died 2001)
- 21 June – Bjørn Paulson, high jumper and Olympic silver medallist, jurist (died 2008)
- 22 June – Nils Slaatto, architect (died 2001)
- 29 June – Olav Thon, property developer (died 2024)

=== July to September ===
- 17 July – Wiggo Hanssen, speed skater (died 2007)
- 18 July – Odvar Omland, politician (died 2025)
- 26 July – Ole Frithjof Klemsdal, politician (died 2008)
- 1 August – Erling Stordahl, singer (died 1994)
- 12 August – Olle Johan Eriksen, politician (died 1999)
- 13 August – Arnljot Eggen, poet (died 2009).
- 17 August – Bjørn Erling Ytterhorn, politician (died 1987)
- 25 August – Stephan Tschudi-Madsen, art historian (died 2007)
- 30 August – Andreas Bernhard Gamst, politician (died 2015)
- 3 September – Egil Solin Ranheim, politician (died 1992)
- 9 September – Erling Rønneberg, politician (died 2008)
- 11 September – Leiv Magnus Vidvei, economist and politician (died 2016)
- 13 September – Gunnar Berg, politician (died 2007)
- 15 September – Rune Nilsen, triple jumper (died 1998)
- 17 September – Paal Brekke, writer (died 1993).
- 23 September – Egil Oddvar Larsen, politician (died 2009)

=== October to December ===
- 13 October – Eivind Bolle, politician and Minister (died 2012)
- 23 October – Sigmund Søfteland, speed skater (died 1993)
- 26 October – Johnny Lunde, alpine skier (died 2013)
- 7 November – Reidar Haave Olsen, pilot (died 1944)
- 10 November – Alf Martin Bjørnø, politician (died 1991)
- 24 November – Johan Vestly, illustrator (died 1993)
- 12 December – Frode Nilsen, diplomat (died 2016)
- 13 December – Ivar Johansen, journalist and editor (died 2005)
- 15 December – Petter Furberg, politician (died 1999)
- 15 December – Jon Ola Norbom, economist, politician and Minister (died 2020)
- 18 December – Sossen Krohg, playwright and stage and film actress (died 2016).
- 26 December – Rolf Hellem, politician (died 2021)
- 28 December – Georg Hille, clergyman (died 2023).
- 29 December – Helge Røstad, judge (died 1994)

=== Full date unknown ===
- Finn-Egil Eckblad, mycologist and professor (died 2000)

== Deaths ==
- 4 February – Svend Borchmann Hersleb Vogt, jurist and politician (born 1852)
- 9 February – Otto Aulie, footballer (born 1894)
- 16 March – Ulrikke Dahl, author (born 1846)
- 28 April – Knute Nelson, Governor of Minnesota from 1893 till 1895 and United States Senator from Minnesota from 1895 till 1923 (born 1843)
- 23 May – Otto Bahr Halvorsen, politician and twice Prime Minister of Norway (born 1872)
- 22 June – Edvard Sverdrup, theologian (born 1861)
- 28 July – Christian Emil Stoud Platou, railroad director and politician (born 1861)
- 11 September – Ole Østmo, rifle shooter and Olympic medallist (born 1866)
- 23 September – Carl L. Boeckmann, artist (born 1867)
- 2 November – Claus Høyer, rower and Olympic bronze medallist (born 1891)
- 16 November – Christen Christensen, shipyard owner, ship-owner and whaling manager (born 1845)
- 19 November – Ivar Bergersen Sælen, politician and Minister (born 1855)
