= 1921 in Norway =

- Centuries: 18th; 19th; 20th; 21st
- Decades: 1900s; 1910s; 1920s; 1930s; 1940s
- See also: List of years in Norway

Events in the year 1921 in Norway.

== Incumbents ==
- Monarch – Haakon VII.

== Events ==
- 6 May – A general strike begins in Norway.
- 17 September – the Dovre Line was opened.
- 18 September – Nidareid train disaster on the Trondhjem-Størenbanen railway line. Six people were killed in this, the first serious passenger train accident in Norway
- The 1921 Parliamentary election takes place.
- Mandal received city rights.

== Popular culture ==
=== Sports ===
- Harald Strøm, speedskater and football player, becomes the third to receive the Egebergs Ærespris, an award presented to Norwegian athletes who excel at two (or more) different sports.

=== Literature ===
- The Olav Duun novel I eventyret (Odin in Fairyland) from the work Juvikfolket (The People of Juvik, 1918–23), was published.

== Notable births ==
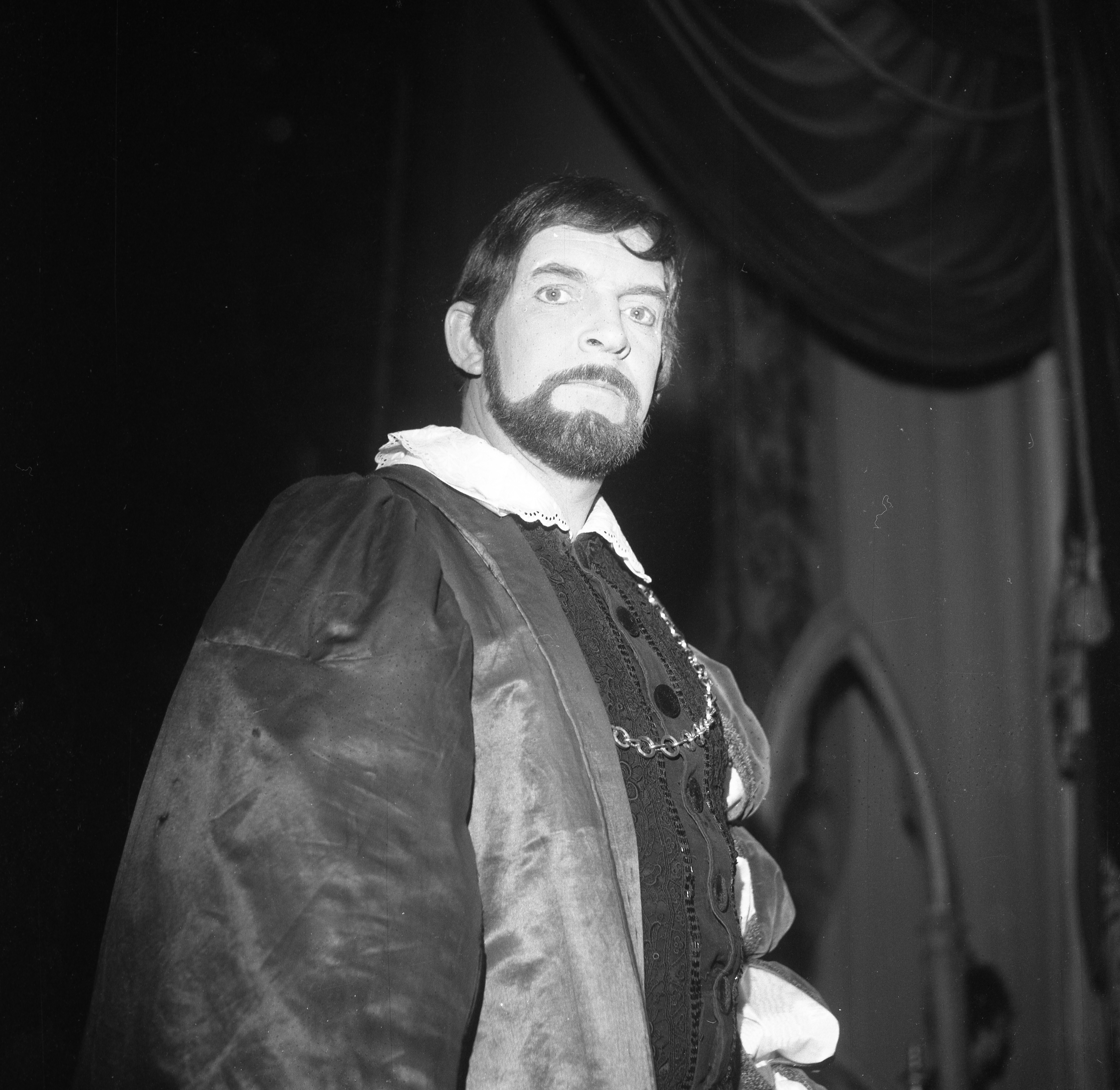
Kjell Stormoen

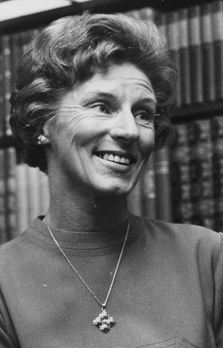
Babbis Friis-Baastad

- 3 January – Mosse Jørgensen, school principal and non-fiction writer (died 2009).
- 5 January – Odd Højdahl, trade unionist, politician and Minister (died 1994)
- 6 January – Hans Aardal, politician (died 1995)
- 15 January – Kristian Ottosen, writer and public servant (died 2006)
- 4 February – Valter Gabrielsen, politician (died 1999)
- 27 February – Eigil Gullvåg, newspaper editor and politician (died 1991)
- 9 March – Wanda Hjort Heger, social worker (died 2017)
- 21 March – Vibeke Lunde, sailor and Olympic silver medallist (died 1962).
- 24 March – Kjell Stormoen, actor, scenographer and theatre director (died 2010)
- 25 March – Fredrik Jensen, member of the German Waffen-SS (died 2011)
- 27 March – Vidkunn Hveding, politician and Minister (died 2001)
- 5 April – Jan Dahm, resistance member (died 2013).
- 6 April – Erland Asdahl, politician (died 1988)
- 7 April – Erling Sandene, judge and civil servant (died 2015)
- 9 April – Asbjørn Antoni Holm, politician (died 2001)
- 23 April – Ola H. Kveli, politician (died 2003)
- 9 May – Sverre Moen, politician (died 1987)
- 14 May – Arve Opsahl, film and stage actor, singer and stand-up comedian (died 2007)
- 16 May – Odd With, politician (died 2006)
- 27 May – Thor Lund, politician (died 1999)
- 5 June – Rolf Gjermundsen, politician (died 1994)
- 11 June – Einar Hole Moxnes, politician and Minister (died 2006)
- 15 June – Harald Sverre Olsen, politician (died 2020)
- 27 June – Frank Weylert, actor and singer (died 2007)
- 30 June – Gunvor Hofmo, writer and poet (died 1995)
- 10 July – Eva Kløvstad, resistance leader (died 2014)
- 11 July – Petter Hugsted, ski jumper and Olympic gold medallist (died 2000)
- 13 July – Carl Monssen, rower and Olympic bronze medallist (died 1992)
- 17 July – Knut Thomassen, actor and theatre director (died 2002).
- 15 August – Nils Christensen, aviator and aircraft engineer (died 2017)
- 27 August – Babbis Friis-Baastad, children's writer (died 1970).
- 23 September – Annemarie Lorentzen, politician and Minister (died 2008)
- 28 September – Åge Ramberg, politician (died 1991)
- 8 October – Odd Mæhlum, javelin thrower (died 2011)
- 10 October – Gunnar Thoresen, bobsledder (died 1972)
- 17 October – Edel Hætta Eriksen, schoolteacher and politician (died 2023).
- 11 November – Trygve Olsen, politician (died 1979)
- 15 November – Thorleif Olsen, footballer (died 1996).
- 27 November – Aud Alvær, politician (died 2000)
- 28 November – Olav Hagen, cross country skier and Olympic bronze medallist (died 2013)
- 24 December – Birger Dannevig, journalist and historian (died 1998).
- 25 December – Gunnar S. Gundersen, painter (died 1983)

== Notable deaths ==
- 8 February – Francis Hagerup, lawyer, diplomat, politician and twice Prime Minister of Norway (born 1853)
- 25 February – Elizabeth Fedde, Lutheran Deaconess who established the Norwegian Relief Society (born 1850)
- 4 May – Waldemar Hansteen, architect (born 1857)
- 22 June – Gjert Holsen, politician (born 1855)
- 21 July – Lars Kristian Abrahamsen, politician and Minister (born 1855)
- 25 July – Peder Nilsen, politician and Minister (born 1846)
- 19 September – Erik Glosimodt, architect (born 1881)

=== Full date unknown ===
- Nils S. Dvergsdal, politician (born 1842)
