= Fosnes =

Fosnes may refer to:

== People ==
- Jeff Fosnes, a former American basketball player
- Erik Fosnes Hansen, a Norwegian writer

== Places ==
- Fosnes Municipality, a former municipality in Trøndelag county, Norway
- Fosnes Chapel, a church in Namsos Municipality in Trøndelag county, Norway
- Fosnes, Namsos, a village on the island of Jøa in Namsos Municipality in Trøndelag county, Norway

== See also ==
- Fossnes, a village in Sandefjord Municipality in Vestfold county, Norway
