= Fosnes Municipality =

Former municipality in Trøndelag, Norway

Fosnes Municipality Fosnes kommune
- Former municipality
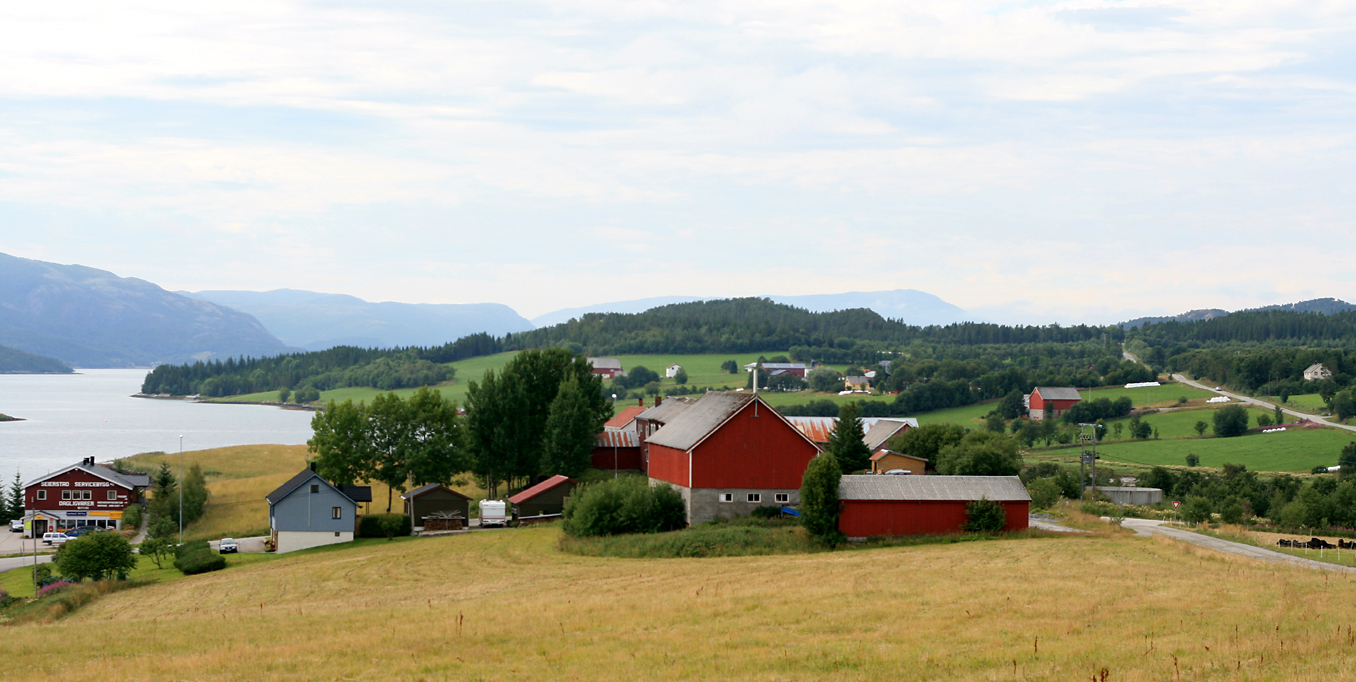
- View of Seierstad on Jøa island

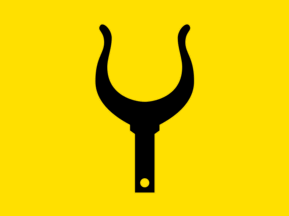
- Flag Coat of arms

- Trøndelag within Norway

- Fosnes within Trøndelag
- Coordinates: 64°41′02″N 11°34′09″E
- Country: Norway
- County: Trøndelag
- District: Namdalen
- Established: 1 Jan 1838
  - Created as: Formannskapsdistrikt
- Disestablished: 1 Jan 2020
  - Succeeded by: Namsos Municipality
- Administrative centre: Dun

Government
  - Mayor (2007-2019): Bjørg Tingstad (Sp)

Area (upon dissolution)
  - Total: 544.27 km^{2} (210.14 sq mi)
  - Land: 473.43 km^{2} (182.79 sq mi)
  - Water: 70.84 km^{2} (27.35 sq mi) 13%
  - Rank: #199 in Norway
- Highest elevation: 765 m (2,510 ft)

Population (2019)
  - Total: 605
  - Rank: #413 in Norway
  - Density: 1.1/km^{2} (2.8/sq mi)
  - Change (10 years): ▼ −11%
- Demonym: Fosnesbygg

Official language
  - Norwegian form: Bokmål
- Time zone: UTC+01:00 (CET)
  - Summer (DST): UTC+02:00 (CEST)
- ISO 3166 code: NO-5048

Fosnes is a former municipality in Trøndelag county, Norway. The municipality existed from 1838 until its dissolution in 2020 when it was merged into Namsos Municipality. It was part of the Namdalen region. The administrative centre of the municipality was the village of Dun on the island of Jøa. Other villages include Salsnes and Nufsfjord.

At the time of its dissolution in 2020, the 544-square-kilometre (210 sq mi) municipality was the 199th largest by area out of the 422 municipalities in Norway. Fosnes Municipality was the 413th most populous municipality in Norway with a population of 605. The municipality's population density was 1.1 inhabitants per square kilometre (2.8/sq mi) and its population had decreased by 11% over the last decade.

== General information ==
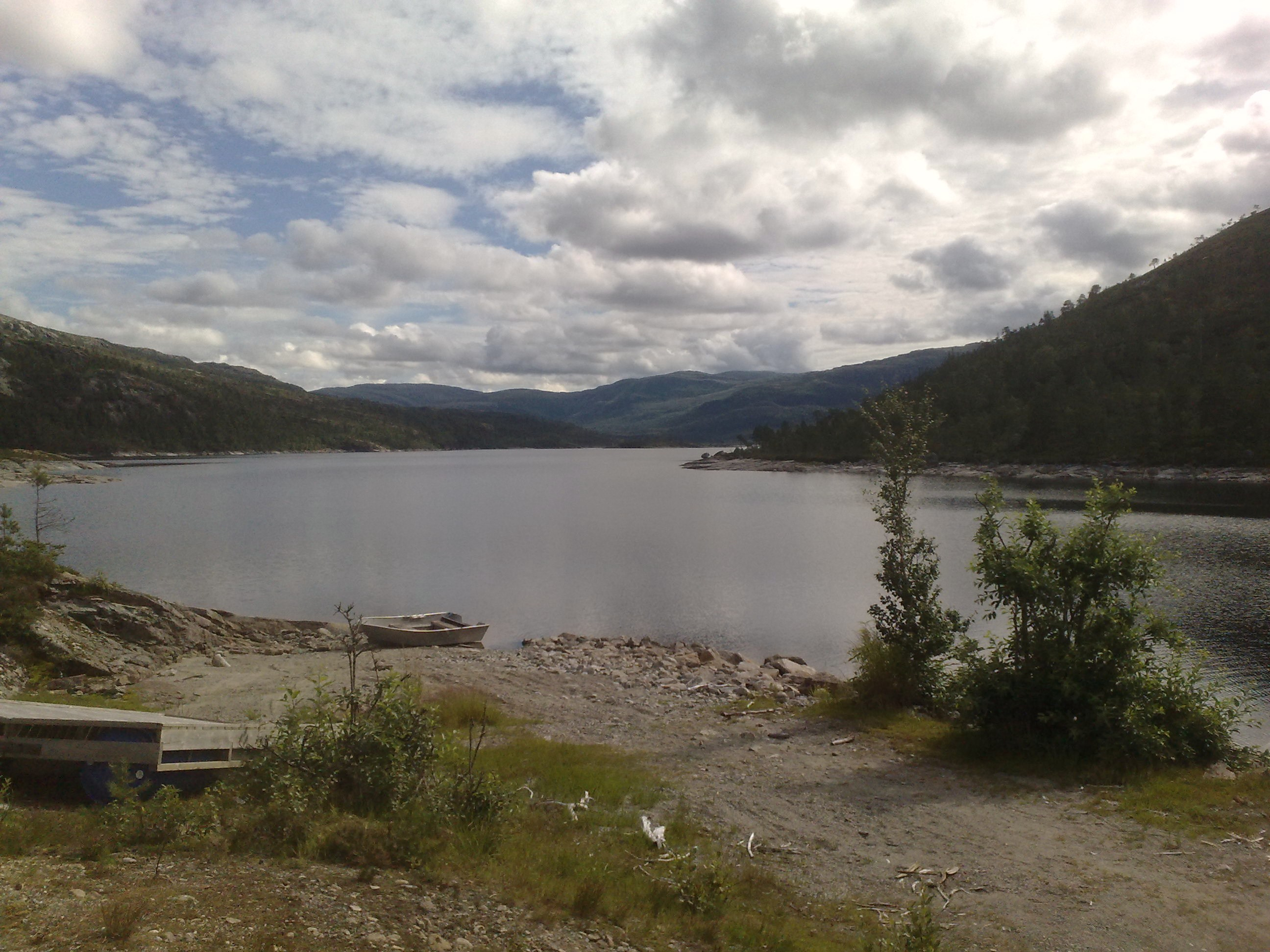
View of Mjosund

Fosnes was established as a municipality in the old Nord-Trøndelag county on 1 January 1838 (see formannskapsdistrikt law). On 1 January 1871, the western district of Fosnes Municipality (population: 1,472) was separated to form the new Flatanger Municipality. This left Fosnes Municipality with 2,655 residents. On 1 January 1889, a small area of Fosnes Municipality (population: 61) was transferred to the neighboring Vikten Municipality. Then on 1 January 1913, the western part of Fosnes Municipality (population: 1,631) was separated to form the new Otterøy Municipality. This left the much smaller Fosnes Municipality with 1,107 residents.

During the 1960s, there were many municipal mergers across Norway due to the work of the Schei Committee. On 1 January 1964, the Finnanger area of Fosnes Municipality on the northern part of the island of Otterøya (population: 116) was transferred to Namsos Municipality.

In 2018, it became part of the new Trøndelag county which replaced the old Nord-Trøndelag county. On 1 January 2020, Fosnes Municipality became a part of the neighboring Namsos Municipality. This happened because on 16 June 2016 Fosnes Municipality, Namsos Municipality, and Namdalseid Municipality voted to merge into a new, larger municipality as part of a large municipal reform across Norway.

=== Name ===
The municipality (originally the parish) is named after the old Fosnes farm (Old Norse: Fólgsnnes), since the first Fosnes Church was built there (Fosnes Chapel is now located on the site). The first element is fólgsn which means "hiding place", referring to an inlet behind the farm, where ships could not be seen from the main fjord. The last element is nes which means "headland". Historically, the name was spelled Fosnæs.

=== Coat of arms ===
The coat of arms was granted on 13 November 1992 and it was in use until 1 January 2020 when the municipality was merged into Namsos. The official blazon is "Or, a rowlock sable" (Norwegian: I gull en svart åregaffel). This means the arms have a field (background) that has a tincture of Or which means it is commonly colored yellow, but if it is made out of metal, then gold is used. The charge is a oarlock from a rowing boat. The design was chosen to symbolize the importance of the sea for this coastal municipality where rowing boats were the main form of transportation in the former centuries. The arms were designed by Even Jarl Skoglund.

The first proposal for a coat of arms for Fosnes date back to 1989 when the municipal council launched a contest to develop a coat of arms. Several proposals were received, but none of them were acceptable to the council nor were they acceptable to the Norwegian Heraldry Society which determined the proposals were not made according to heraldic rules. Finally the Society proposed the current coat of arms, which was acceptable to the municipal council.

=== Churches ===
The Church of Norway had one parish (sokn) within Fosnes Municipality. It was part of the Namdal prosti (deanery) in the Diocese of Nidaros.

Churches in Fosnes Municipality
Parish (sokn)	Church name	Location of the church	Year built
Fosnes	Dun Church	Dun	1949
Fosnes	Fosnes Chapel	Fosnesvågen on Jøa	1926
Fosnes	Salen Chapel	Salsnes	1953

== Geography ==
Fosnes was a coastal municipality located along the Foldafjord, north of the town of Namsos. The municipality included the island of Jøa, part of the island of Elvalandet, and part of the mainland. The second deepest lake in Europe, Salvatnet, and the lake Mjosundvatnet are both located in the eastern part of the municipality. The highest point in the municipality was the 765-metre (2,510 ft) tall mountain Grønkleppen.

== Government ==
While it existed, Fosnes Municipality was responsible for primary education (through 10th grade), outpatient health services, senior citizen services, welfare and other social services, zoning, economic development, and municipal roads and utilities. The municipality was governed by a municipal council of directly elected representatives. The mayor was indirectly elected by a vote of the municipal council. The municipality was under the jurisdiction of the Namdal District Court and the Frostating Court of Appeal.

Municipal waste management was since 1994 handled by the inter-municipal Midtre Namdal Avfallsselskap.

=== Municipal council ===
The municipal council (Herredsstyre) of Fosnes Municipality was made up of 13 representatives that were elected to four year terms. The tables below show the historical composition of the council by political party.

Fosnes kommunestyre 2015–2019
Party name (in Norwegian)	Number of representatives
Labour Party (Arbeiderpartiet)	4
Joint list of the Centre Party (Senterpartiet) and the Christian Democratic Party (Kristelig Folkeparti)	7
Local List(s) (Lokale lister)	2
Total number of members:	13
Note: On 1 January 2020, Fosnes Municipality became part of Namsos Municipality.

Fosnes kommunestyre 2011–2015
Party name (in Norwegian)	Number of representatives
Labour Party (Arbeiderpartiet)	5
Joint list of the Centre Party (Senterpartiet) and the Christian Democratic Party (Kristelig Folkeparti)	10
Total number of members:	13

Fosnes kommunestyre 2007–2011
Party name (in Norwegian)	Number of representatives
Labour Party (Arbeiderpartiet)	6
Joint list of the Centre Party (Senterpartiet) and the Christian Democratic Party (Kristelig Folkeparti)	9
Total number of members:	15

Fosnes kommunestyre 2003–2007
Party name (in Norwegian)	Number of representatives
Labour Party (Arbeiderpartiet)	7
Joint list of the Centre Party (Senterpartiet) and the Christian Democratic Party (Kristelig Folkeparti)	8
Green local list (Grønn Bygdaliste)	2
Total number of members:	17

Fosnes kommunestyre 1999–2003
Party name (in Norwegian)	Number of representatives
Labour Party (Arbeiderpartiet)	5
Joint list of the Centre Party (Senterpartiet) and the Christian Democratic Party (Kristelig Folkeparti)	10
Green local list (Grønn bygdeliste)	2
Total number of members:	17

Fosnes kommunestyre 1995–1999
Party name (in Norwegian)	Number of representatives
Labour Party (Arbeiderpartiet)	6
Centre Party (Senterpartiet)	7
Joint list of the Conservative Party, Christian Democratic Party, and independents (Fellesliste for Høyre, Kristelig Folkeparti og uavhengig)	2
Green local list (Grønn Bygdaliste)	2
Total number of members:	17

Fosnes kommunestyre 1991–1995
Party name (in Norwegian)	Number of representatives
Labour Party (Arbeiderpartiet)	5
Joint list of the Conservative Party (Høyre), Christian Democratic Party (Kristelig Folkeparti), and Centre Party (Senterpartiet)	10
Green local list (Grønn Bygdaliste)	2
Total number of members:	17

Fosnes kommunestyre 1987–1991
Party name (in Norwegian)	Number of representatives
Labour Party (Arbeiderpartiet)	6
Joint list of the Conservative Party (Høyre), Christian Democratic Party (Kristelig Folkeparti), and Centre Party (Senterpartiet)	11
Total number of members:	17

Fosnes kommunestyre 1984–1987
Party name (in Norwegian)	Number of representatives
Labour Party (Arbeiderpartiet)	5
Conservative Party (Høyre)	1
Joint list of the Centre Party (Senterpartiet) and the Christian Democratic Party (Kristelig Folkeparti)	6
Socialist Unity List (Sosialistisk Enhetslista)	1
Total number of members:	13

Fosnes kommunestyre 1979–1983
Party name (in Norwegian)	Number of representatives
Labour Party (Arbeiderpartiet)	4
Joint List(s) of Non-Socialist Parties (Borgerlige Felleslister)	8
Socialist Unity List (Sosialistisk Enhetsliste)	1
Total number of members:	13

Fosnes kommunestyre 1975–1979
Party name (in Norwegian)	Number of representatives
Labour Party (Arbeiderpartiet)	4
Joint list of the Centre Party (Senterpartiet) and the Christian Democratic Party (Kristelig Folkeparti)	9
Total number of members:	13

Fosnes kommunestyre 1971–1975
Party name (in Norwegian)	Number of representatives
Labour Party (Arbeiderpartiet)	5
Socialist People's Party (Sosialistisk Folkeparti)	1
Joint List(s) of Non-Socialist Parties (Borgerlige Felleslister)	7
Total number of members:	13

Fosnes kommunestyre 1967–1971
Party name (in Norwegian)	Number of representatives
Labour Party (Arbeiderpartiet)	3
Socialist People's Party (Sosialistisk Folkeparti)	2
Joint List(s) of Non-Socialist Parties (Borgerlige Felleslister)	8
Total number of members:	13

Fosnes kommunestyre 1963–1967
Party name (in Norwegian)	Number of representatives
Labour Party (Arbeiderpartiet)	5
Joint List(s) of Non-Socialist Parties (Borgerlige Felleslister)	8
Total number of members:	13

Fosnes herredsstyre 1959–1963
Party name (in Norwegian)	Number of representatives
Labour Party (Arbeiderpartiet)	6
Joint List(s) of Non-Socialist Parties (Borgerlige Felleslister)	6
Local List(s) (Lokale lister)	1
Total number of members:	13

Fosnes herredsstyre 1955–1959
Party name (in Norwegian)	Number of representatives
Labour Party (Arbeiderpartiet)	5
Joint List(s) of Non-Socialist Parties (Borgerlige Felleslister)	6
Local List(s) (Lokale lister)	2
Total number of members:	13

Fosnes herredsstyre 1951–1955
Party name (in Norwegian)	Number of representatives
Labour Party (Arbeiderpartiet)	6
Joint List(s) of Non-Socialist Parties (Borgerlige Felleslister)	5
Local List(s) (Lokale lister)	1
Total number of members:	12

Fosnes herredsstyre 1947–1951
Party name (in Norwegian)	Number of representatives
Labour Party (Arbeiderpartiet)	5
List of workers, fishermen, and small farmholders (Arbeidere, fiskere, småbrukere liste)	1
Joint List(s) of Non-Socialist Parties (Borgerlige Felleslister)	6
Total number of members:	12

Fosnes herredsstyre 1945–1947
Party name (in Norwegian)	Number of representatives
Labour Party (Arbeiderpartiet)	6
Local List(s) (Lokale lister)	6
Total number of members:	12

Fosnes herredsstyre 1937–1941*
Party name (in Norwegian)	Number of representatives
Labour Party (Arbeiderpartiet)	4
List of workers, fishermen, and small farmholders (Arbeidere, fiskere, småbrukere liste)	1
Local List(s) (Lokale lister)	7
Total number of members:	12
Note: Due to the German occupation of Norway during World War II, no elections were held for new municipal councils until after the war ended in 1945.

=== Mayors ===
The mayor (Norwegian: ordfører) of Fosnes Municipality was the political leader of the municipality and the chairperson of the municipal council. Here is a list of people who held this position:

- 1838–1841: Peter Hersleb Graah Birkeland
- 1842–1843: Mathias Krog
- 1844–1845: Elias Bedsvåg
- 1846–1847: O.H. Wedege
- 1848–1849: Johan Peter Berg
- 1850–1853: Elias Bedsvåg
- 1854–1857: P.M. Aglen
- 1858–1861: Elias Bedsvåg
- 1862–1865: O. Soelberg
- 1866–1870: Olaus Wedege
- 1871–1873: O. Soelberg
- 1874–1878: Emil Ellefsen
- 1879–1887: Andreas Hamnes
- 1888–1890: Peder Aglen (H)
- 1891–1901: Olaus Kjølstad (V)
- 1902–1905: Peder Aglen (H)
- 1908–1910: Olaus Kjølstad (V)
- 1911–1919: Brede Kvalstad (V)
- 1920–1922: Magnus Five
- 1923–1925: Brede Kvalstad (Bp)
- 1925–1925: Iver K. Hoff (Bp)
- 1926–1934: H.B. Bragstad (H)
- 1935–1937: Peter J. Devik (Bp)
- 1938–1941: H.B. Bragstad (H)
- 1942–1945: Sigurd Kvalstad (NS)
- 1945–1945: H.B. Bragstad (H)
- 1946–1947: Trygve Rørmark (Ap)
- 1947–1947: Aksel Strøm (V)
- 1948–1951: Trygve Duun (Bp)
- 1952–1955: Peder Stene (Ap)
- 1956–1957: Leiv Skrøvstad (Bp)
- 1958–1959: Torleiv Hoff (Bp)
- 1960–1963: Rolf Aarmo (Ap)
- 1964–1971: Håkon Bjøru (V)
- 1972–1979: Per Gansmo (Sp)
- 1980–1983: Agnar Moe (Sp)
- 1984–1995: Arne B. Skomsvold (Sp)
- 1995–2007: Kristen Dille (Sp)
- 2007–2015: Bjørg Tingstad (Sp)
- 2015–2019: Trygve Sandvik (Sp)

== See also ==
- List of former municipalities of Norway
