= Omland =

Omland is a surname. Notable people with the surname include:

- Odd Omland (born 1956), Norwegian politician
- Odvar Omland (1923–2025), Norwegian politician
