= Salen Chapel =

Church in Trøndelag, Norway

- Salen kapell
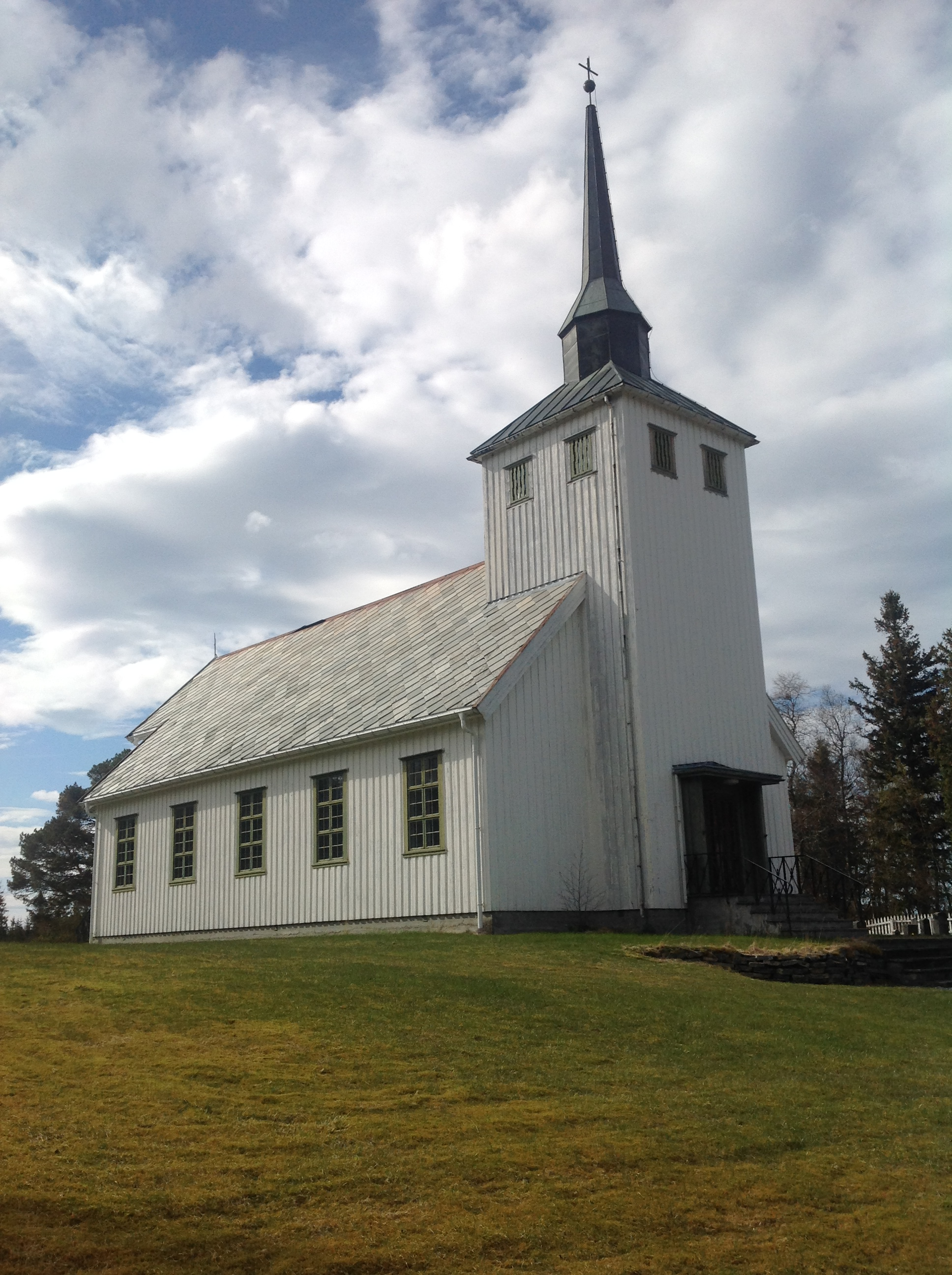
- View of the church
- Salen Chapel
- 64.69624572°N 11.45410001°E
- Location: Namsos Municipality, Trøndelag
- Country: Norway
- Denomination: Church of Norway
- Churchmanship: Evangelical Lutheran

History
- Status: Parish church
- Founded: 1900
- Consecrated: June 1953

Architecture
- Functional status: Active
- Architect: Arne Sørvig
- Architectural type: Long church
- Completed: 1953 (73 years ago)

Specifications
- Capacity: 204
- Materials: Wood

Administration
- Diocese: Nidaros bispedømme
- Deanery: Namdal prosti
- Parish: Fosnes
- Norwegian Cultural Heritage Site
- Type: Church
- Status: Not protected
- ID: 85361

Salen Chapel (Norwegian: Salen kapell) is a parish church of the Church of Norway in Namsos Municipality in Trøndelag county, Norway. It is located in the village of Salsnes, on the shores of the lake Salsvatnet. It is one of the churches for the Fosnes parish which is part of the Namdal prosti (deanery) in the Diocese of Nidaros. The white, wooden church was built in a long church style in 1953 using plans drawn up by the architect Arne Sørvig. The church seats about 204 people.

== History ==
The parish of Fosnes was served by the Fosnes Church for centuries until 1896 when it burned down. At that time, it was decided to build two new churches to replace it, but neither would be built on the site of the old church. The old Fosnes Church was rebuilt about 5 kilometres (3.1 mi) southwest of the old church site on the island of Jøa and a brand new chapel was built at Salsnes on the mainland and it was named Salen kapell. The new chapel was designed by Ole Scheistrøen and it was completed and consecrate in 1900. The chapel was destroyed during World War II and then afterwards in 1953, the present church was built on the same site. It was consecrated in June 1953.

== See also ==
- List of churches in Nidaros
