= Goksøyr =

Goksøyr is a surname. Notable people with the surname include:

- Arnulf Goksøyr (born 1963), Norwegian politician
- Hans Goksøyr (1923–2016), Norwegian businessman
- Marte Wexelsen Goksøyr (born 1982), Norwegian actress, public speaker, writer, and public debater
