= Dun, Norway =

Village in Namsos Municipality, Norway

Dun
- Village
- Interactive map of Dun
- Location within Trøndelag Location within Norway
- Coordinates: 64.6571°N 11.2646°E
- Country: Norway
- Region: Central Norway
- County: Trøndelag
- District: Namdalen
- Municipality: Namsos Municipality
- Elevation: 38 m (125 ft)
- Time zone: UTC+01:00 (CET)
  - Summer (DST): UTC+02:00 (CEST)
- Post Code: 7856 Jøa

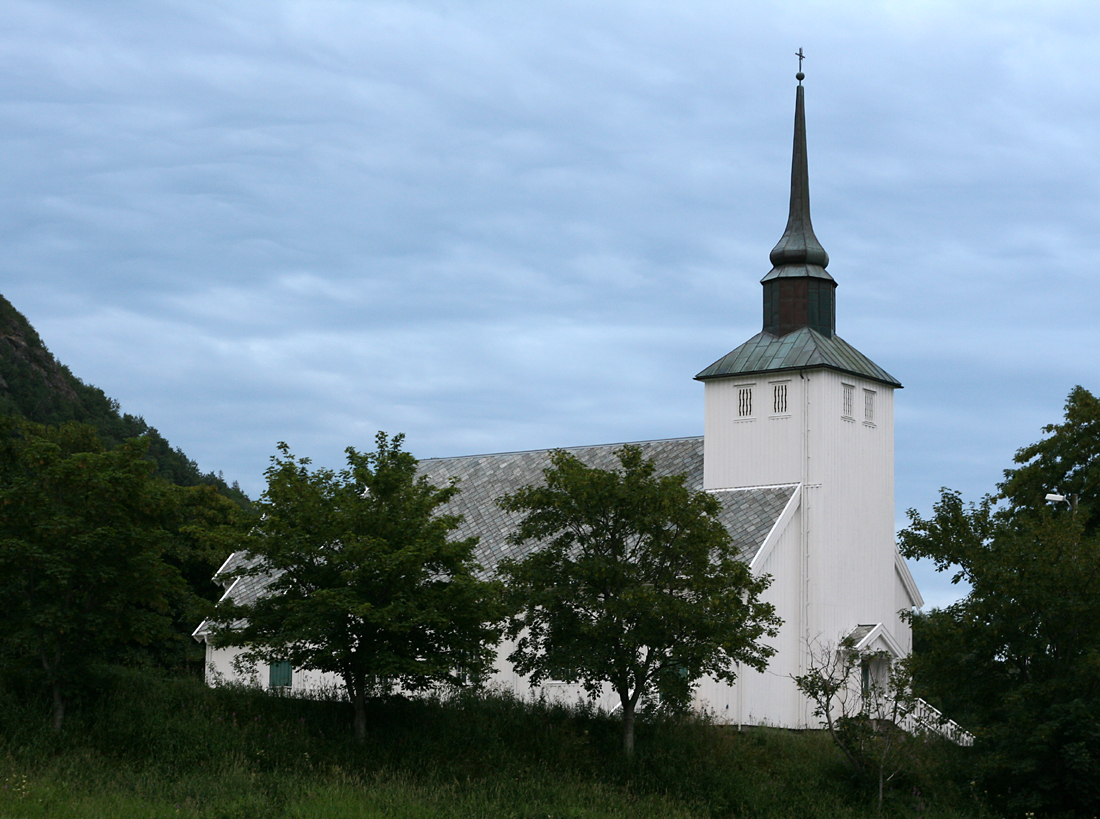
Dun church, Fosnes, Nord-Trøndelag, Norway.

Dun is a village in Namsos Municipality in Trøndelag county, Norway. It is located in the central part of the island of Jøa, and it is the location of Dun Church. Olav Duun was from this village.

The village was the administrative centre of the old Fosnes Municipality until 2020 when the municipality was merged into Namsos.
