= Pentti Saarikoski =

Finnish poet (1937–1983)

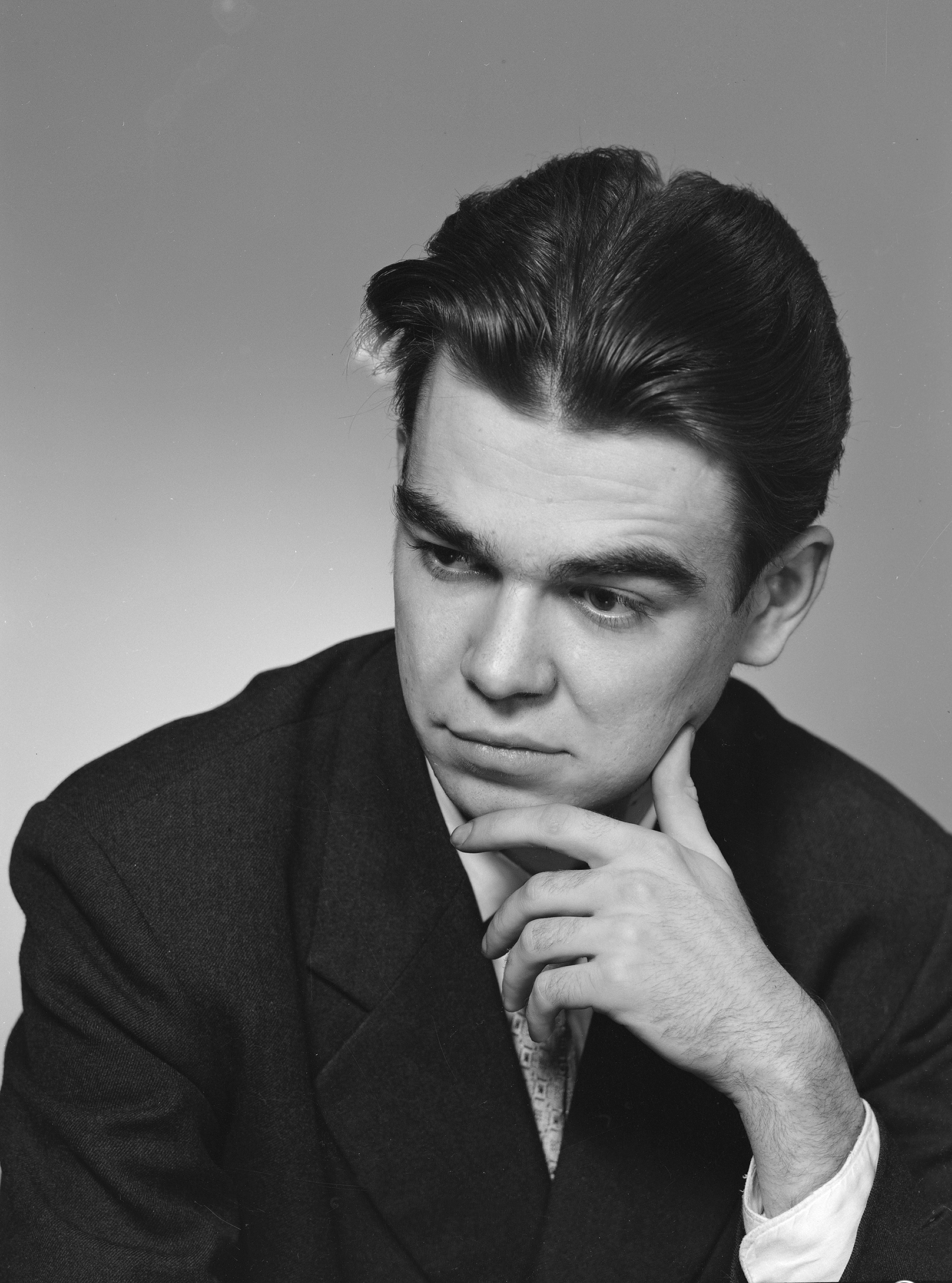
Saarikoski in 1958

Pentti Saarikoski (Impilahti, now in the Republic of Karelia September 2, 1937 – Joensuu August 24, 1983) was a Finnish poet. He is considered one of the most important poets in the literary scene of Finland during the 1960s and 1970s. His body of work comprises poetry and translations, among them such classics as Homer's Odyssey and James Joyce's Ulysses.

According to Saarikoski, he was the only person in the world who had ever translated both Homer's and Joyce's Ulysses – a statement that probably holds true even today. Moreover, it only took two years for him to translate Homer's Odyssey from Victor Bérard's edition, which is thought to be a rather fast accomplishment. Other notable translations include Poetics by Aristotle and Catcher in the Rye by J. D. Salinger.

Saarikoski is buried in Heinävesi in the cemetery of the New Valamo monastery.

== Early life ==
During World War II, Saarikoski was sent to Sweden as one of the Finnish war children. He learned to write and read Swedish in Norrköping in 1944.

== His work ==
Saarikoski's breakthrough was both critically and commercially Mitä tapahtuu todella? (What is actually going on?) published in 1962. The collection of poems heralded a new era in Finnish culture, laying the foundation of Finnish "participative poetry", a style whose adherents insisted that poets should participate in politics through their work. Indeed, some of the poems featured in the collection do have a clear political tone, whereas in the 1950s Finnish modernists were generally more inclined to think that art should be done solely for art's sake. Mitä tapahtuu todella? marked also a change in the poet's style. His early works Runoja (Poems) and Toisia Runoja (Other Poems), both published in 1958, are not yet "participative poetry" or "democratic poetry" as the poet himself called his style. Instead, they are distinguished by their references to Greek antiquity while the general style was modern, which has led literary critics to say that Saarikoski's first works form his "Greek period". Saarikoski's interest in Greek began very early on. In fact, he studied Greek and literature at the University of Helsinki in the 1950s, though he never received a degree.

During the 1970s, Saarikoski continued to publish poem collections. His admiration for the Greek philosopher Heraclitus deepened to such lengths that at one point Saarikoski adopted the philosopher's colloquial name "The Obscure", "Hämärä" in Finnish, to his poetry. Saarikoski began to obscure his poems intentionally and titled one of his collections Hämärän Tanssit (The Dark One's Dances, translated by Anselm Hollo), which is a reference to Heraclitus. While some of his works especially from the late 1960s had received rather morose reception from critics, his last three poem collections which form "Tiarnia-trilogy" (1977, 1980, 1983) are often seen as the second artistic peak point of his career. They were written in Sweden where Saarikoski lived with his last wife Mia Berner. These works reflect pessimism towards technocratic society which is seen as deterring the social participation of citizens. All the works include a word "dance" in their title which refers to a form of social resistance.

Saarikoski also wrote columns by the pen-name "Nenä" ("Nose"). His columns satirized the church, the army, politics and, all in all, conservatism. In his columns, he parodied the official political jargon of his times in a very effective manner. He served as the editor-in-chief of a Communist Party affiliated cultural magazine, Aikalainen, between 1963 and 1967.

== Politics ==
Saarikoski stood as a candidate for the Finnish People's Democratic League (SKDL) in the parliamentary elections of 1966 and 1970, but was not elected. He became a member of the Communist Party of Finland in 1968.

== Celebrity ==
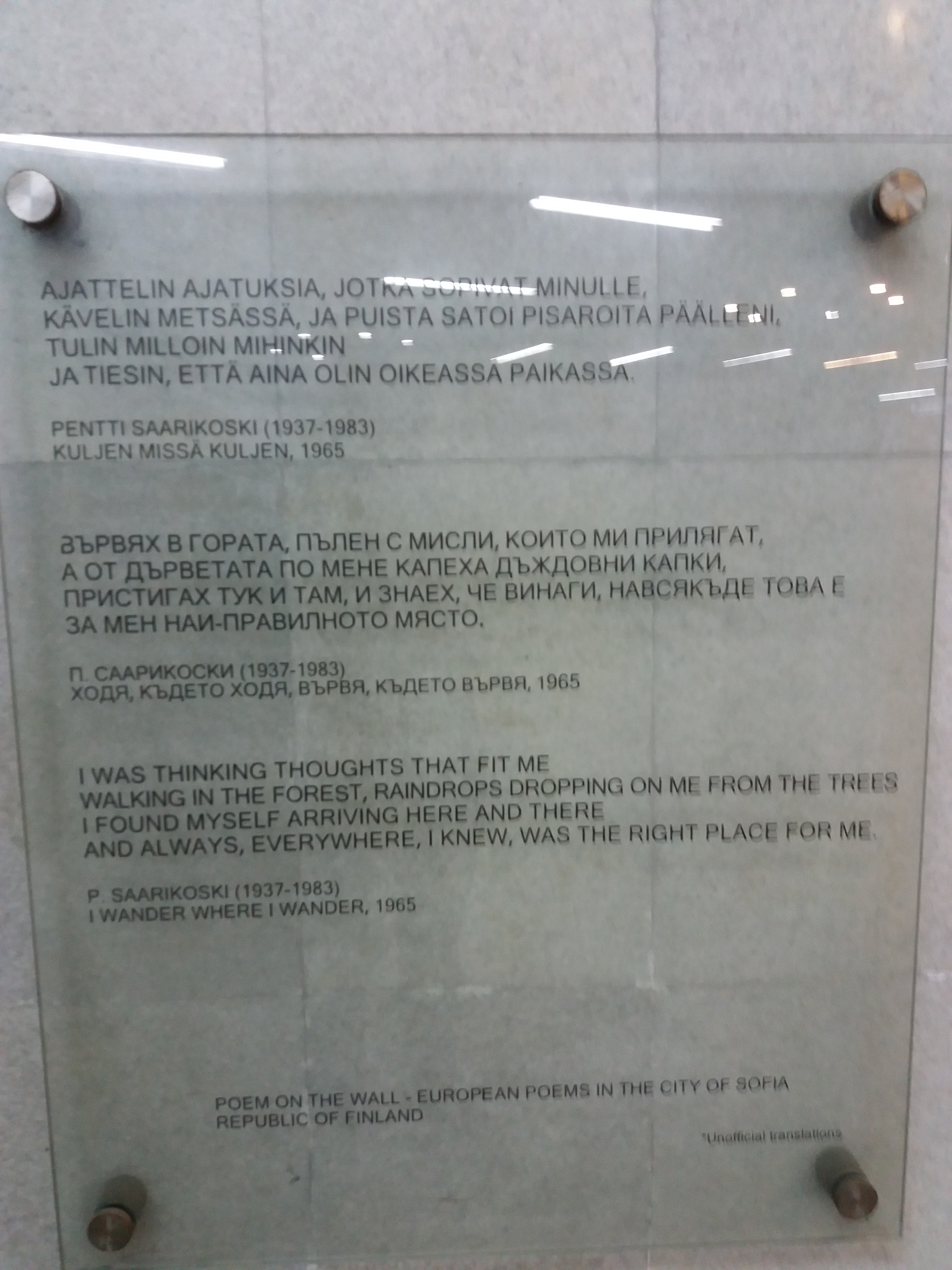
A poem by Saarikoski in Sofia downtown, Bulgaria.

Saarikoski was a well-known celebrity in Finland due to his controversial personal life. He was an enthusiastic communist, was married four times and consumed alcohol heavily. Saarikoski himself said: "I make my life fiction so that it would be true". In an interview, Saarikoski's daughter, Helena Saarikoski, stated that her father was a prime example of a European bohemian, and as such helped to establish an image of a modern intellect in Finland.

== Musical settings ==
Finnish composer Kaija Saariaho set five poems from the collection Alue (The District, 1973) under the title Saarikoski-laulut (Saarikoski Songs). The cycle, that deals with the destruction of nature, exists in versions for soprano and piano (2017) and for soprano and orchestra (2020), the latter of which was premiered by the Boston Symphony Orchestra.

== Translated works ==
- Helsinki: selected poems of Pentti Saarikoski; translated from Finnish by Anselm Hollo (London: Rapp & Carroll, 1967)
- Poems: 1958-1980; translated from Finnish by Anselm Hollo (West Branch, Iowa: Toothpaste Press, 1983)
- Trilogy (The dance floor on the mountain, Invitation to the dance, The dark one's dances); translated from Finnish by Anselm Hollo (Albuquerque: La Alamada Press, 2003)
- The edge of Europe a kinetic image by Pentti Saarikoski; translated from Finnish by Anselm Hollo (University of Notre Dame, Indiana: Action Books, 2007)
