= Arnadal Church =

Church in Vestfold, Norway

- Arnadal kirke
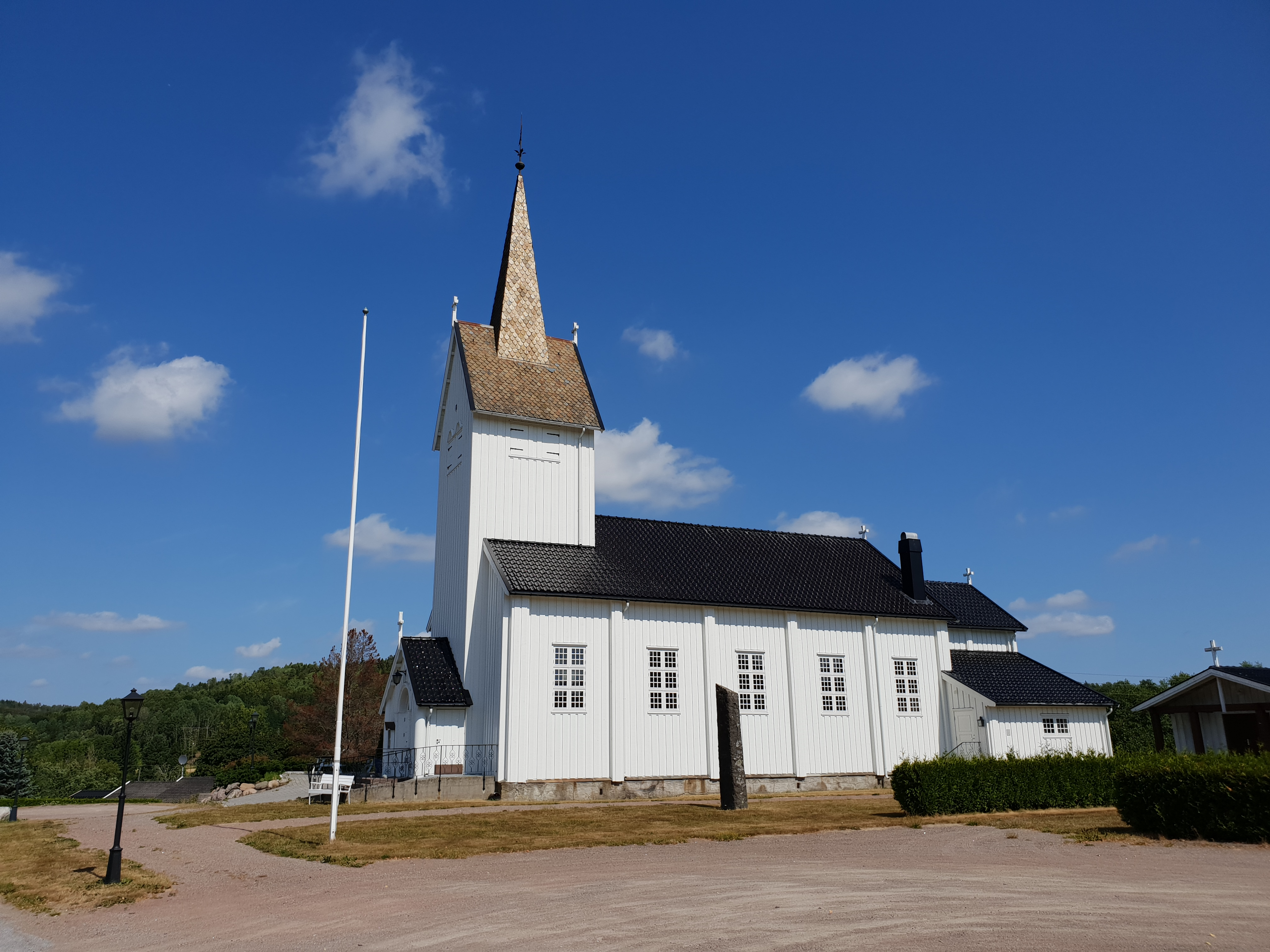
- View of the church
- Arnadal Church
- 59°17′24″N 10°15′03″E
- Location: Sandefjord Municipality, Vestfold
- Country: Norway
- Denomination: Church of Norway
- Previous denomination: Catholic Church
- Churchmanship: Evangelical Lutheran

History
- Former name: Arendal kirke
- Status: Parish church
- Founded: 13th century
- Consecrated: 1882

Architecture
- Functional status: Active
- Architect: Henrik Nissen
- Architectural type: Long church
- Completed: 1882 (144 years ago)

Specifications
- Capacity: 185
- Materials: Wood

Administration
- Diocese: Tunsberg
- Deanery: Sandefjord prosti
- Parish: Arnadal
- Norwegian Cultural Heritage Site
- Type: Church
- Status: Not protected
- ID: 83792

Arnadal Church (Norwegian: Arnadal kirke) is a parish church of the Church of Norway in Sandefjord Municipality in Vestfold county, Norway. It is located in the village of Fossnes. It is the church for the Arnadal parish which is part of the Sandefjord prosti (deanery) in the Diocese of Tunsberg. The white, wooden church was built in a long church design in 1882 using plans drawn up by the architect Henrik Nissen. The church seats about 185 people.

== History ==
The earliest existing historical records of the church date back to the year 1398, but the church was not built that year. The original church was likely built in the 13th century, on a site about 50 metres (160 ft) west of the present church building. Not much is known about the old church. In 1620–1622, the old church was deemed to be in poor condition so plans were made for a new church. The old church was torn down and a new church was rebuilt on the same site, being completed in 1623.

By the late 1800s, the old church was in poor condition and in need of replacement. A new building was constructed in 1881–1882 on a site about 50 metres (160 ft) to the east. After the new building was completed, the old church was torn down. The church was designed by the architect Henrik Nissen. It was consecrated by the bishop on 26 April 1882. It is a timber-framed wooden long church. The church has a bell tower on the west end of the nave which is drawn somewhat into the body of the building, and a straight-ended choir that is surrounded by vestries (which were extended in 1979 and 1981). An addition was built to the north of the nave which includes several other rooms. The church was extensively restored in the 1950s according to plans by Einar Rivå and rededicated in the autumn of 1956. Historically, the church name was sometimes spelled "Arendal Church" until 1952 when it formally changed its name to "Arnadal" to avoid confusion with the churches in the nearby town of Arendal in the nearby Aust-Agder county.

== Media gallery ==
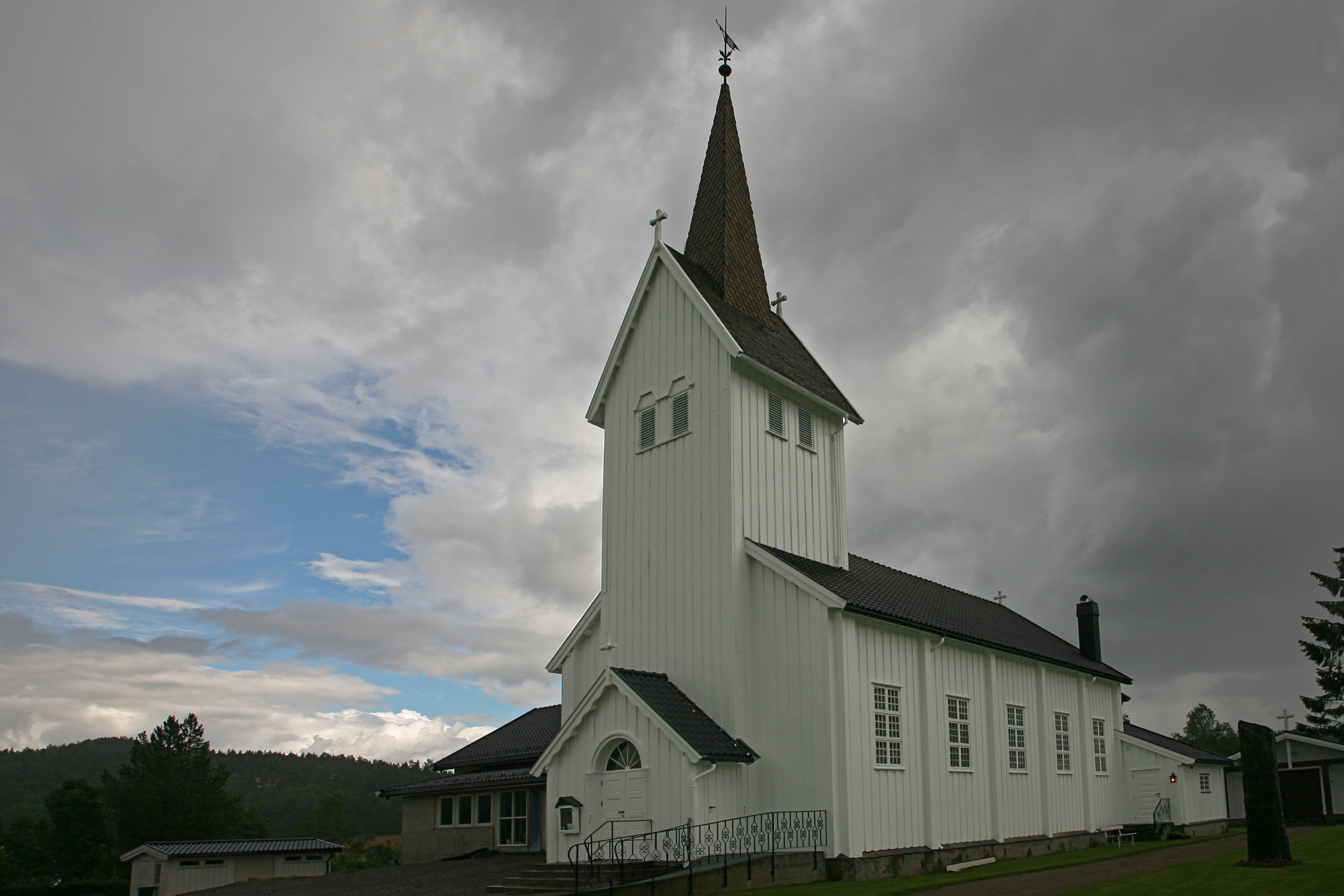

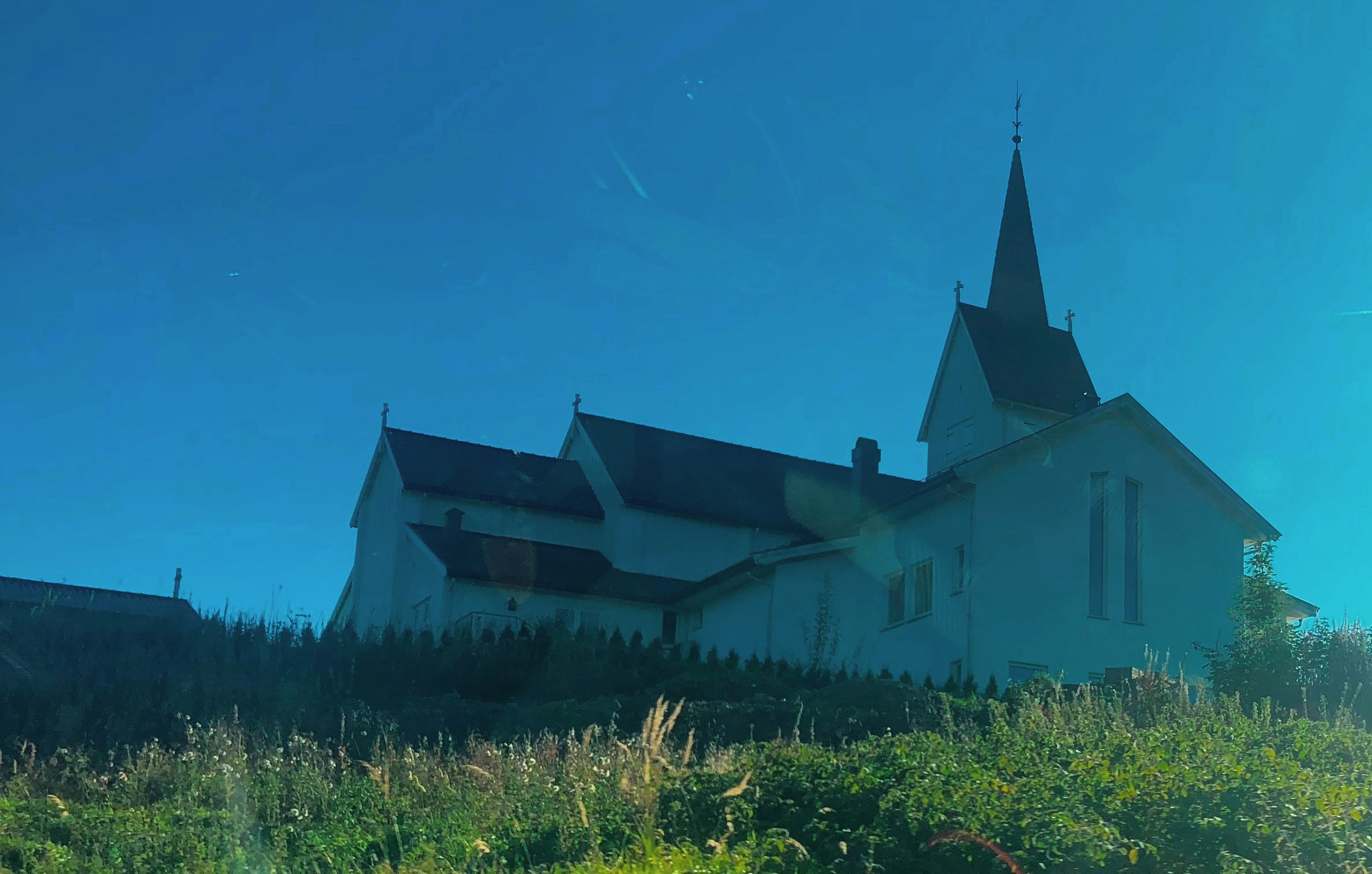

== See also ==
- List of churches in Tunsberg
