= Gunnar Berg (politician) =

Norwegian politician

Gunnar Berg (13 September 1923 – 23 December 2007) was a Norwegian politician for the Liberal Party.

He served as a deputy representative to the Norwegian Parliament from Nordland during the term 1965–1969.
