= Egil Oddvar Larsen =

Norwegian politician

Egil Oddvar Larsen (23 September 1923 – 17 October 2009) was a Norwegian politician for the Labour Party.

From 1975 to 1991, Larsen was the mayor of Hamar. As such he played a role in the 1994 Winter Olympics. He had been a member of Hamar county council since 1959, and became deputy mayor in 1968.

He served as a deputy representative to the Norwegian Parliament from Hedmark during the term 1969–1973.
