= Eystein Bærug =

Norwegian politician

Eystein Bærug (29 March 1923 – 1 September 1998) was a Norwegian politician for the Liberal Party.

He served as a deputy representative to the Parliament of Norway from Vestfold during the term 1973–1977. In total he met during 7 days of parliamentary session. He was also mayor of Brunlanes Municipality.
