= Babbis Friis-Baastad =

Norwegian children's writer

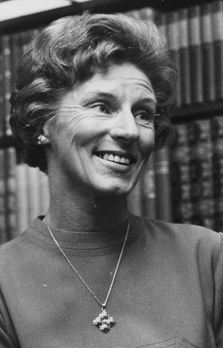
- Friis-Baastad
- Born: Ellinor Margrethe Blauenfeldt; 27 August 1921; Bergen, Norway
- Died: 10 January 1970 (aged 48); Oslo
- Occupation: children's writer

Babbis Friis-Baastad (née Blauenfeldt; 27 August 1921 – 10 January 1970) was a Norwegian children's writer.

== Personal life ==
Friis-Baastad was born in Bergen on 27 August 1921, to Carl Heinrich Blauenfeldt and Edel Johanne Mønness, and grew up in Oslo as an only child. She passed examen artium in 1940, and subsequently commercial school, and then started studying philology. Her studies were eventually aborted due to marriage, child birth and fleeing to Sweden from the German occupation of Norway. She married pilot Kaare Friis-Baastad in 1942, and they had a total of four children.

== Career ==
From 1953 on Friis-Baastad contributed to the children's radio shows Lørdagsbarnetimen and Barnetimen for de minste, writing sketches and audio plays. Her best known of these works is the series Tulutta og Makronelle, which saw several reprises and was published in book format in 1960.

Her first children's book was Æresord from 1959, which was also translated into English, Dutch and Swedish.

Further books are Kjersti (1962), Ikke ta Bamse (1964), Du må våkne, Tor! (1967), Hest på ønskelisten (1968), which was translated and published in the US in 1972 (with the English title Wanted! A horse!), and Hest i sentrum (1969).

Ikke ta Bamse, translated 1967 into English as Don't take Teddy, is about an intellectually disabled boy, viewed from the perspective of his younger brother Mikkel. In 1969 the publisher Charles Scribner's Sons received the Mildred L. Batchelder Award for the translation of Don't take Teddy, thereby labeled the year's "most outstanding" children's book translated into English language and published in the US. The book received the Lewis Carroll Shelf Award in 1976.

== Awards and legacy ==
Three of Friis-Baastad's books were awarded the Dammprisen from the publishing house Damm, and she received several prizes from the Ministry of Culture for her children's books.
