= Aud Alvær =

Norwegian politician (1921–2000)

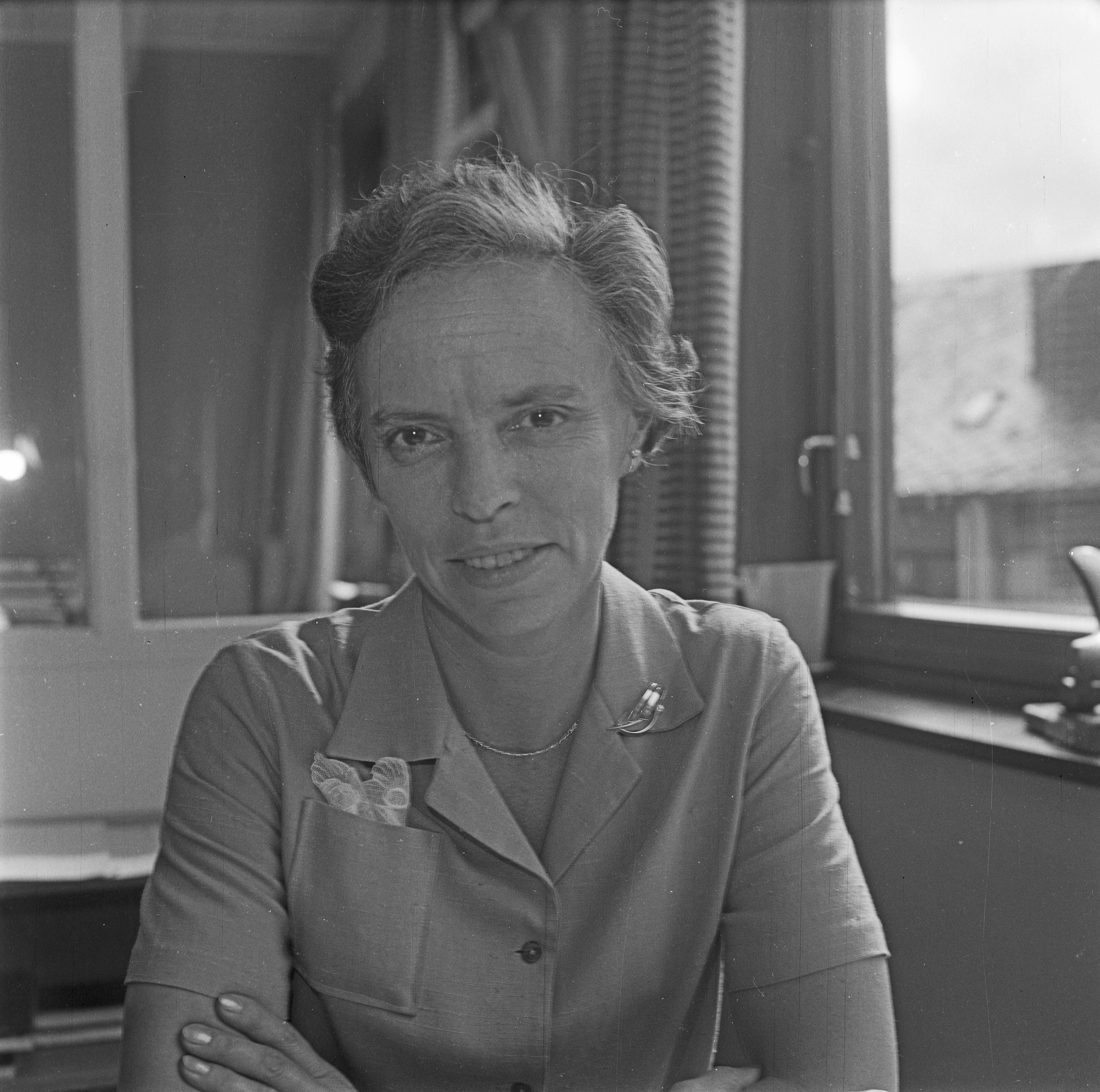

Aud Alvær (27 November 1921 – 11 June 2000) was a Norwegian politician for the Liberal Party.

She served as a deputy representative to the Norwegian Parliament from Bergen during the term 1969–1973.
