= Dun Church =

Church in Trøndelag, Norway

- Dun kirke
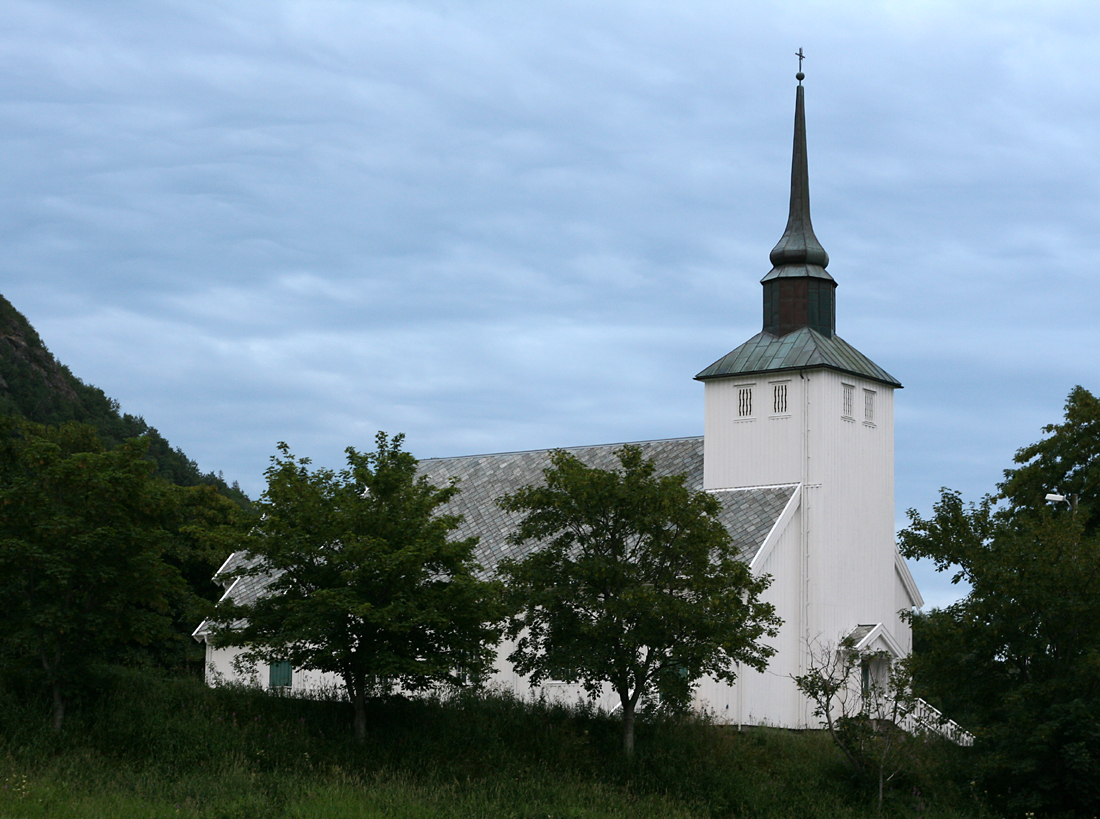
- View of the church
- Dun Church
- 64.65705655°N 11.26189130°E
- Location: Namsos Municipality, Trøndelag
- Country: Norway
- Denomination: Church of Norway
- Churchmanship: Evangelical Lutheran

History
- Status: Parish church
- Founded: 13th century
- Consecrated: 24 July 1949

Architecture
- Functional status: Active
- Architect: Arne Sørvig
- Architectural type: Long church
- Completed: 1949 (77 years ago)

Specifications
- Capacity: 400
- Materials: Wood

Administration
- Diocese: Nidaros bispedømme
- Deanery: Namdal prosti
- Parish: Fosnes
- Norwegian Cultural Heritage Site
- Type: Church
- Status: Not protected
- ID: 84039

Dun Church (Norwegian: Dun kirke) is a parish church of the Church of Norway in Namsos Municipality in Trøndelag county, Norway. It is located in the village of Dun in the central part of the island of Jøa. It is the main church for the Fosnes parish which is part of the Namdal prosti (deanery) in the Diocese of Nidaros. The white, wooden church was built in a long church style in 1949 using plans drawn up by the architect Arne Sørvig. The church seats about 400 people.

== History ==
The earliest existing historical records of the church date back to the year 1533, but the old church was likely built around the year 1250. Originally, the church served the whole Fosnes prestegjeld which included most of today's Namsos Municipality and Flatanger Municipality. The first church was located at Fosnes (along the Fosnavågen bay), about 5 kilometres (3.1 mi) to the northeast of today's church site. Around the year 1560, the old church burned down and replaced with a new church on the same site in 1566. Not much is known about that church, but it was described in 1750 as a wooden building that was painted red with a slate roof. In 1770, the old church burned down and was replaced with a new church on the same site. In 1871, the church was struck by lightning and it burned to the ground. Planning for a new church began soon afterwards. A new building was designed by Jacob Wilhelm Nordan and completed in 1872. It was a timber-framed long church. Not long after, the church was again struck by lightning in 1896 when it burned down again.

Planning for a new church began soon after once again, but this time there was much debate about where the church should be rebuilt. A royal resolution from 24 September 1898 ordered that the new parish church should be built in the village of Dun, in the middle of the island of Jøa about 5 kilometres (3.1 mi) to the southwest of the old church site since that was more centrally located for the population of the island and less likely to be damaged by storms and lightning as it was further inland. So, a new timber-framed long church was designed by Ole Scheistrøen and it was built in village of Dun. The new church was consecrated in 1900. In 1926, a small Fosnes Chapel was constructed on the historic church site where the cemetery remained. The new church in Dun lasted just over 40 years when on 10 July 1944 a lightning strike hit the church and it burned down. The present church was built a few years later in 1949 to replace it. That building was consecrated on 24 July 1949 by the Bishop Arne Fjellbu.

== See also ==
- List of churches in Nidaros
