= Andreas Bernhard Gamst =

Norwegian politician

Andreas Bernhard Gamst (30 August 1923 – 8 January 2015) was a Norwegian politician for the Liberal Party.

He served as a deputy representative to the Norwegian Parliament from Troms during the term 1969–1973.

Gamst died in January 2015 at the age of 91.
