= Frank Weylert =

Norwegian singer and actor

- Born: 27 June 1921; Kristiania, Norway
- Died: 25 December 2007 (aged 86)
- Occupations: Singer and actor

Frank Weylert (né Johansen; 27 June 1921 – 25 December 2007) was a Norwegian singer and actor.

== Personal life ==
Weylert was born in Kristiania on 27 June 1921, a son of Oskar Emanuel Johansen and Olga Elisabeth Ericsson. He married Olga Alfhild Tobiassen in 1958.

== Career ==
Weylert made his stage debut at Edderkoppen Theatre in 1946. From 1950 to 1961 he worked for Lewis & Young Productions in Los Angeles. He played at the National Swedish Touring Theatre from 1963 to 1968. From 1968 he was assigned at Rogaland Teater in Stavanger, where he played about 80 different characters until his resignment in 1991.
