= Harald Sverre Olsen =

Norwegian politician (1921–2020)

Harald Sverre Olsen (15 June 1921 – 17 September 2020) was a Norwegian politician for the Labour Party.

Olsen served as a deputy representative to the Norwegian Parliament for Troms from 1969 to 1983.

He died in September 2020 at the age of 99.
