= Rolf Gjermundsen =

Norwegian politician

Rolf Gjermundsen (5 June 1921 - 12 December 1994) was a Norwegian politician for the Labour Party.

He served as a deputy representative to the Norwegian Parliament from Østfold during the terms 1969–1973 and 1973–1977.
