= Frode Nilsen =

Norwegian diplomat (1923–2016)

- Born: December 12, 1923 (age 102); Arendal
- Died: June 29, 2016 (aged 92)
- Occupations: Norwegian counsellor Norwegian ambassador

Frode E. T. Nilsen (12 December 1923 – 29 June 2016) was a Norwegian diplomat and ambassador.

He was born in Arendal, but grew up in Dypvåg Municipality and Tinn Municipality. During World War II he served in Milorg. After the war he majored in political science in 1951, followed by a trainee period in the Ministry of Foreign Affairs as well as the Norwegian National Defence College.

He was a counsellor at the Norwegian embassy in Washington, DC from 1965 to 1972, and was later dispatched to Chile. He was the Norwegian ambassador in Chile from 1975 to 1982, ambassador to the Caribbean from 1982 to 1987, in Venezuela from 1987 to 1988 and again in Chile from 1988 to 1992. He retired in 1992. He died on 29 June 2016 at the age of 92.

== 1973 Chilean coup d'état ==
Bergens Tidende has said that Norway sent him to Chile "on a special mission. He was to open the embassy for persecuted asylum seekers—and reestablish Norway's honour". (Norway's then honorary general consul had made controversial statements in support of Pinochet's government, and then ambassador had made a controversial statement about the coup d'état.).

Norway sent him to Chile "right after the coup d'état, and he quickly had space cleared for 30 political refugees on the embassy's second floor".
