= Helge Røstad =

Norwegian judge

Helge Røstad (29 December 1923 – 23 October 1994) was a Norwegian judge.

He was born in Kristiansand. He worked in the Norwegian Prosecuting Authority from 1968, as deputy under-secretary of State in the Ministry of Justice and the Police from 1970, and as a Supreme Court Justice from 1976 to 1993. In 1985 he received an honorary doctorate from the Faculty of Law at Uppsala University, Sweden.
