= Salsnes =

Village in Namsos Municipality, Norway

- Village
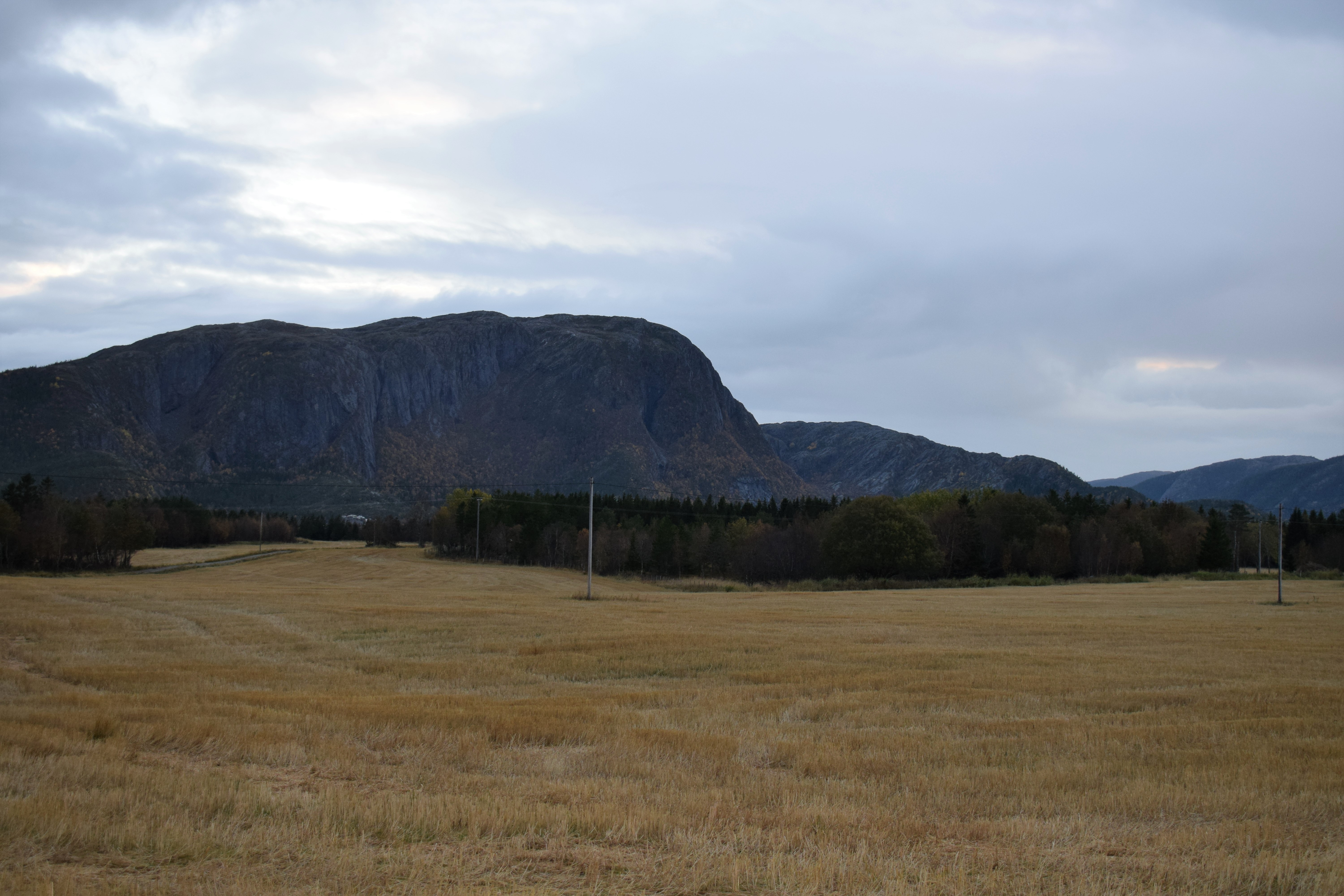
- View of the village
- Interactive map of Salsnes
- Location within Trøndelag Location within Norway
- Coordinates: 64.6878°N 11.4346°E
- Country: Norway
- Region: Central Norway
- County: Trøndelag
- District: Namdalen
- Municipality: Namsos Municipality
- Elevation: 4 m (13 ft)
- Time zone: UTC+01:00 (CET)
  - Summer (DST): UTC+02:00 (CEST)
- Post Code: 7817 Salsnes

Salsnes is a village in Namsos Municipality in Trøndelag county, Norway. It is located on the mainland on a small isthmus of land between the Foldafjord and the lake Salsvatnet. Salen Chapel is located in the village. Salsnes is one of the locations in the video game Treasure Hunter Simulator.
