= Fossnes =

Village in Sandefjord Municipality, Norway

Fossnes Valberg
- Village
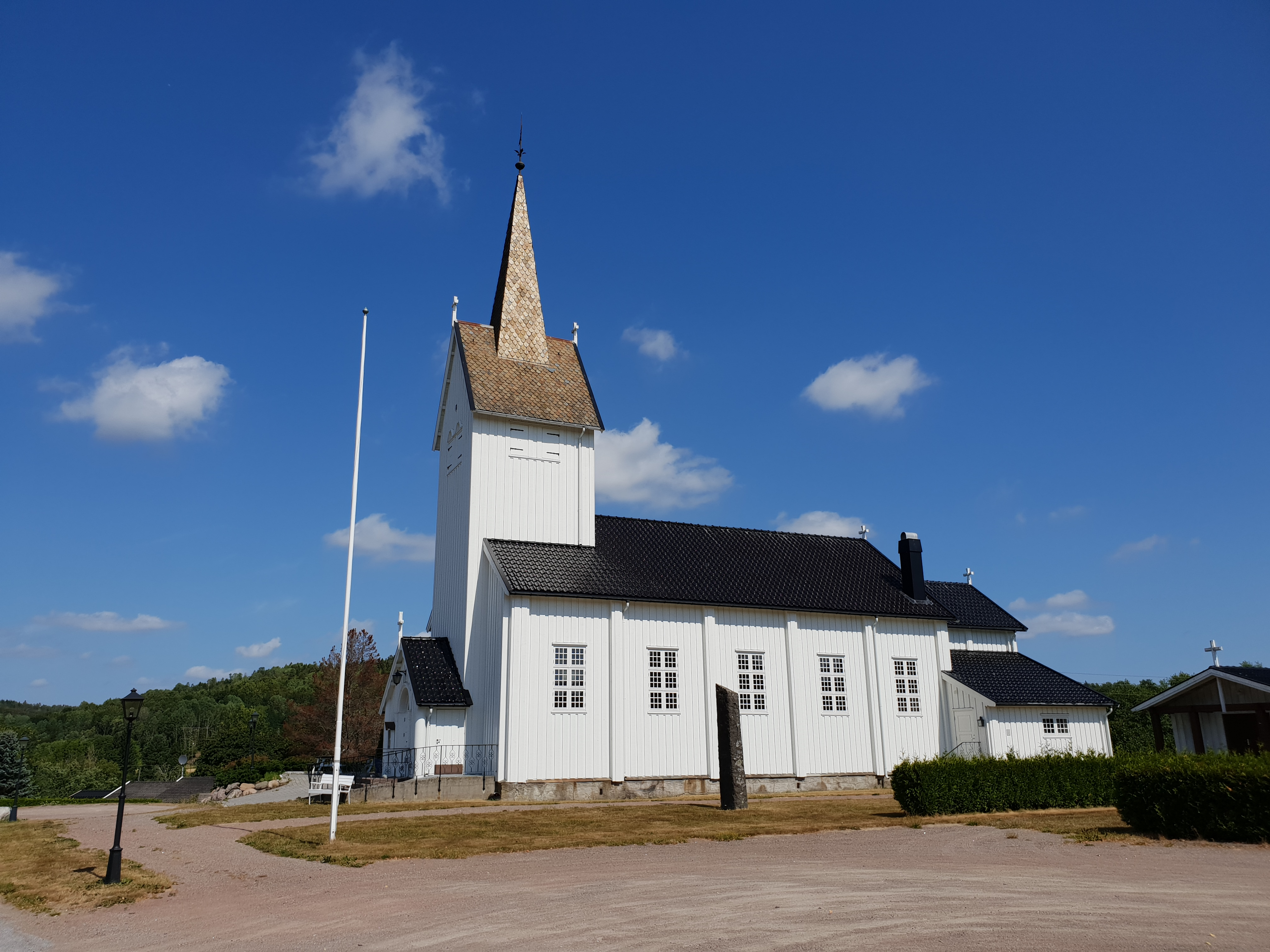
- View of the village church
- Interactive map of Fossnes
- Coordinates: 59.28018°N 10.25866°E
- Country: Norway
- Region: Eastern Norway
- County: Vestfold
- Municipality: Sandefjord Municipality

Area
  - Total: 0.36 km^{2} (0.14 sq mi)
- Elevation: 54 m (177 ft)

Population (2026)
  - Total: 701
  - Density: 1,947/km^{2} (5,040/sq mi)
- Time zone: UTC+01:00 (CET)
  - Summer (DST): UTC+02:00 (CEST)
- Post Code: 3160 Stokke

Fossnes or Valberg is a village in Sandefjord Municipality in Vestfold county, Norway. The village is located about 8 kilometres (5.0 mi) to the north of the village of Stokke and about 5 kilometres (3.1 mi) to the southeast of the village of Andebu. The city of Tønsberg lies about 10 kilometres (6.2 mi) to the east.

The 0.36-square-kilometre (89-acre) village has a population (2026) of 701 and a population density of 1,947 inhabitants per square kilometre (5,040/sq mi).

Arnadal Church is located on the north side of the village, along the river Merkadamselva.
