= Fredrik Jensen (Waffen-SS member) =

Norwegian SS member (1921–2011)

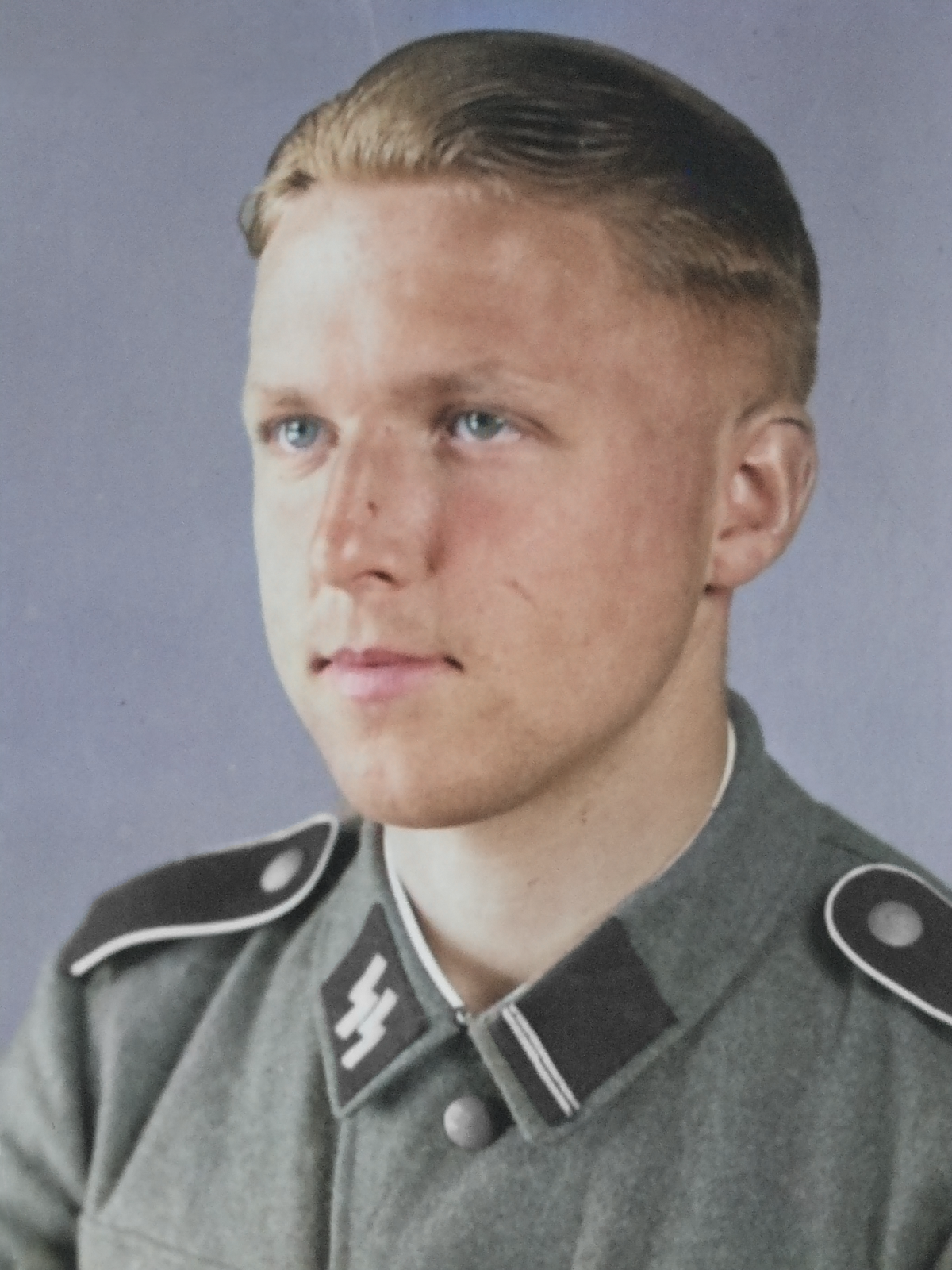
Fredrik Jensen

Fredrik Jensen (25 March 1921 – 31 July 2011) was a Norwegian member of the German Waffen SS during World War II.

Born in Oslo, Norway, Jensen was the most highly decorated Norwegian on the Axis' side during World War II, being awarded the German Cross in Gold on 7 December 1944. He served in several Waffen-SS regiments, such as the SS-Panzergrenadier Regiment 4 Der Führer in 2nd SS Panzer Division Das Reich and SS-Panzergrenadier-Regiment 9 Germania in 5th SS Panzer Division Wiking. He served on the southern front for the end of the war, with the rank of Obersturmführer and was arrested in hospital in Vienna. He was kept in the American prison in Dachau.

Jensen was sentenced to three months in jail under the legal purge in Norway after World War II, and was also sentenced to a loss of citizen's rights for ten years. After having served his prison sentence, he settled down in Sweden as a foreman and had great success in fabrication machinery. He later lived in Málaga in Spain. In 1994, Jensen was on a business trip in the United States. After his name appeared on a list of suspected war criminals, he was arrested and deported.

In June 2007, the Spanish press publicized possible contacts between Jensen and the war criminal Aribert Heim. Jensen denied the accusation.
