= Arne Asper =

Norwegian businessman (1923–2017)

- Born: 12 March 1923; Nes, Norway
- Died: 25 January 2017 (aged 93)
- Occupation: Businessperson
- Awards: Order of St. Olav

Arne Johannes Asper (12 March 1923 – 25 January 2017) was a Norwegian businessperson.

Asper was born in Nes, Akershus to farmers Johan Pedersen Asper and Alma Evensen. He was assigned with the company Frionor from 1947, as CEO from 1967 to 1986, and as chairman of the board from 1986 to 1988. Frionor developed to be among the world leading companies in the frozen fish industry. After various transactions the brand name and major production facilities were eventually acquired by Findus.

Asper was decorated Knight, First Class of the Order of St. Olav in 1987. He died in 2017.
