= Mia Berner =

Norwegian sociologist and writer

- Born: 13 June 1923
- Died: 9 December 2009 (aged 86)
- Occupations: Philosopher; University lecturer Radio journalist Writer

Mia Berner (13 June 1923 – 9 December 2009) was a Norwegian philosopher, sociologist, university lecturer, radio journalist, essayist, novelist, poet and non-fiction writer.

Berner grew up in Stavanger, and started studying philosophy at the University of Oslo. During the German occupation of Norway she was involved in resistance work, and had to flee to Sweden in 1943. She was married to the Swedish journalist Sven Öste, and the couple settled on the island of Tjörn, near Gothenburg. In 1975 she married the Finnish poet Pentti Saarikoski. Among her works is the memoir book PS. Anteckningar från et sorgeår from 1985, the novels Galjonsfigurer (1987), Makrillgarn (1988) and Österut (1990), and Fordi det er slik jeg ror from 2005.
