= The People of Juvik =

Series of novels by Olav Duun

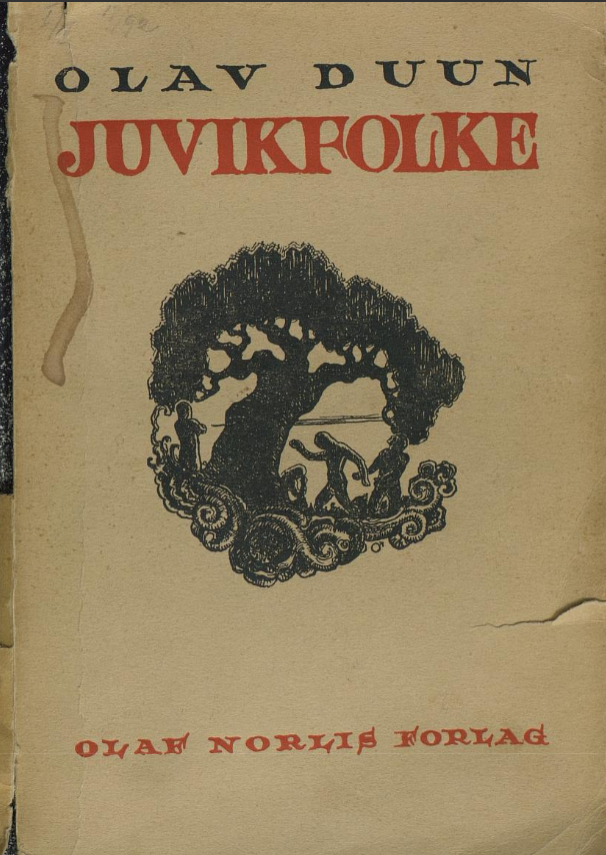
1927 norwegian edition of Juvikfolke. Cover art by Albert Jørn

The People of Juvik is a series of six historical novels by Norwegian author Olav Duun. The books chronicle the lives of the Juvikings, an old Norwegian landowning peasant family living on Islands off the coast of Namdalen, Trøndelag. The series covers six or seven generations of Juvikings, starting with Per Anders Juvik, the last of the old style Juvikings, and ending with Per and Anders, the sons of Odin Setran, Per Anders' great-great-great grandfather. The first novel, The Trough of the Wave (Juvikingar in Norwegian), starts out at Juvika, a fictional farm in the Namdal, but moves to Haaberg when Per Anders' son Per leaves his ancestral lands and buys his sister's late husband's farm. The first three books follow the Juvikings from the 18th century to the late 19th; the final three follow the childhood, life and eventually death of Odin.

The six novels were originally published in Norway between 1918 and 1923. They were later translated by Arthur G. Chater into English, and published by Alfred Knopf in America between 1930 and 1935.

== Style ==
Duun was known as one of the outstanding writers of 20th-century Norwegian fiction. He stands as a remarkable synthesis of the Norwegian folk spirit and the European cultural form. Duun wrote in Landsmål, an amalgam of peasant dialects that developed into Nynorsk, one of the official languages of Norway. Many of his books incorporate the dialects of his subjects: peasants, fishermen and farmers. His novels analyze the psychological and spiritual characteristics of rural, peasant life. The dialogue of Duun's characters is often very light and earthy, and often a single paragraph will contain the speech of multiple characters, separated by a dash. In contrast, Duun's descriptions of nature and of landscapes are lyrical and beautiful, often including personifications of places or natural forces.

== Influence ==
Olav Duun is thought to be one of the most important writers of the 20th century. Among those influenced by his work was Nobel Prize winning author Sigrid Undset, who considered Duun to be Norway's greatest writer.

== The Series ==
=== The Trough of the Wave ===
The Trough of the Wave (Juvikingar), originally published in Norway in 1918, was translated and published in America in 1930. The story opens in the first years of the nineteenth century with Per Anders, the last of the old-timers, one who fears neither man nor devil and laughs at the superstitions of his womenfolk. He is disappointed in his sons; Jens, the elder, has all the ruthlessness of his race, but none of their steadying qualities. Per is steady enough, but weak and troubled with an uneasy conscience. He and his brother have chased a thief into the sea, and the thought of this ugly deed pursues Per as long as he lives. On the death of the old man the family breaks up. Per moves to the other side of the fjord, where he buys the farm of Haaberg from a widowed sister. As Jens prefers the roving life the old farm of Juvik goes to a younger sister, who has married beneath her. Henceforward the home of the Juvikings is Haaberg. Per dies before he has got the farm into shape, leaving two sons, Anders and Petter.

=== The Blind Man ===
The Blind Man (I blinda), published in Norway in 1919 and in America in 1931, deals with Anders. In each generation there is a capable man and a ne’er-do-well. Anders has many of the Juvikings’ best qualities, together with a strong dose of obstinacy. Petter is a spiteful sneak, with just too little backbone to be a thoroughly bad man. He tries his elder brother sorely, and Anders is very patient with him. Anders is in love with Massi Liness, but when she marries his friend Ola Engdal, he takes as his wife, Solvi, a girl of Lapp blood and a former sweetheart of Petter. To marry a Lapp is a disgrace in itself, but worse than this is to come. Misfortunes fall on Engdal and on others in the parish, while Haaberg is suspiciously lucky. The neighbors put this down to Lapp sorcery, and Anders has sufficient belief in this to turn Solvi out of his house and pack her and their child off to her father’s cabin. Petter starts a rock-slide which falls on Solvi’s boat, drowning her and the child. Anders does not know how to take this: he wished the rocks to fall and has a certain sense of guilt. But he succeeds in putting it out of his mind; the farm prospers; after Engdal’s early death Anders marries Massi and they have a large family. In middle age Anders’s sight begins to fail; he tries a remedy of his own — hot tar — and becomes totally blind. Per, the hope of the family, dies young; Jens, the second son, shows the roving tendency of his namesake of two generations back and goes to America. The youngest, Ola, is something of a scholar and of little use in practical life; he becomes parish clerk. One daughter, Gjartru, marries an ex-sergeant named Arnesen and they keep a store at Segelsund, down on the fjord. The other daughter, Aasel, marries a man from the South, and it is left for her to carry on the family and the farm of Haaberg.

=== The Big Wedding ===
The date of The Big Wedding (Storbybryllope, published in Norway in 1920 and in America in 1931) is about 1880. Blind Anders is still alive, well over seventy. The Arnesens have a daughter, Mina, who is engaged to Arthur Ween, son of the local vet. Aasel’s son, Peder, is to take over Haaberg on finding a suitable wife. One of his cousins at Juvik is with child by him, but his mother does not think her good enough and gets her to relinquish her claim. Ola has been courting Andrea Ween, Arthur’s sister, in a half-hearted way; piqued by his backwardness she throws him over and accepts his nephew Peder. The double wedding, Mina’s and Peder’s, is celebrated at Haaberg. Uncle Jens arrives on a visit from America, where he has made money. In the middle of the festivities Petter plays a last prank on his blind brother and it results in the death of Anders. Arnesen, who has been speculating in herrings, learns that he is ruined. He and Gjartru go to America with Jens. Peder dies of consumption very soon after taking over Haaberg; he leaves a daughter, Astri.

=== Odin in Fairyland ===
Originally released in Norway as I eventyre (literally, "in a fairytale") in 1921, and in America in 1933, the fourth book begins the story of Odin Setran which occupies the remaining three books. Ola Haaberg, the parish clerk, had always been looking for “him who should come,” a scion of the race who should inherit the virtues of the old Juvikings and as it were justify the whole family. Odin is the one who fulfills this hope. He is the illegitimate son of Aasel’s daughter Elen, by one Otte Setran, a joiner by trade, who emigrates to America before the boy is born. In Odin in Fairyland we have the story of his childhood. When he is seven years old his mother marries a farmer named Iver Vennestad, and Odin is put out to serve as herd-boy on a small holding called Kjelvik. The people there, Bendek and Gurianna, are kind to him, and he has many adventures as he discovers the world around him. His father returns from America and asks if Odin would like to go and live with him, but the boy prefers to stay at Kjelvik. Now there are certain secrets in Bendek’s life which are best let alone, and when Odin stumbles upon one of these the old man flies into a rage and turns him out of the house on a stormy Christmas night. Odin reaches Vennestad more dead than alive, and his mother and stepfather keep him there. Till one day Gurianna comes over with the news that Bendek is ill and wishes to see Odin. The lad at once goes back to Kjelvik and stays there till Bendek dies. It is here that we first meet with Lauris, who is destined to play an all-important part in the books which follow. He is a lad four years older than Odin, and a relative of Bendek; a wily rascal who is not above petty thieving. Odin with his generous nature is no unfriendly to Lauris, though he feels from the first that some day he will have to come to grips with him. Otte Setran, who has been carrying on his trade in the neighborhood, is suspected of having set fire to his cottage for the insurance money, whereupon Odin, whose instinct always prompts him to take the loser’s part, volunteers to go and live with him. In the last scene of this book Odin is overtaken by a storm while rowing a girl called Ingri Arnesen across the fjord. The boat capsizes and they are rescued with difficulty.

=== Odin Grows Up ===
Published in Norway as I ungdommen (literally, "in youth") in 1922, Odin Grows Up was released in America in 1934. This penultimate book in the saga of the Juvikings finds Odin a little grown up, out of his "fairyland", but still in the midst of youth and innocence. He falls in love with his cousin, Astri, but their respective parents fall in love with each other and ruin their prospects as a couple. Odin at first wants to fight for their happiness, but Astri gives up on their chances and actually encourages the older couple to marry. In the face of this devastating turn of events, Odin leaves the farm at Haaberg and joins his old sometimes friend, sometimes enemy, Lauris, at sea. The two sail the Northern seas for a while, fishing for and selling herring, but business is little to Odin's taste. Odin becomes exposed to Lauris' womanizing, and feels even less inclined to it. After a long time, he returns to Haaberg, only to find his father and Astri's mother ready to marry. Odin, however does not fight for her now, even though Astri now hopes that he will. Faced with this mutual disappointment, the couple drift apart, each going their separate ways in life. Astri somehow becomes romantically involved with Lauris, and the two marry, despite his proven unfaithfulness in the past. Meanwhile, Aasel, the eldest living Juviking, wonders what to do with Haaberg since none of her grandchildren show promise of producing a satisfying heir. She decides to divine the farm into three portions, selling one to Odin, one to Astri and the other to a stranger who is actually working for Lauris. Astri and Lauris, as well as old Ola, are against dividing the farm, though Odin finally supports it as it is Aasel's wish. Aasel soon passes away, and at her funeral ale Odin decides to establish a poorhouse, which he believes to have been Aasel's will, and attempts to convince his friends and neighbors to help him in this endeavour, though he is opposed again by Ola Haaberg and Astri. Finally, Odin reunites with a girl he has met once before—at the end of Odin in Fairyland—Ingri Arnesen, who he recognizes as the girl of his childhood dreams. The book ends with Odin and Ingri together, having decided to face the world together.

=== The Storm ===
The Storm (I stormen), published in Norway in 1923 and in America in 1935, covers the later life, and eventually death, of Odin Setran. Odin and Ingri have been married for about twenty years now, and have had two sons, Anders and Per. Lauris and Astri, too, have two children: Arne and Peder. The two couples both live on Haaberg, which has been separated into thirds; Odin owns a third, and Lauris the other two-thirds, which he obtained through trickery. In the interval years between Odin Grows Up and this novel, Odin has started up a factory producing herring oil, which is owned in shares by several men in the parish. Facing things like labor strikes, dissatisfied shareholders, and the ambition of men like Lauris and Engelbert Olsen, Odin works to keep the factory on an even keel. At a meeting of the shareholders, Odin loses his place as the man in charge, replaced by Lauris. Lauris, however soon takes ill and Odin is forced to perform his old job anyway. Meanwhile, Bonsach Arnesen, Ingri's father, is given a management position at the factory, which he soon resigns due to fear that his past (he had served time in jail for a minor crime) would cause Ingri and Odin suffering. Meanwhile, Lauris and Engelbert work at a plot to discredit Odin in the eyes of the parish. Engelbert attempts to spread gossip about Ingri and her father, which ends in an encounter between him and Odin, in which Odin drives him into the sea. Engelbert washes up on shore the next day, where Lauris persuades him to flee the parish secretly, so that Lauris can charge Odin with murder. Meanwhile, a letter found by Mina of Segelsund upon the suicide of old Ola Haaberg reveals a minor crime of Lauris', which Mina eventually takes to the sheriff. Because of this, Astri is caught between her feelings of duty and love for Lauris, and her conscience which will not allow her to tell a lie. Astri ultimately decides to tell the truth, and because of this they are spared public embarrassment. In reaction to Lauris' rumors, Odin is determined to kill Lauris, and bides his time. Eventually Astri falls ill, and Odin asks Lauris to go across the fjord to get the doctor. Because of the violent storm, Lauris tries to get out of it, but Odin is insistent. The doctor declines due to the weather, and on the way back to Haaberg the boat is overturned. Odin and Lauris realize that the boat will now only hold one of them, and they fight for survival. Odin wins, and Lauris floats helplessly in the sea. But Odin changes his mind, telling himself that he will not be a murderer. He lets Lauris have the boat, and drifts away supported by the oars. Eventually Odin washes up on shore, having drowned in the storm. At the funeral ale, his friends and family draw two conclusions: firstly, that by giving up his life to save his enemy, Odin had won a victory over Lauris; and secondly, that Lauris had become a different person after the ordeal. The series ends when Anders, Odin's eldest son, takes his mother home after the funeral ale.
