= Fosnes Chapel =

Church in Trøndelag, Norway

- Fosnes kapell
- Fosnes Chapel
- 64.68380258°N 11.30170762°E
- Location: Namsos Municipality, Trøndelag
- Country: Norway
- Denomination: Church of Norway
- Churchmanship: Evangelical Lutheran

History
- Status: Chapel
- Founded: 1926
- Consecrated: 1926

Architecture
- Functional status: Active
- Architectural type: Long church
- Completed: 1926 (100 years ago)

Specifications
- Capacity: 45
- Materials: Wood

Administration
- Diocese: Nidaros bispedømme
- Deanery: Namdal prosti
- Parish: Fosnes

Fosnes Chapel (Norwegian: Fosnes kapell) is a chapel of the Church of Norway in Namsos Municipality in Trøndelag county, Norway. It is located at Fosnesvågen, on the northeastern coast of the island of Jøa. It is an annex chapel for the Fosnes parish which is part of the Namdal prosti (deanery) in the Diocese of Nidaros. The white, wooden chapel was built in a long church style in 1926. The church seats about 45 people. The church is not regularly used for services, but it is used for funerals at the adjacent cemetery. There is an annual worship service held at the chapel once each summer at Olsok.

== History ==
For a long time, the church on the island of Jøa was located at Fosnes (along the Fosnavågen bay), where the Fosnes Chapel is now located. That church was at Fosnes from 1250 until 1896 when that church burned down. After that, there was much debate about where the church should be rebuilt. It was determined that the new parish church should be built in the village of Dun, in the middle of the island of Jøa since that was more centrally located for the population. After the new church was completed in 1900, there was another question about what to do with the cemetery at the old church site. In 1926, the present little chapel was built at the site of the old Fosnes church, next to the Fosnes Church cemetery which is still in use.

== See also ==
- List of churches in Nidaros
