= Hans Goksøyr =

Norwegian businessman

Hans Goksøyr (10 February 1923 – 24 August 2016) was a Norwegian businessperson in the petroleum industry.

He was born in Eidsvoll, and took his secondary education at Oslo Cathedral School in 1943. He then enrolled in the Royal Norwegian Air Force in-exile in Canada, serving in World War II. After the war he returned to Norway, enrolling at the Norwegian Institute of Technology in 1946. He graduated in 1951, and then worked as a research assistant and fellow until 1954. In 1955, he was hired in Shell Norway, advancing to director of planning, public relations and environment in his later career. He left Shell in 1984, and was secretary-general in the Norwegian Petroleum Institute from 1985 to 1989.

Goksøyr was also an amateur painter, and in 1954 he was represented with two works at the national Autumn Exhibit, Høstutstillingen. His other hobbies included golf and giving lectures. He settled in Nesøya in 1963, was married and had two sons. He died in August 2016 at the age of 93.
