= Olav Duun =

Norwegian writer (1876–1939)

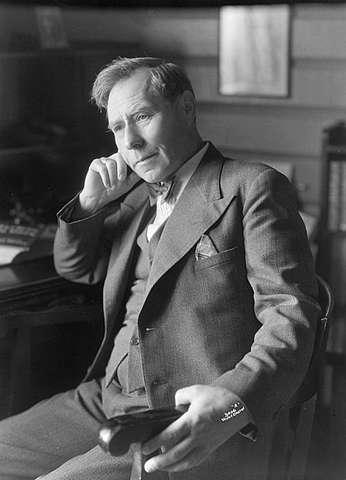
Olav Duun in 1936.

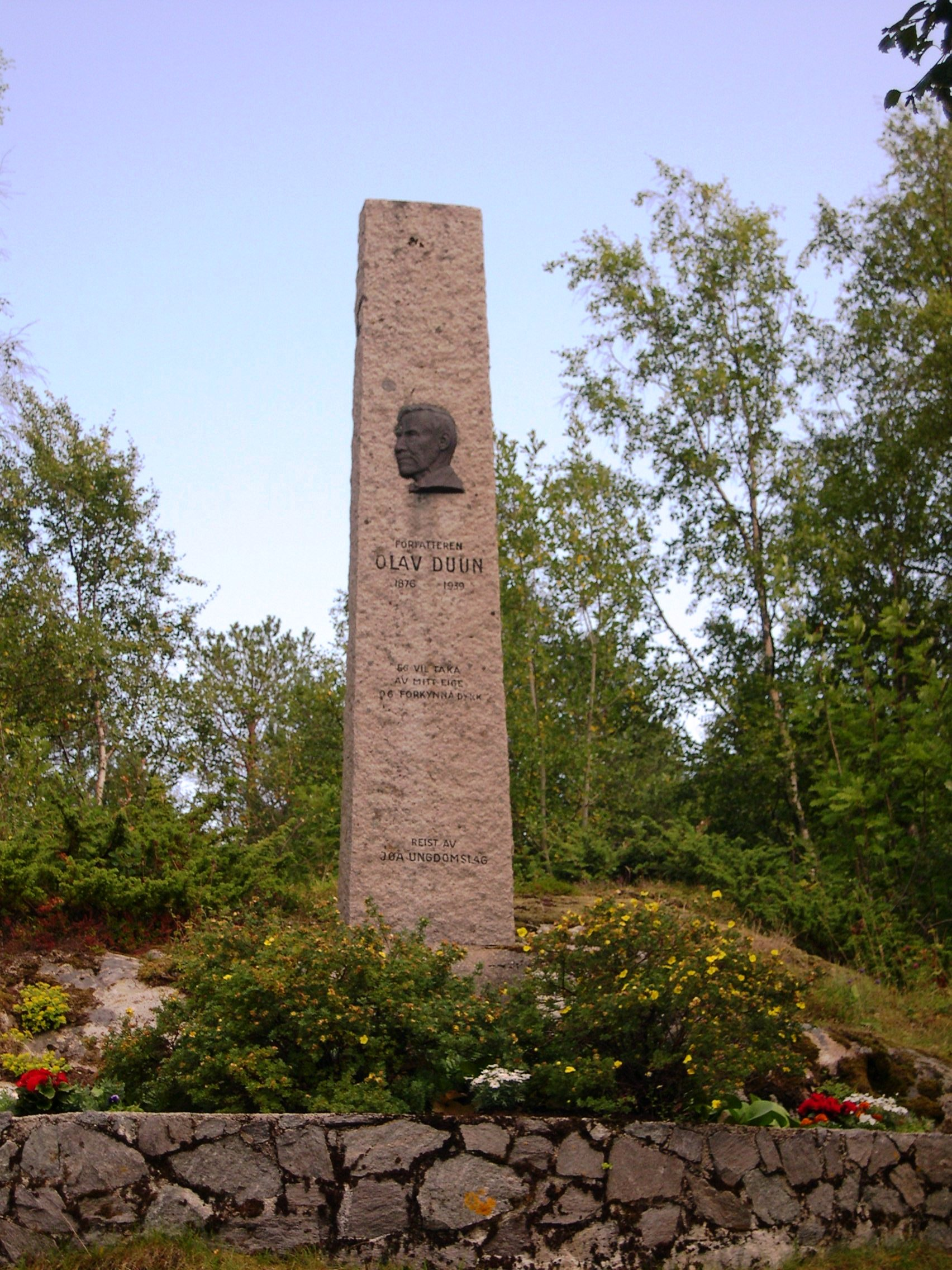
Memorial stone for Olav Duun, at the farm where he grew up, Øver-Dun. The location is Jøa, in Fosnes Municipality, Norway

Olav Duun (21 November 1876 – 13 September 1939) was a writer of Norwegian fiction. He is generally recognized to be one of the more outstanding writers in Norwegian literature. He was nominated for the Nobel Prize in Literature twenty-four times in fourteen years, and once lacked only one vote to receive the prize.

== Early life ==
Duun was born in the traditional district of Outer Namdalen, on the island of Jøa which is located in the Namsenfjorden in Fosnes Municipality in Nord-Trøndelag county, Norway. His parents were Johannes Antonius Duun and Ellen (Fossum) Duun. Olav Duun was born Ole Johannesen Raaby. Duun was the oldest in a family of eight siblings. During his years as a boy his family lived at several farms on the island, the last one being Duun. He adopted the last name Duun when he left the island to start his training as a teacher.

He attended the state school at Trondheim. In 1901, Duun took a position as a school teacher in Levanger Municipality in Nord-Trøndelag county, Norway.

== After accepting a post as a teacher ==
He completed the graduate teacher examination in 1904. In 1908, he was hired by the Ramberg school at Botne Municipality in Vestfold county, where he combined teaching profession with writing poetry. He worked as a teacher in Holmestrand Municipality until 1927. At the age of fifty, he retired in order to devote his time to writing.

== Writing career ==
Duun was known as one of the outstanding writers of 20th-century Norwegian fiction. He stands as a remarkable synthesis of the Norwegian folk spirit and the European cultural form. Duun wrote in Landsmål, an amalgam of peasant dialects that developed into Nynorsk, one of the official languages of Norway. In the period 1907-38 he published 25 novels, four short story collections ("sagas" was his own genre term) and two children's books. Many of his books incorporate the dialects of his subjects: peasants, fishermen and farmers. His novels analyze the psychological and spiritual characteristics of rural, peasant life. Contact with family traditions is a strength for the heroes in his historical novels, and awareness of those who have lived before, and the strength of their actions can help modern people through crises.

His most notable work is the six-volume The People of Juvik, which deals a family of peasant landowners over four generations. The work was translated into English and published in six books: The Trough of the Wave (1930), The Blind Man (1931), The Big Wedding (1932), Odin in Fairyland (1932), Odin Grows Up (1934) and Storm (1935).

Olav Duun was nominated for the Nobel Prize in Literature twenty-four times between 1924 and 1939. Certain about a rumour that Duun was going to be awarded the prize in 1926, the Norwegian newspaper Aftenposten wrongly announced Duun as the winner of the Nobel Prize in Literature on its front page on 11 November 1926 before the Swedish Academy's announcement of George Bernard Shaw as the winner later that day, causing a publication scandal in Norway. Duun lost to Shaw by just one vote.

== Legacy ==
=== Former residence, now library ===
Olav and Emma Duun's House (Olav og Emma Duuns Hus) is the former residence of Olav Duun and his wife Emma, at Ramberg in Holmestrand Municipality. There is a library containing manuscripts, letters, and other things related to the writing career of Olav Duun. The first floor is at the disposal of recipients of the Duun Scholarship. In the garden, a memorial park has been constructed containing commemorative rocks with lyrical quotes from Olav Duun’s poems. The address is 20 Olav Duun Street.

== Bibliography ==
- 1907: Oddballs and Other People (Løglege skruvar og anna folk)
- 1908: Marjane
- 1909: Crosswise (På tvert)
- 1910: The Slope by Nøkk Lake (Nøkksjøliga)
- 1911: Old Soil (Gamal jord)
- 1912: Hilder Island (Hilderøya), Storbåten
- 1913: Sigyn, Sommareventyr
- 1914: Three Friends (Tre venner)
- 1915: Harald
- 1916: Good Conscience (Det gode samvite)
- 1917: At Heather Island (På Lyngsøya)
- 1918-23: The People of Juvik (Juvikfolket)
  - 1918: The Trough of the Waves (Juvikingar)
  - 1919: The Blind Man (I Blinda)
  - 1920: The Big Wedding (Storbybryllope)
  - 1921: Odin in Fairyland (I eventyret)
  - 1922: Odin Grows Up (I ungdommen)
  - 1923: The Storm (I stormen)
- 1924: Blind-Anders
- 1925: Straumen og evja
- 1927: Olsøygutane
- 1928: Carolus Magnus
- 1929: Fellow Man (Medmenneske)
- 1930: On the Road and Getting Lost (Vegar og villstig)
- 1931: Ragnhild
- 1932: A Reputation Left Behind (Ettermæle)
- 1933: The Final Year of Life (Siste leveåre)
- 1935: God Smiles (Gud smiler)
- 1936: The Present Age (Samtid)
- 1938: Floodtide of Fate (Menneske og maktene)

== Awards ==
- 1934 - Gyldendal's Endowment (initial award of this prize)
- 1935 - Henrik Steffens Prize (initial award of this prize)
