= Odvar Omland =

Norwegian politician (1923–2025)

- Born: 18 July 1923
- Died: 2 July 2025 (aged 101)

Odvar Omland (18 July 1923 – 2 July 2025) was a Norwegian politician for the Christian Democratic Party.

Omland served as a deputy representative to the Norwegian Parliament from Akershus during the terms 1977–1981.

On the local level, he held several positions, including as a municipal councillor in Kragerø Municipality; as both Deputy Mayor and Mayor of Sauherad Municipality; and three terms as a member of the municipal council of Asker Municipality, including spells as Deputy Mayor and Mayor between 1992 and 1995.

He stood again in the 2019 municipal and county council elections, aged 96, the oldest candidate in the country.

== Personal life and death ==
Omland was married to his wife Ester until her death from Alzheimer's disease in 2016.

Omland died on 2 July 2025, at the age of 101.
