= Jøa =

Island in Trøndelag, Norway

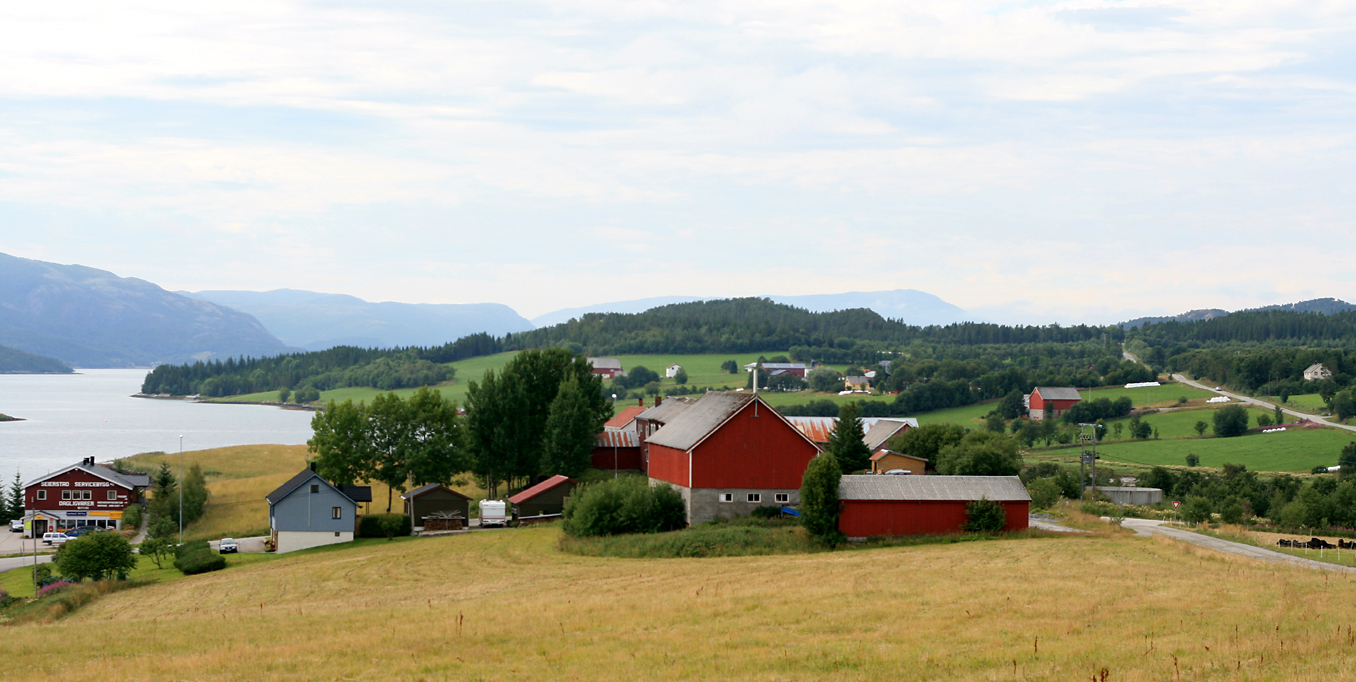
- Interactive map of Jøa

Geography
- Location: Trøndelag, Norway
- Coordinates: 64.6481°N 11.2096°E
- Area: 55.3 km^{2} (21.4 sq mi)
- Length: 11 km (6.8 mi)
- Width: 10 km (6 mi)
- Highest elevation: 297 m (974 ft)
- Highest point: Moldvikfjellet

Administration
- Norway
- County: Trøndelag
- Municipality: Namsos Municipality

Demographics
- Population: 566 (2001)
- Pop. density: 10.2/km^{2} (26.4/sq mi)

Jøa is an island in Namsos Municipality in Trøndelag county, Norway. The 55.3-square-kilometre (21.4 sq mi) island lies on the south side of the Foldafjord, between the mainland and the islands of Otterøya and Elvalandet. The island is partially forested, with the southern part being flat and marshy, and the northern part being more mountainous. The 297-metre (974 ft) tall Moldvikfjellet is the highest point on the island.

The Norwegian writer Olav Duun was born in the village of Dun, in the central part of the island, where Dun Church is located. Also, Fosnes Chapel is located on the northeastern coast of the island, at the site of the old church and graveyard.

== See also ==
- Lists of islands of Norway
