= 1994 in Norway =

- Centuries: 18th; 19th; 20th; 21st
- Decades: 1970s; 1980s; 1990s; 2000s; 2010s
- See also: List of years in Norway

Events in the year 1994 in Norway.

== Incumbents ==
- Monarch – Harald V.
- Prime Minister – Gro Harlem Brundtland (Labour Party)
- President of the Storting – Kirsti Kolle Grøndahl (Labour Party)

== Events ==
- 1 January – the Agreement on the European Economic Area comes into effect.
- 6 January – Grefsen Post Office is robbed for 1,1 million kr, the largest post office robbery in Norway to date.
- 7 January – Kaci Kullmann Five announces her stepping down as leader of the Conservative Party.
- 26 January – Biologist Dag Olav Hessen survives a hurricane on mount Norefjell, having gone missing since 22 January.
- 31 January – The Bjugn case reaches its verdict in Frostating Court; the accused party is acquitted.
- 12 February – Edvard Munch's painting The Scream is stolen from the National Gallery of Norway.
- 26 March – Elisabeth Andreassen and Jan Werner Danielsen win the Melodi Grand Prix 1994, earning a spot in the Eurovision Song Contest 1994.
- 10 April – Jan Petersen is formally elected as the new leader of the Conservative Party.
- 15–17 April – The Progress Party national convention at Bolkesjø results in with the libertarian section of the party losing all power to the traditionalists.
- 22 April – Explorer Børge Ousland becomes the first person to reach the North Pole unsupported on foot.
- 7 May – The Scream is recovered and three men arrested for its theft and attempt to sell the painting, among them Pål Enger.
- 9 May – Explorer Erling Kagge summits Mount Everest, thus becoming the first person to complete the "Three Poles Challenge".
- 16 May – Musician Varg Vikernes is sentenced in Eidsivating Court to 21 years of prison for murder and arson.
- 24 May – Minister of Finance Sigbjørn Johnsen survives a vote of no confidence in Parliament, related to the recent appointment of Torstein Moland as Bank of Norway governor.
- 18 June – A strike among NRK personnel ends in a deal between the unions and NRK, having lasted since the previous Sunday.
- 30 June – A strike among nurses is subdued by the government of Norway, following less than three days of striking.
- 1 July – The emergency phone numbers change from 001, 002 and 003 to 110 (fire), 112 (police) and 113 (ambulance).
- 2 July – Artist Sigmund Årseth decorates a barn in Vang i Valdres with a caricature of Gro Harlem Brundtland milking a cow, becoming one of the iconic expressions of the EU debate in Norway.
- 15 August – Per Hatling announces his resignation as chief executive officer of Norske Meierier, effective 1 September.
- 21 August – A bomb attack is perpetrated against the Blitz House at 03:42 hours, but injures none.
- 16 September – The jeweller David-Andersen in downtown Oslo is robbed of 2 million kr worth of jewelry.
- 28 September – Six Norwegians die in the MS Estonia disaster.
- 28–29 September – Torp hostage crisis: Two Swedish robbers take two police officers and two pensioners hostage at the Sandefjord Airport, Torp. The police free the hostages and kill one of the hostage takers. It is the first incident in peace time that a Norwegian police chief has given the orders to shoot to kill.
- 7 October – Kåre Kristiansen retires from the Norwegian Nobel Committee following the committee's decision to co-award Yassir Arafat the Nobel Peace Prize.
- 13 October – Fugitive Souhaila Andrawes is arrested at Grefsen for her role in the 1977 Lufthansa Flight 181 airjacking.
- 15 October – Death of Silje Redergård
- 31 October – Arne Solli becomes Chief of Defence of Norway, succeeding Torolf Rein.
- 1 November – Two new currencies are put into circulation, the 20 kr coin and the 200 kr bill.
- 21 November – Per Liland is exhonorated by Eidsivating Court for a double murder committed in 1969, though having already served a life sentence in prison.
- 28 November – The 1994 Norwegian European Union membership referendum: Norway votes no to EU membership, 15 days after Sweden votes yes.
- 8 December – The Hitra Tunnel is opened, being the world's deepest undersea tunnel at the depth of 264 metres.
- 10 December – The Nobel Peace Prize is formally awarded to Yassir Arafat, Shimon Peres and Yitzhak Rabin in Oslo.
- 12 December – Erik Jarve is fired as chief executive of Oslo Stock Exchange, effective immediately.
- 24 December – Liv Arnesen becomes the first woman to reach the South Pole by land.
- 27 December – Cato Zahl Pedersen becomes the first disabled person to reach the South Pole by land. His expedition party started alongside Liv Arnesen.

Date missing

- Reform 94 is implemented in secondary schools, giving vocational education the structure of two years in school, two years in business training.
- A reform in higher education merges hundreds of state colleges into selected university colleges.

== Anniversaries ==
- 15 April – Oslo Stock Exchange celebrates 175 years.
- 125 years since the establishment of Dagbladet.
- 250 years since the police force of Oslo was founded.

== Popular culture ==
=== Sports ===
- 6 January – Espen Bredesen wins the 1993-94 Four Hills Tournament.
- 7–9 January – the 1994 European Speed Skating Championships are held in Hamar.
- 5 February – The Olympic torch of in Morgedal, which was lit in 1993, is extinguished in favour of the official 1994 Winter Olympics relay torch that was lit at Olympia.
- 12–27 February – The 1994 Winter Olympics is held in Lillehammer.

Norway finishes second in the medals table, albeit with the highest number of overall medals.

- 13 February – As a part of Norway's performance at the 1994 Winter Olympics, Johann Olav Koss sets a new world record in 5000 metres speed skating in 6:34.96 minutes.
- 16 February – Johann Olav Koss sets a new world record in 1500 metres speed skating in 1:51.29 minutes.
- 20 February – Johann Olav Koss sets a new world record in 10,000 metres speed skating in 13:30.55 minutes.
- 10–19 March – The 1994 Winter Paralympics is held in Lillehammer.

Norway finishes atop the medals table with 64 medals, the tie-breaker with Germany being the number of gold medals, 29 versus 25.

- 18 March – Espen Bredesen breaks the world record in ski jumping, reaching 209 metres in training at the Ski Flying World Championships. The record will last for three years.
- 19 March – The 1993–94 FIS Alpine Ski World Cup concludes, with Kjetil André Aamodt emerging as the overall men's winner.
- 27 March – The 1993–94 FIS Ski Jumping World Cup concludes, with Espen Bredesen emerging as the overall men's winner.
- 19 May – Johann Olav Koss announces his decision to retire from active sports.
- 18–28 June – Norway contests the 1994 FIFA World Cup, their first World Cup outing since 1938, but are eliminated after three matches.
- 21 July – Benjamin Jensen wins the decathlon event at the 1994 World Junior Championships in Athletics.
- 26 July – Jan Kvalheim and Bjørn Maaseide win the 1994 Goodwill Games in beach volleyball.
- August – Jan Kvalheim and Bjørn Maaseide win the 1994 European Beach Volleyball Championships.
- 6 August – It is publicly announced that sprinter Aham Okeke failed two doping tests on 12 and 20 July. Okeke would have been a medal candidate at the 1994 European Athletics Championships, but is stopped at the airport before embarking the plane to Helsinki.
- 7–14 August – The 1994 European Athletics Championships is held with Norway winning 3 gold, 2 silver and 1 bronze medal.
- 9 August – the opening ceremony of the 14th World Fly Fishing Championships is held in Ringebu.
- 23 August – Monica Valvik wins the road race at the 1994 UCI Road World Championships.
- 10 September – football manager Nils Arne Eggen coins the term "rævafotball", meaning a destructive tactic in football, in the aftermath of the 1994 Football Cup semi-final between rivals Rosenborg BK and Molde FK. The word even entered the dictionary.
- 24 September – Norway win the bronze medal at the 1994 European Women's Handball Championship
- 24 September – the 1994 IAAF World Half Marathon Championships are held in Oslo. Norway wins silver in the women's team competition.
- 23 October – the 1994 Norwegian Football Cup final is uniquely contested by two teams from the second tier, with Molde FK beating SFK Lyn.
- 12 December – Christian Ruud reaches 83rd place on the ATP World Ranking, breaking into the top 100 for the first time.

Date unknown

- The 1994 World Powerlifting Championships in Lillehammer is moved to Johannesburg, following a drought in the sponsor market of the Olympic city.
- Marit Breivik becomes head coach of Norway women's national handball team.
- Petter Thoresen wins the 1994 Orienteering World Cup.

== Notable births ==
=== January to March ===
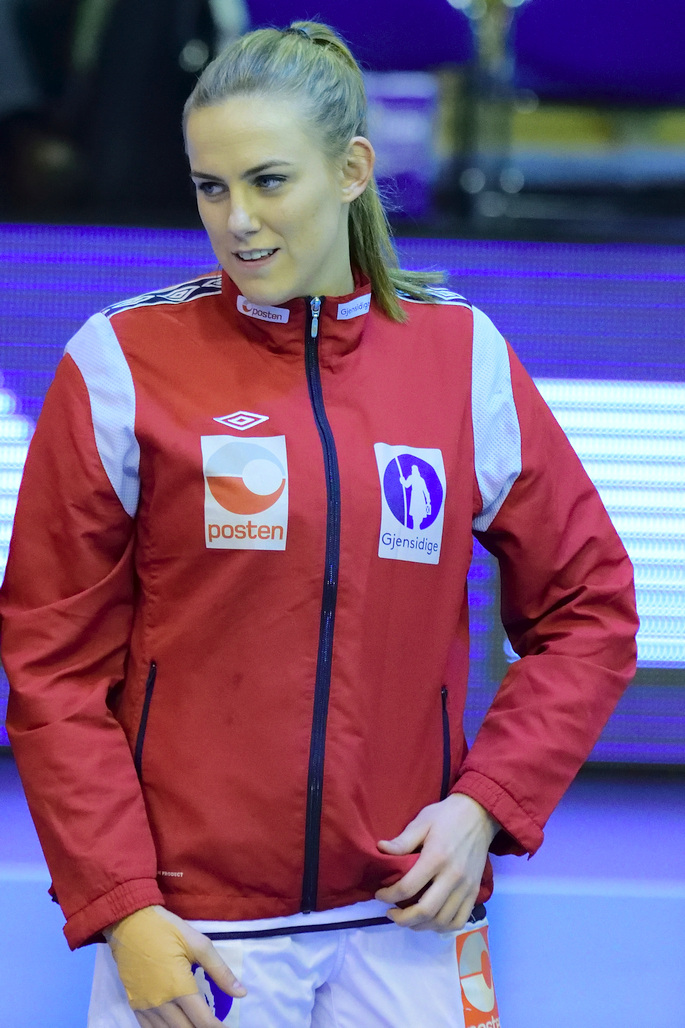
Emilie Hegh Arntzen

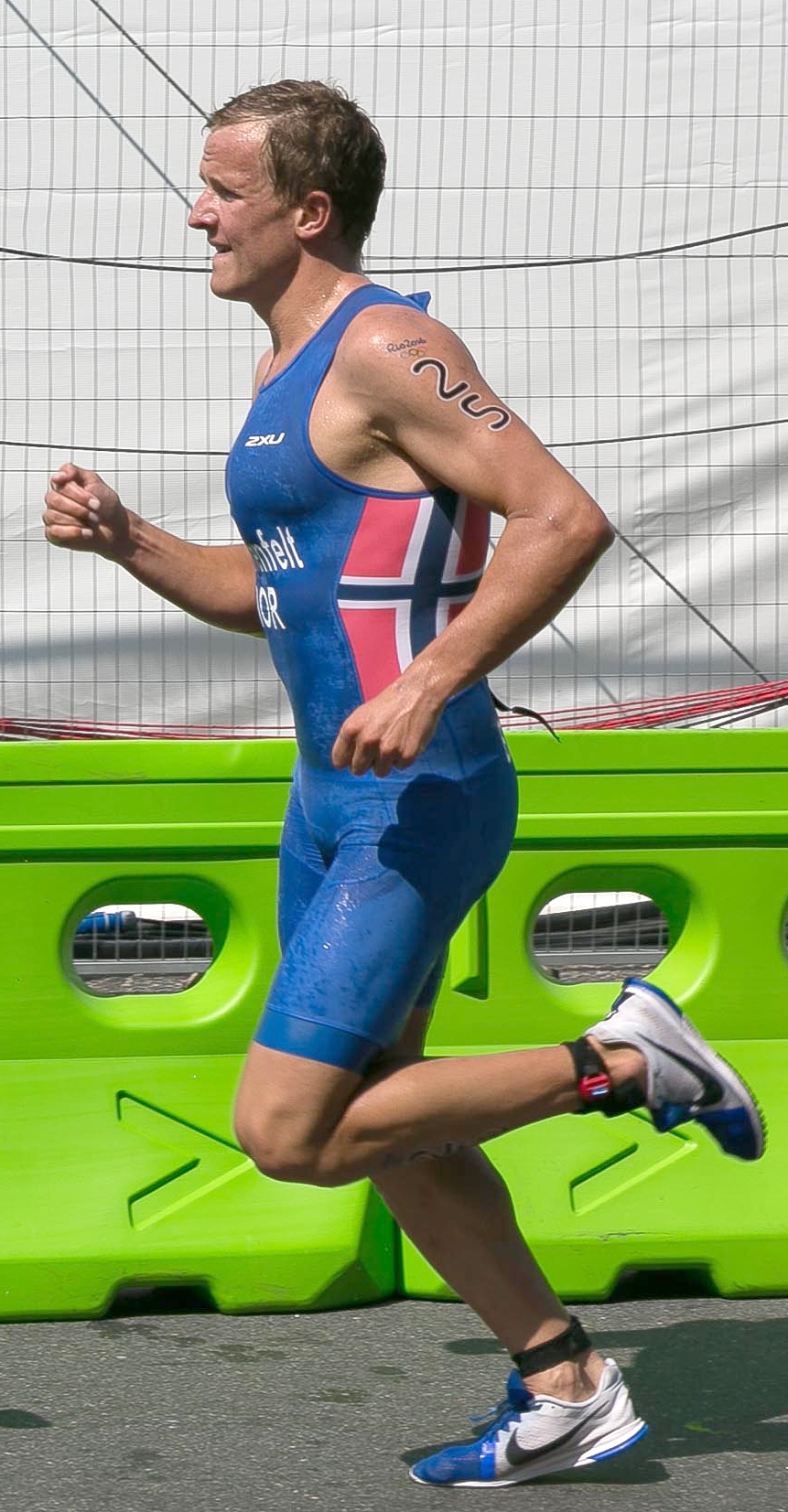
Kristian Blummenfelt

- 1 January – Emilie Hegh Arntzen, handball player.
- 4 January – Hermann Tomasgaard, competitive sailor.
- 7 January – Lisa Marie Ness Klungland, politician.
- 10 January – Ohi Omoijuanfo, footballer.
- 10 January – Robin Rasch, footballer
- 12 January – Markus Fjørtoft, footballer.
- 17 January – Kristoffer Haraldseid, footballer.
- 17 January – Eirik and Kristin Haugstad, footballers.
- 18 January – Magnus Blakstad, footballer.
- 25 February – Marit Røsberg Jacobsen, handballer.
- 27 January – Kristoffer Zachariassen, footballer.
- 27 January – Robin Bjørnholm-Jatta, footballer.
- 6 February – Vetle Dragsnes, footballer.
- 14 February – Kristian Blummenfelt, triathlete.
- 21 February – Kristoffer Haugen, footballer.
- 24 February – Fredrik Mani Pålerud, footballer.
- 5 March – Kristin Venn, handballer.
- 9 March – Henrik Dahlum, footballer.
- 13 March – Marie Rønningen, competitive sailor.
- 17 March – Renate Blindheim, football manager.
- 20 March – Silje Waade, handballer.
- 25 March – Jakob Glesnes, footballer.
- 29 March – Fredrik Sjølstad, footballer.

=== April to June ===
- 5 April – Isabel Raad, influencer-
- 6 April – Stefan Hagerup, footballer.
- 7 April – Maria Therese Tviberg, alpine skier.
- 9 April – Jo David Meyer Lysne, guitarist.
- 10 April – Anders Gundersen, footballer.
- 11 April – Marius Lundemo, footballer.
- 11 April – Jonas Grønner, footballer.
- 12 April – Julie Bergan, singer.
- 13 April – Veton Berisha, footballer.
- 18 April – Martin Rønning Ovenstad, footballer.
- 22 April – Christian Roger Beharie, singer-songwriter.
- 26 April – Gøran Johannessen, handballer.
- 27 April – Maria Navarro Skaranger, novelist.
- 1 May – Daniel Granli, footballer.
- 9 May – Martin Sesaker, curler.
- 11 May – Guro Kleven Hagen, classical violinist.
- 13 May – Ole Kristian Lauvli, footballer.
- 18 May – Simen Juklerød, footballer.
- 29 May – Nicholas Fadler Martinsen, competitive sailor.
- 5 June – Aleksander Foosnæs, footballer.
- 21 June – Sondre Mulongo Nystrøm, singer (born in Kenya).
- 24 June – August Baskår Pedersen, handballer.
- 30 June – Andreas Sjalg Unneland, politician.

=== July to September ===
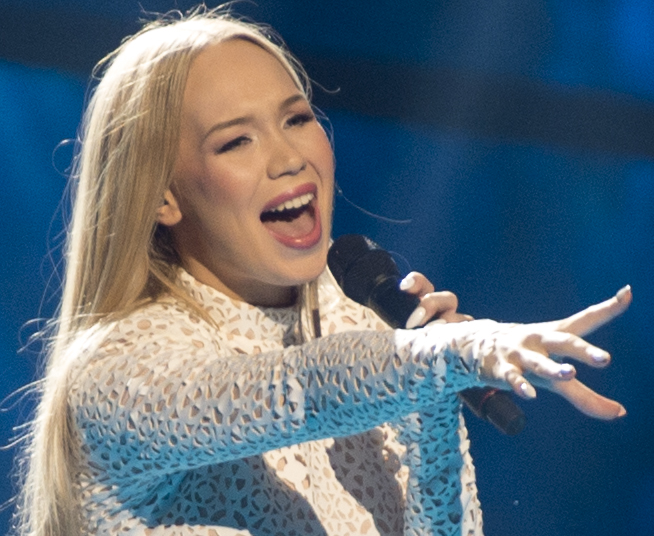
Agnete

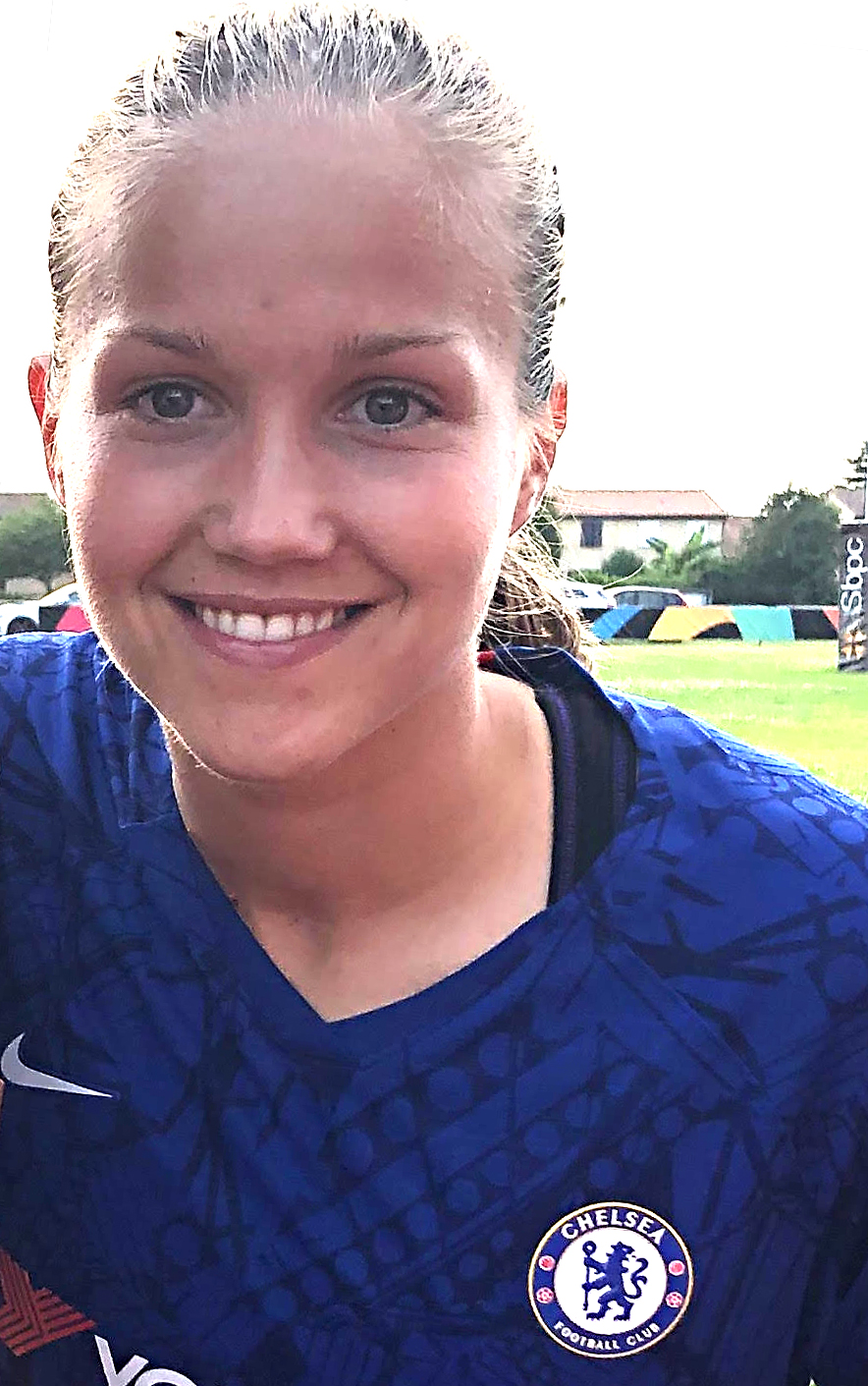
Guro Reiten

- 4 July – Hanna Bredal Oftedal, handballer.
- 4 July – Jon Anders Lindstad, freestyle skier.
- 4 July – Agnete Johnsen, singer.
- 7 July – Ole Selnæs, footballer.
- 11 July – Martin Helseth, competitive rower.
- 16 July – Adrian Smiseth Sejersted, alpine skier.
- 16 July – Torbjørn Bergerud, handballer.
- 22 July – Sigurd Rosted, footballer.
- 25 July – Vilde Johansen, handballer.
- 26 July – Pål Fjelde, footballer.
- 26 July – Guro Reiten, footballer.
- 4 August – Mohamed Elyounoussi, footballer (born in Morocco).
- 16 August – Eili Harboe, actress.
- 21 August – Tonje Enkerud, handballer.
- 24 August – Petter Strand, footballer.
- 30 August – Erik André Solbakken, competitive rower.
- 8 September – Ghayas Zahid, footballer.
- 13 September – Jibril Bojang, footballer.
- 23 September – Joachim Osvold, footballer.
- 25 September – Idar Nordby Lysgård, footballer.
- 25 September – Ingrid Stenevik, footballer.

=== October to December ===
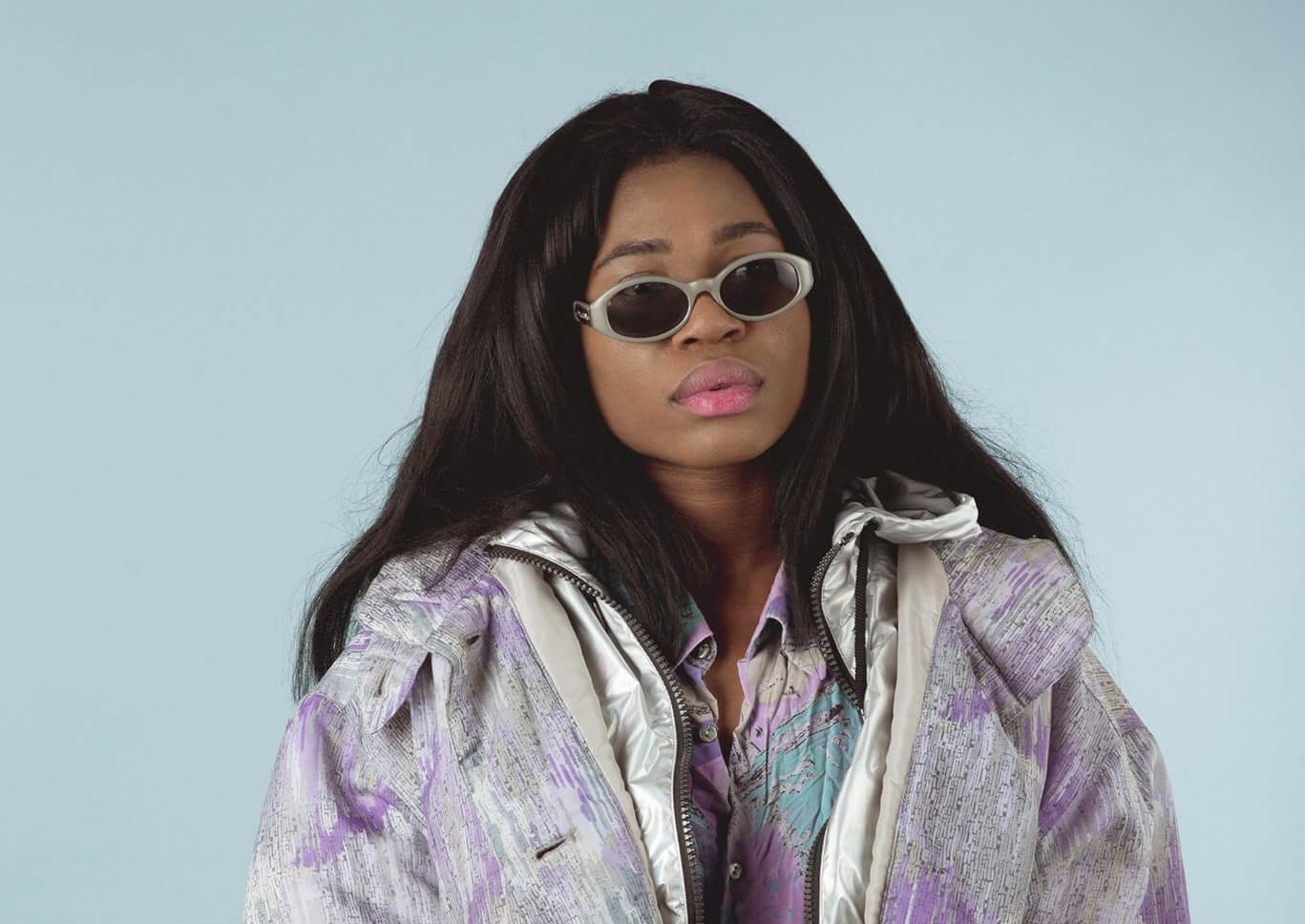
Myra

- 3 October – Andreas Hollingen, footballer.
- 4 October – Kai Steffen Østensen, politician.
- 8 October – Fitim Kastrati, footballer.
- 13 October – Olav Øby, footballer.
- 18 October – Sindre Mauritz-Hansen, footballer.
- 2 November – Aleksander Stokkebø, politician.
- 3 November – Felix Stridsberg-Usterud, freestyle skier.
- 9 November – Katrine Lund, sport shooter.
- 11 November – Martine Steller Mortensen, competitive sailor.
- 7 December – Viljar Vevatne, footballer.
- 8 December – Myra (born in Sierra Leone)
- 17 December – Birger Meling, footballer.
- 17 December – Johan Hoel, cross-country skier.
- 18 December – Vilde Ingstad, handballer.
- 18 December – Sophie Elise, influencer.
- 31 December – Espen Garnås, footballer.

=== Date missing ===
- Emily Sørensen, fantasy author.
- Svanhild Amdal Telnes, author.
- Kine Olsen Vedelden, cheerleader.

== Notable deaths ==
=== January ===
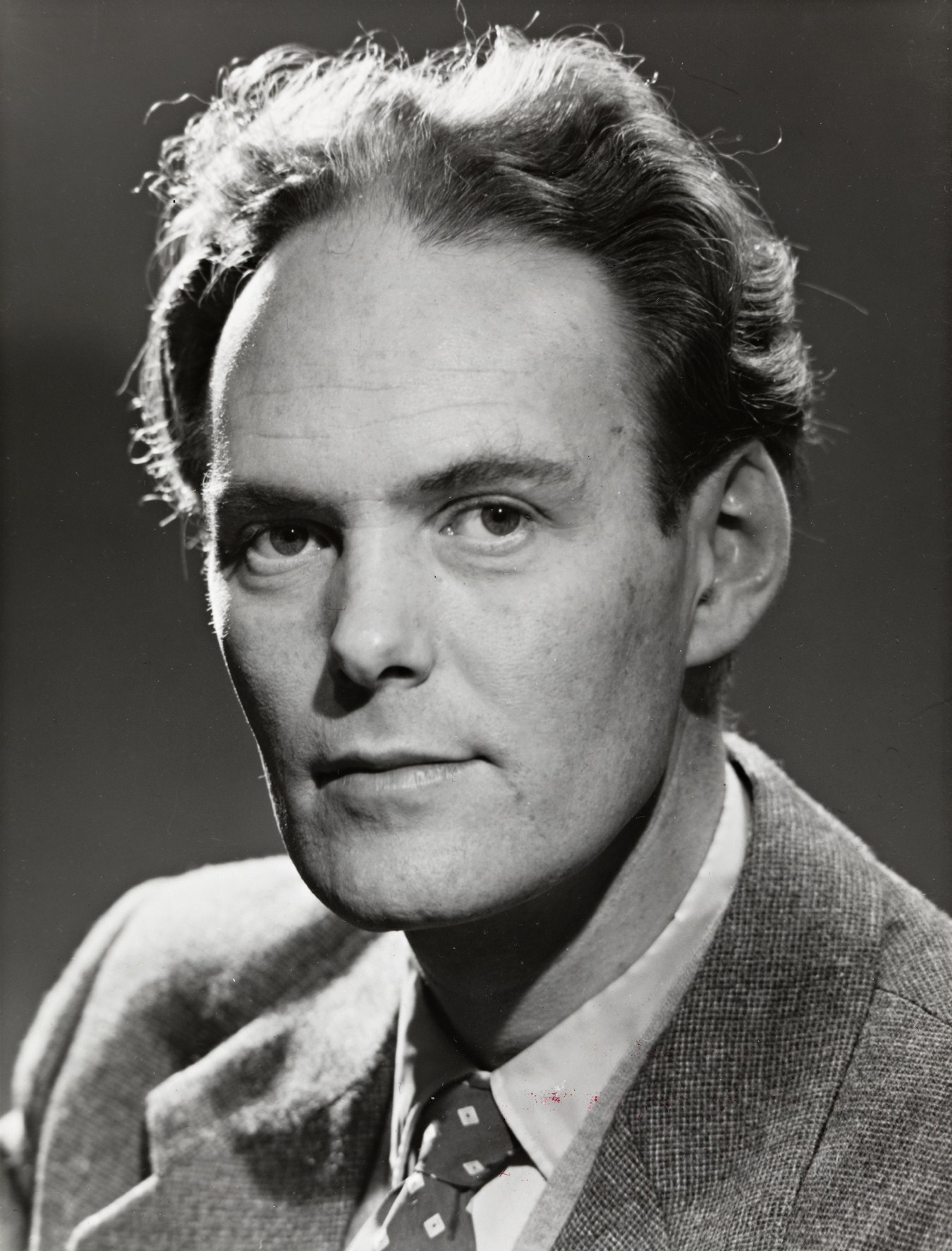
Agnar Mykle

- 6 January – Per Palle Storm, sculptor (born 1910).
- 7 January – Øistein Sommerfeldt, composer (born 1919).
- 7 January – Ernst Hansen, politician (born 1912).
- 7 January – Edvard Elsrud, non-fiction writer (born 1926).
- 8 January – Harry Boye Karlsen, footballer (born 1920).
- 10 January – Per Skift, actor (born 1920).
- 12 January – Teddy Røwde, painter (born 1912).
- 14 January – Agnar Mykle, author (born 1915).
- 15 January – Jørgen Adolf Lier, politician (born 1906)
- 18 January – Tullik Helsing, sports diver (born 1918).
- 20 January – Einar Bårdsen, politician (born 1925).
- 23 January – Johan Jørgen Holst, politician (born 1937).
- 24 January – Helge Vatsend, lyricist and novelist (born 1928).
- 24 January – Astri Fosser, politician (born 1900).
- 25 January – Unni Kielland, painter (born 1911).
- 26 January – Arnt J. C. Mørland, ship-owner (born 1921).
- 28 January – Harald Løvenskiold, businessperson (born 1926).
- 29 January – Jacob Vaage, historian and museum curator (born 1905).
- 30 January – Finn Arnestad, composer (born 1915).

=== February ===
- 4 February – Per Gulowsen, diplomat (born 1920).
- 9 February – Tom Pettersen, swimmer (born 1935).
- 14 February – Halfdan Petterøe, equestrian (born 1906).
- 15 February – Reidar Bull, judge (born 1909).
- 15 February – Rafael Goldin, museum director (born 1920).
- 20 February – Kaare Steel Groos, politician (born 1917)
- 20 February – Rolf Jacobsen, writer (born 1907).
- 23 February – Ragnar Christiansen, politician (born 1922)
- 23 February – Odd Højdahl, trade unionist and politician (born 1921).
- 24 February – Tor Ørvig, paleontologist (born 1916, died in Sweden).
- 26 February – Odd Furøy, painter (born 1908).
- 28 February – Arne Ekeland, painter (born 1908).

=== March ===
- 3 March – Tønnes Sirevåg, school principal (born 1909).
- 5 March – Tor Frøysaker, physician (born 1929).
- 7 March – Rolf Rynning Eriksen, resistance member (born 1911).
- 7 March – Arild Kalvik, trade unionist (born 1918).
- 8 March – Knut Haukelid, resistance member (born 1911).
- 13 March – Magne Lerheim, politician (born 1929).
- 14 March – Solveig Tunold, literary historian (born 1900).
- 15 March – Erling Sverdrup, resistance member and statistician (born 1917).
- 16 March – Asbjørn Andersen, politician (born 1941).
- 21 March – Paula Nordhus, politician (born 1935)
- 27 March – Vigdis Rojahn, children's writer (born 1902).
- 28 March – Sten Nilsen, illustrator (born 1921).
- 30 March – Bjørn Aronsen, animation film director (born 1926).

=== April ===
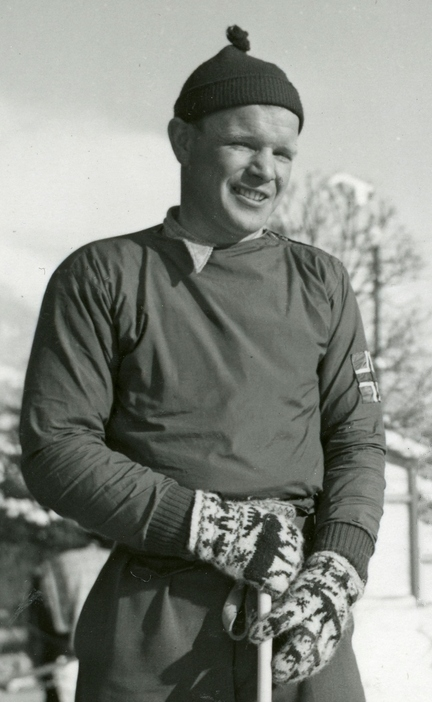
Sigmund Ruud

- 2 April – Inggard Rosseland, painter and printmaker (born 1914).
- 2 April – Rowland Greenberg, jazz trumpeter (born 1920).
- 7 April – Sigmund Ruud, ski jumper (born 1907).
- 7 April – Karl Otto Hoff, jazz drummer (born 1930).
- 9 April – Bjarne Fidjestøl, philologist (born 1937).
- 10 April – Finn Emanuel Olsen, painter and writer (born 1911).
- 11 April – Unn Kleve, printmaker (born 1923).
- 15 April – Finn Alexander, civil servant (born 1909).
- 19 April – Nina Smid, politician (born 1907).
- 20 April – Egil Sundar, newspaper editor (born 1932).
- 20 April – Sigmund Selberg, mathematician (born 1910).
- 24 April – Leif B. Lillegaard, writer (born 1918).
- 24 April – Ivar Jerven, painter and printmaker (born 1924).
- 24 April – Marta Schumann, novelist (born 1919).
- 25 April – Per Tannum, furniture designer (born 1912).
- 28 April – Olav Nordrå, writer (born 1919)
- 29 April – Kaleb Nytrøen, police officer (born 1905).
- 29 April – Rein Henriksen, lawyer and industrialist (born 1915).

=== May ===
- 1 May – Gunnar Fredriksen, athlete (born 1907).
- 7 May – Erik Kullerud, children's writer (born 1926).
- 8 May – Einar Diesen, newspaper editor (born 1897).
- 8 May – Rolf Sjøl, businessperson (born 1921).
- 18 May – Hans Stenseth, flautist (born 1896).
- 22 May – Harald Reinertsen, politician (born 1904).
- 23 May – Olav H. Hauge, poet (born 1908).
- 28 May – Erik Rinde, jurist and social scientist (born 1919)
- 29 May – Aasta Voss, actress (born 1914).

=== June ===
- 2 June – Odd Dahl, nuclear physicist (born 1898, died in the US).
- 2 June – Ole Hegge, cross-country skier (born 1900)
- 16 June – Chrix Dahl, painter, printmaker and illustrator (born 1906).
- 16 June – Ivar Orgland, philologist (born 1921).
- 17 June – Eigil Olaf Liane, politician (born 1916)
- 21 June – Jan Fredrik Wiborg, civil engineer (born 1944)
- 24 June – Thorstein Guthe, fencer (born 1912).
- 25 June – Helga Waabenø, missionary (born 1908).
- 26 June – Jan-Erik Aarberg, sailor (born 1924).

=== July ===
- 4 July – Liv Nilsson, trade unionist (born 1943).
- 6 July – Kåre Prytz, writer (born 1926).
- 6 July – Knut Lykke, diplomat (born 1904).
- 6 July – Olav Benestad, activist (born 1942).
- 12 July – Finn Andreas Westbye, musician (born 1914).
- 12 July – Arne Johnson, illustrator (born 1994).
- 16 July – Dagfinn Mannsåker, archivist and historian (born 1916)
- 26 July – Knud Haaning, painter (born 1929).
- 29 July – Gorgus Coward, school administrator (born 1912).

=== August ===
- 3 August – Fritz Harstrup, ceramist (born 1951).
- 4 August – Rolf Greger Strøm, luger (born 1940).
- 5 August – Paul Sæthrang, footballer (born 1918).
- 16 August – Erik Anker, sailor (born 1903)
- 16 August – Kaare Espolin Johnson, painter (born 1907).
- 18 August – Anfinn Stigen, philosopher (born 1923).
- 23 August – Lars Holen, politician (born 1912)
- 25 August – Leif Eldring, judge and civil servant (born 1933).
- 25 August – Ingrid Wyller, rector (born 1896).
- 30 August – Olav Gjærevoll, botanist and politician (born 1916).

=== September ===
- 2 September – Jan Willums, businessperson (born 1916, died in Belgium).
- 4 September – Gert Jynge, painter (born 1904).
- 9 September – Soffi Schønning, opera singer (born 1894).
- 9 September – Hagbarth Schjøtt Sr., businessperson (born 1894).
- 15 September – Peter Theodor Viken, politician (born 1930).
- 15 September – Kai Sjøberg, footballer (born 1936).
- 20 September – Bjarne Øen, Chief of Defence (born 1898).
- 24 September – Stein Hamnes, politician (born 1940).

=== October ===
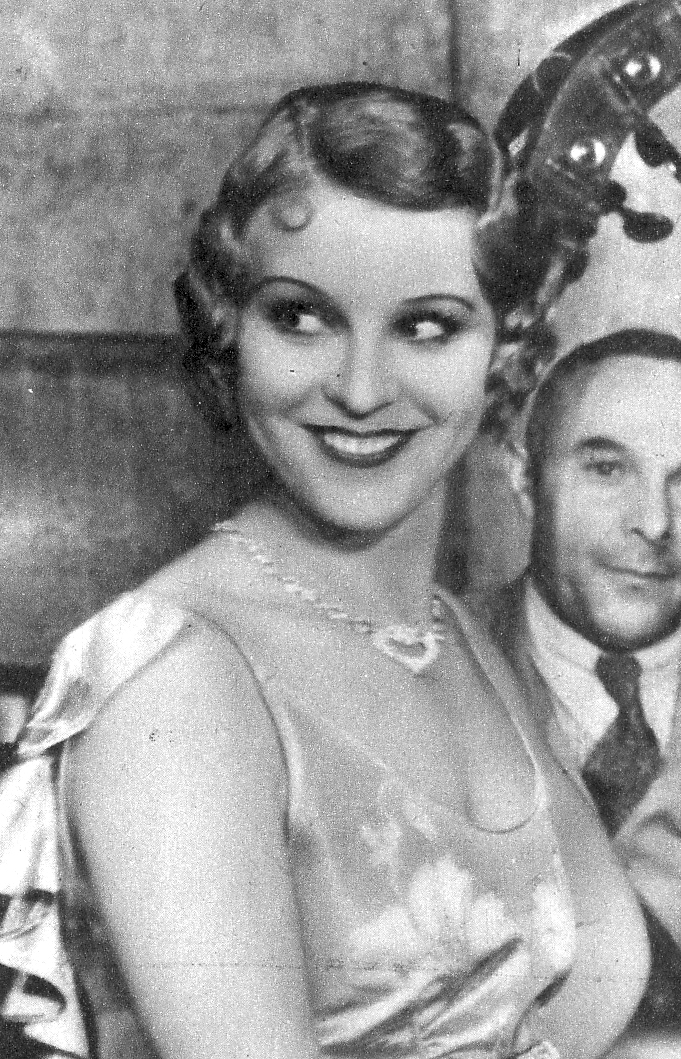
Tutta Rolf

- 5 October – Anker Rogstad, criminal and crime novelist (born 1925).
- 5 October – Harald Ofstad, philosopher (born 1920).
- 6 October – Per Mørch Hansson, businessperson (born 1905).
- 7 October – Agnes Vold, priest (born 1912).
- 8 October – Ivan Th. Rosenqvist, geologist (born 1916).
- 12 October – Edel Eckblad, actress (born 1914)
- 15 October – Dagny Haraldsen, Queen mother (born 1898).
- 18 October – Ivar Kornelius Eikrem, politician (born 1898)
- 23 October – Helge Røstad, judge (born 1923)
- 23 October – Ivar Refseth, politician (born 1921).
- 23 October – Tobias Gedde-Dahl, physician (born 1903).
- 23 October – Arvid S. Kapelrud, theologian (born 1912).
- 26 October – Tutta Rolf, actress (born 1907, died in the US).
- 29 October – Einar Falck, businessperson (born 1925).
- 29 October – Oscar Midtlyng, athlete (born 1906, died in the US).
- 31 October – Erling Stordahl, singer (born 1923).

=== November ===
- 3 November – Andreas Tømmerbakke, resistance member (born 1910).
- 5 November – Christian Christensen, newspaper editor (born 1922).
- 6 November – Edvard Natvig, athlete (born 1907).
- 7 November – Charles Mathiesen, speed skater (born 1911)
- 7 November – Thor Inge Kristiansen, actor (born 1924).
- 9 November – Erling Christophersen, explorer, botanist and diplomat (born 1898).
- 11 November – Harry Johan Olai Klippenvåg, politician (born 1913)
- 11 November – Jan Johnsen, politician (born 1925).
- 15 November – Asbjørn Lindhjem, politician (born 1910)
- 15 November – Hallvard Magerøy, philologist (born 1916).
- 18 November – Henning Sinding-Larsen, journalist (born 1904).
- 27 November – Toralf Tollefsen, accordionist (born 1914).
- 29 November – Ferdinand Strøm, dentist (born 1903).

=== December ===
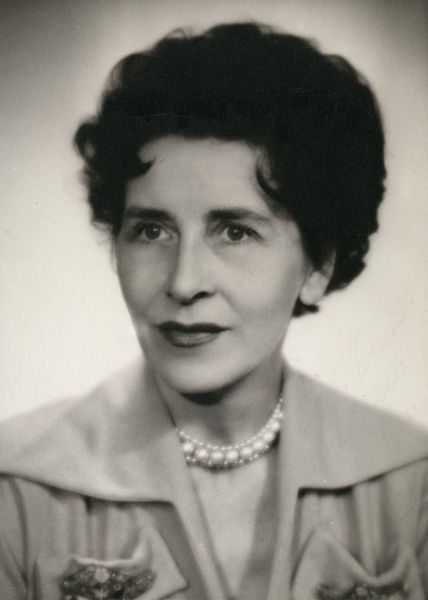
Ella Hval

- 3 December – Knut Mørch Hansson, actor (born 1920).
- 4 December – Beate Mulholland, children's writer (born 1944).
- 6 December – Annette Thommessen, human rights activist (born 1932).
- 9 December – Hans Egil Rønbeck, politician (born 1912).
- 11 December – Magnus Andersen, politician (born 1916)
- 12 December – Sverre Oddvar Andresen, politician (born 1924)
- 12 December – Rolf Gjermundsen, politician (born 1921)
- 12 December – Nanna Münster Ebbing, politician (born 1913).
- 13 December – Georg Hygen, botanist (born 1908).
- 13 December – Erik Jarve, stock exchange executive (born 1944).
- 14 December – Trygve Leivestad, Supreme Court Justice (born 1907).
- 17 December – Ella Hval, actress (born 1914).
- 28 December – Arnljot Norwich, politician (born 1922).
- 30 December – Sverre Lysgaard, sociologist (born 1923).
- 30 December – Kjell Samuelsen, politician (born 1930).
- 31 December – Reidar Helgesen, politician (born 1920).

Date unknown

- Docile, dog belonging to Egil Olsen.
