= Church of Our Saviour, Copenhagen =

Church of Our Saviour
- Vor Frelsers Kirke
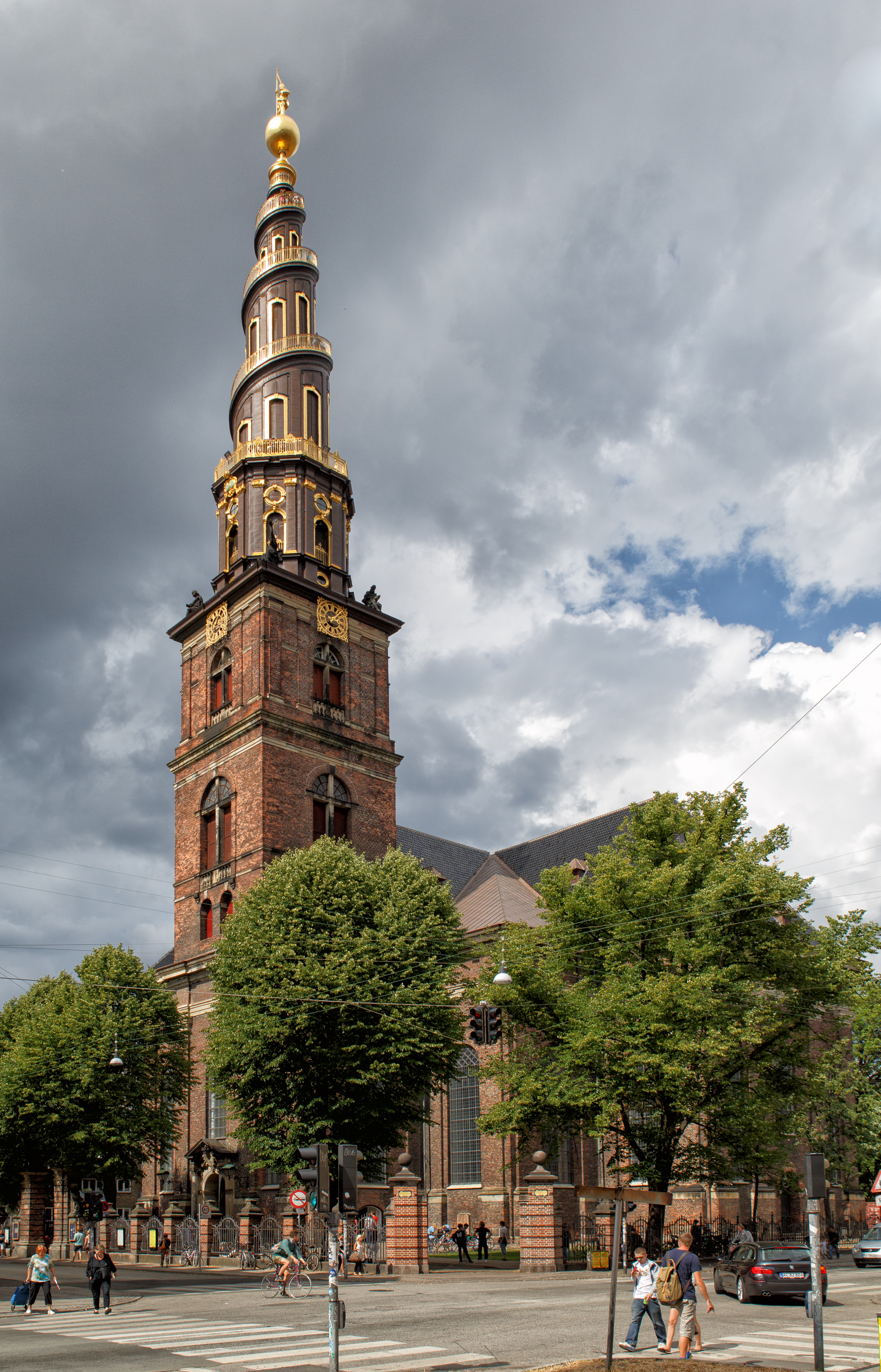
- Church of Our Saviour
- Church of Our Saviour
- 55°40′22″N 12°35′38″E
- Location: 29 Sankt Annæ Gade 29; Christianshavn, Copenhagen
- Country: Denmark
- Denomination: Church of Denmark
- Website: www.vorfrelserskirke.dk (in Danish)

History
- Status: Church
- Consecrated: 1696

Architecture
- Architect(s): Lambert van Haven; Lauritz de Thurah (Spire)
- Architectural type: Church
- Style: Baroque
- Completed: 1696; 1752 (spire)

Specifications
- Height: 90 m (295 ft 3 in)
- Materials: Brick

Administration
- Diocese: Diocese of Copenhagen

Clergy
- Bishop: Peter Skov-Jakobsen
- Rector: Marlene Lindsten
- Vicar(s): Finn Damgaard; Susanne Møller Olsen

The Church of Our Saviour (Danish: Vor Frelsers Kirke; [vɒ ˈfʁælsɐs ˈkiɐ̯kə]) is a baroque church in Copenhagen, Denmark, most famous for the external spiral winding staircase that can be climbed to the top, offering extensive views over central Copenhagen. It is also noted for its carillon, which plays melodies every hour from 8 am to midnight.

== History ==
When Christian IV planned Christianshavn in 1617, it was intended as an independent merchant's town on the island of Amager and it therefore needed a church. A temporary church was inaugurated in 1639 but construction of the present Church of Our Saviour, the design of Lambert van Haven, did not start until 1682. The church was inaugurated 14 years later in 1695 but important interior features like the altar had a notoriously temporary character and the tower still had no spire. The church got its permanent altar in 1732 but plans for construction of the spire was not revitalized until 1747 under the reign of Frederik V. The new architect on the project was Lauritz de Thurah. He soon abandoned van Haven's original design in favour of his own project that was approved by the King in 1749. Three years later the spire was finished and the King climbed the tower at a ceremony on 28 August 1752.

=== Urban legend ===
There is a long-lived urban legend stating that the architect killed himself by jumping from the top of the spire, when he realised that the spiral turns the wrong way - anticlockwise - around. This is not about Lambert van Haven, since the spire was added to the church almost 50 years after his death, but the designer of the spiral spire, Laurids de Thurah. There is no truth in the myth though, since Thurah died in his bed seven years after the spire was completed, and there is nothing in the records that indicates that he should have been unhappy with his work in any way.

== Architecture ==
The church is built in a Dutch baroque style and its basic layout is a Greek cross. The walls rest on a granite foundation and are made of red and yellow tiles but in a random pattern unlike what is seen in Christian IV's buildings where they are generally systematically arranged. The facade is segmented by pilasters in the palladian giant order, that is they continue in the building's entire height. The pilasters are of the Tuscan order with bases and capitals in sandstone. The cornice is also in sandstone but with a frieze in tiles. Between the pilasters are tall round-arched windows with clear glass and iron cames. There are entrances at the gable of the cross arms except for the eastern gable where the sacristy is added. The main entrance is in the western gable below the tower and has a sandstone portal. All entrances are raised four steps from street level. At each side of the tower, there is a gate at street level leading to the two crypts of the church. The roof is vaulted and covered in black-glazed tiles.

=== Tessin's altarpiece ===
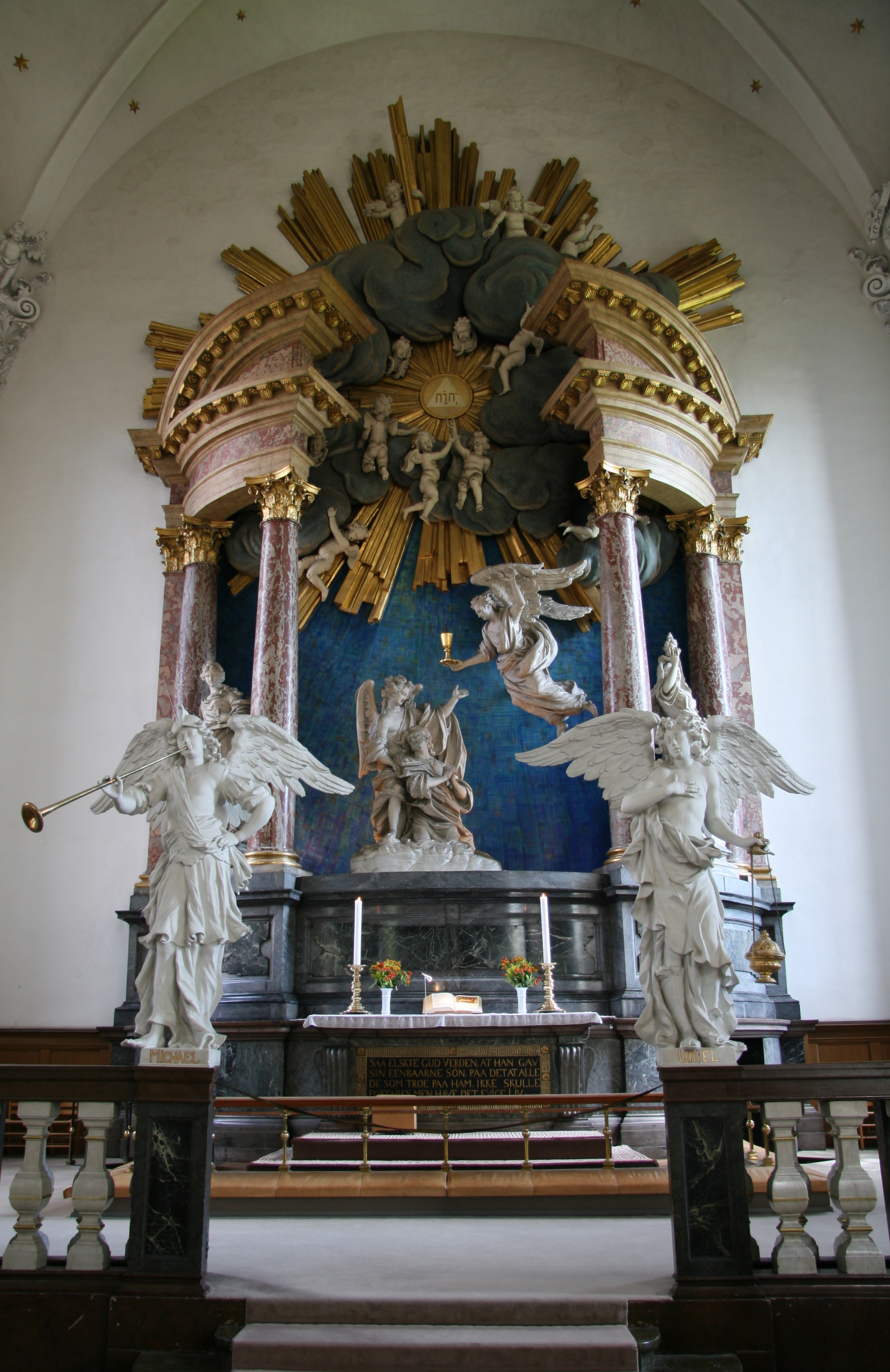
Tessin's altarpiece

The altarpiece is the work of Nicodemus Tessin and depicts a scene from the Garden of Gethsemane between two columns, where Jesus is comforted by an angel while another angel hangs in the air beside them, carrying the golden chalice. On each side, two figures of Pietas and Justitia illustrate the King's motto. The two columns carry a broken, curved architrave and gable. Behind the opening of the broken gable is placed a pane with Jahve's name in Hebrew inscribed and lit from behind. Around the pane is an arrangement of gilded beams and cloud formations.

=== Organ ===
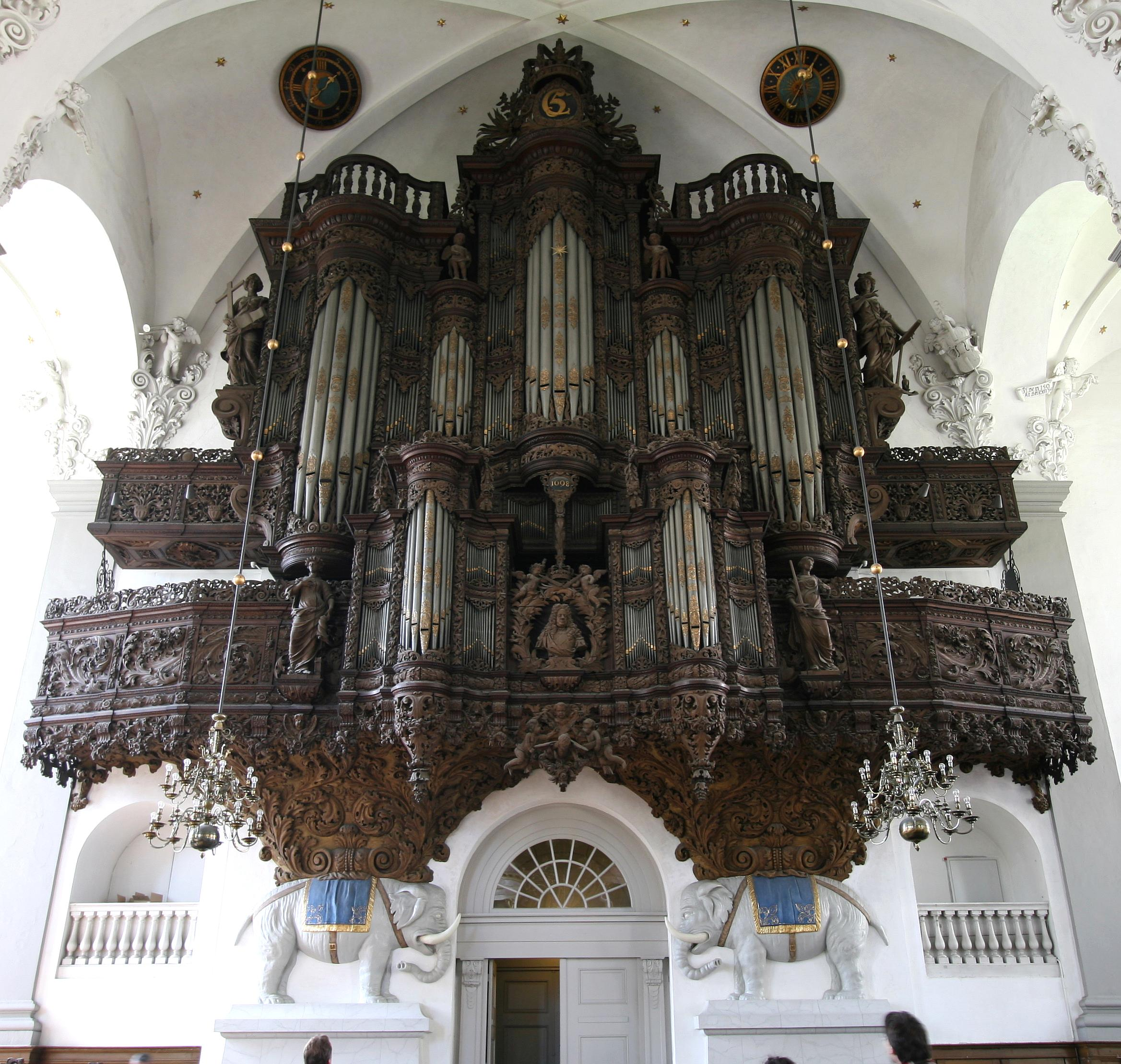
The organ facade

The huge organ with Christian V's gilded monogram was built by the Botzen Brothers from 1698 to 1700 and is mounted on the wall and supported by two elephants. The organ has more than 4000 pipes with the original cymbelstern tinkling in the background during a special part of a music piece, and the entire instrument produces the sound that was heard in the church over 300 years ago. The church arranges 15-20 concerts every year together with musical church services on Sundays. The last rebuilding of the organ was in 1965, reusing older pipe work and this instrument is equipped with 57 stops spread over 4 manuals and pedals. The facade of the organ has intricate wood carvings and a bust of Christian V in the centre.

== Tower ==
The tower is raised three stories above the western cross arm. The levels are marked by sandstone cornices that become larger with height, and there are round-arched openings on all four sides at each level. The top level is decorated with flat pilasters and from the uppermost cornice has a gilded penetrated clock face centrally on each side. The hands are connected to a clockwork inside the tower.

=== Spire ===
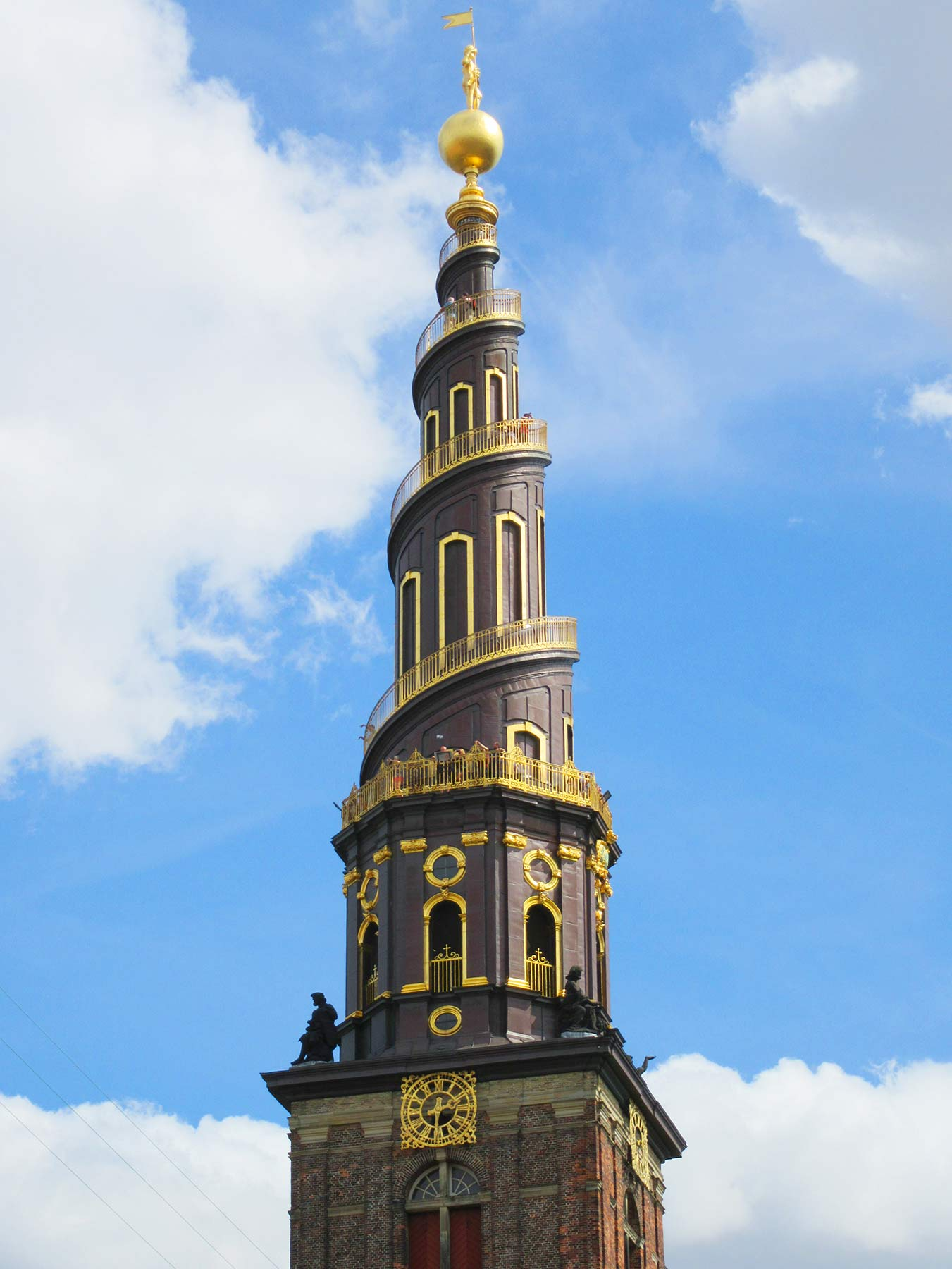
Thurah's corkscrew spire

The black and golden spire reaches a height of 90 metres and the external staircase turns four times counterclockwise around it. Inspiration for the design came from the spiral lantern of Sant'Ivo alla Sapienza, which turns the same way around.

It is built as a timber-framed structure, octagonal at its base, with round-arched openings and round windows with gilded frames. The windows are flanked by gilded pilasters in the composite order. Around the octagonal base of the spire on the four corners of the square tower, stand four statues of the four evangelists. The octagonal structure is topped by a small platform with a gilded railing and it is from this point that the staircase become external. There is a total number of 400 steps to the top of the spire, the last 150 being outside.

The spire is topped by a vase-like structure, carrying a gilded globe with a 4-meter-tall figure of Christ Triumphant carrying a banner. It has an infamous reputation for being the ugliest sculpture in Copenhagen but is intentionally made with exaggerated proportions because it is only meant to be seen from long distances.

=== Views ===
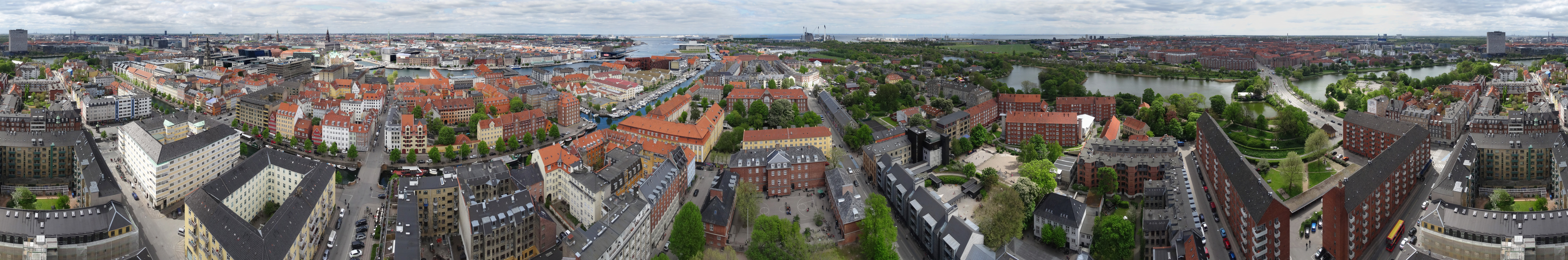
360°-panorama from the top.
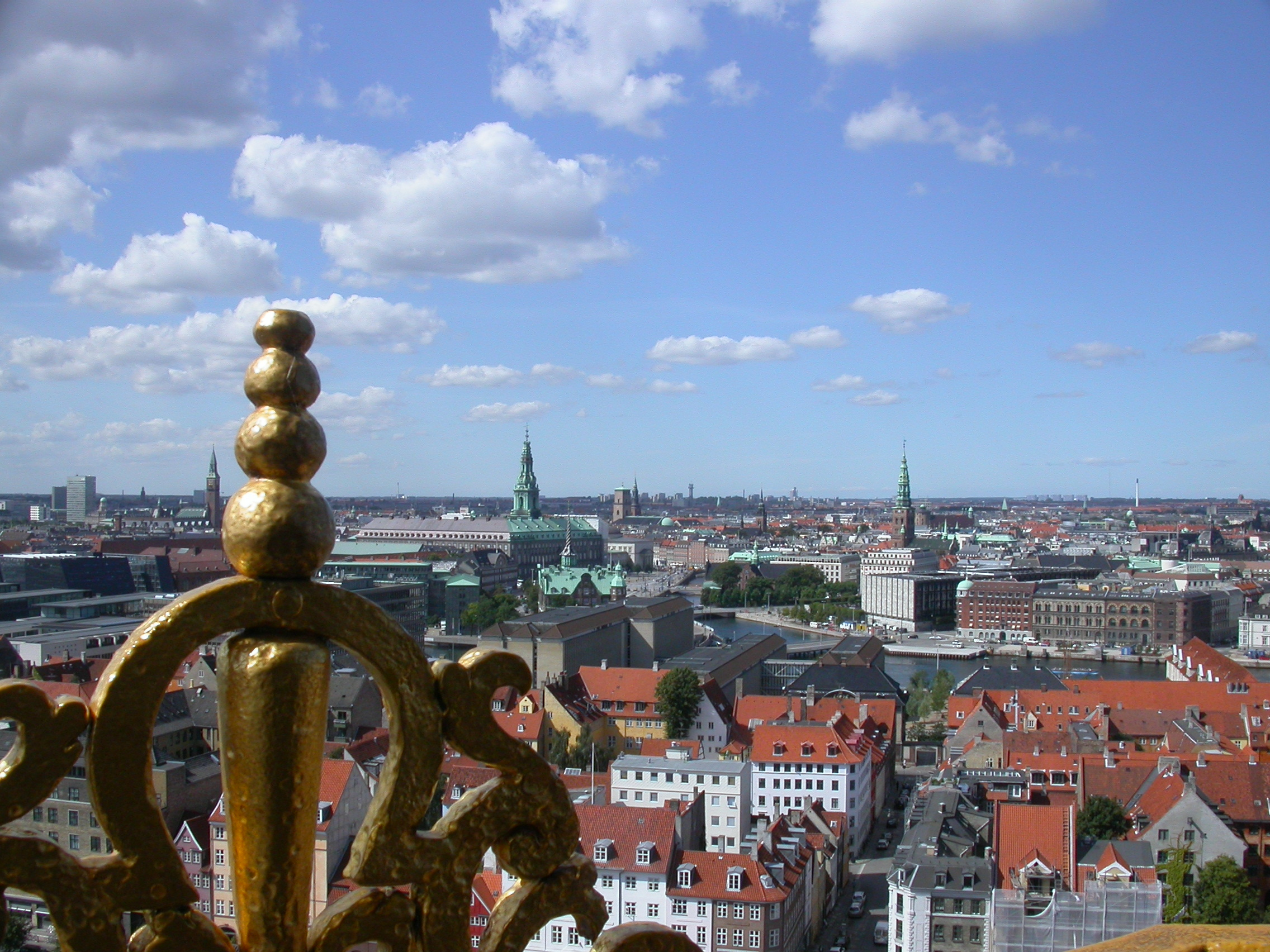
View towards Christiansborg and the National Bank

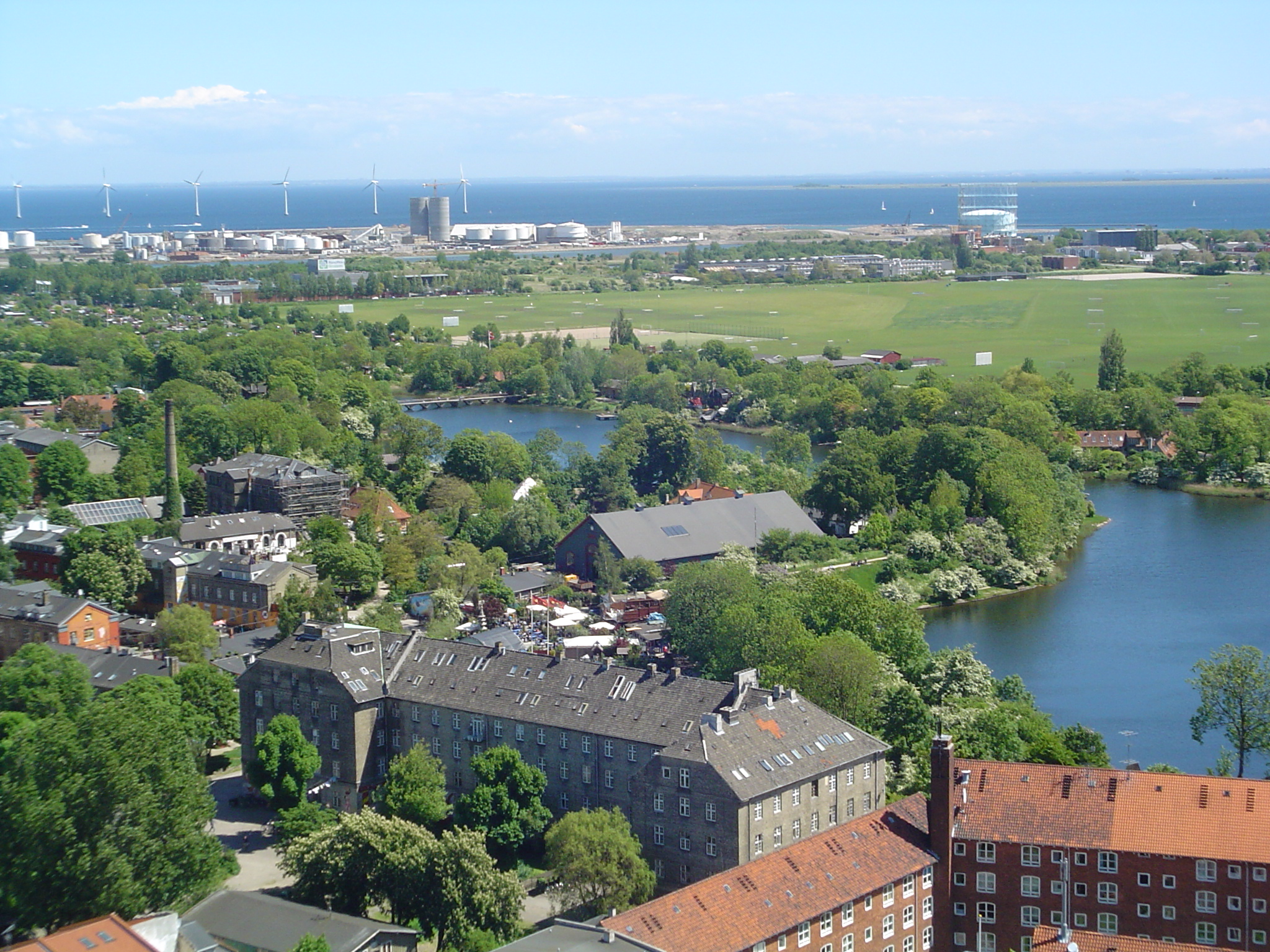
View towards Kløvermarken and Amager

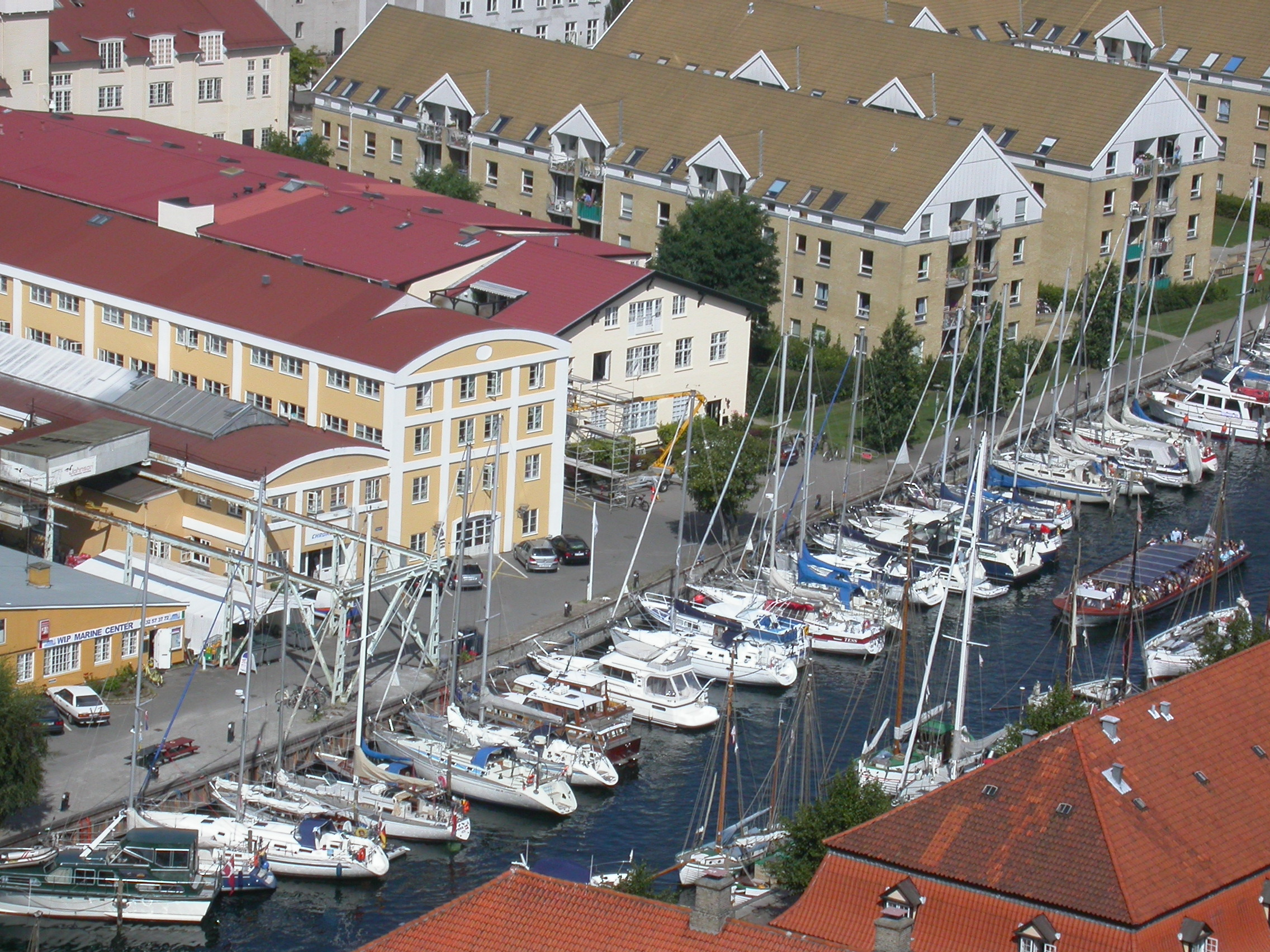
View of Christianshavn Canal and Wilders Plads

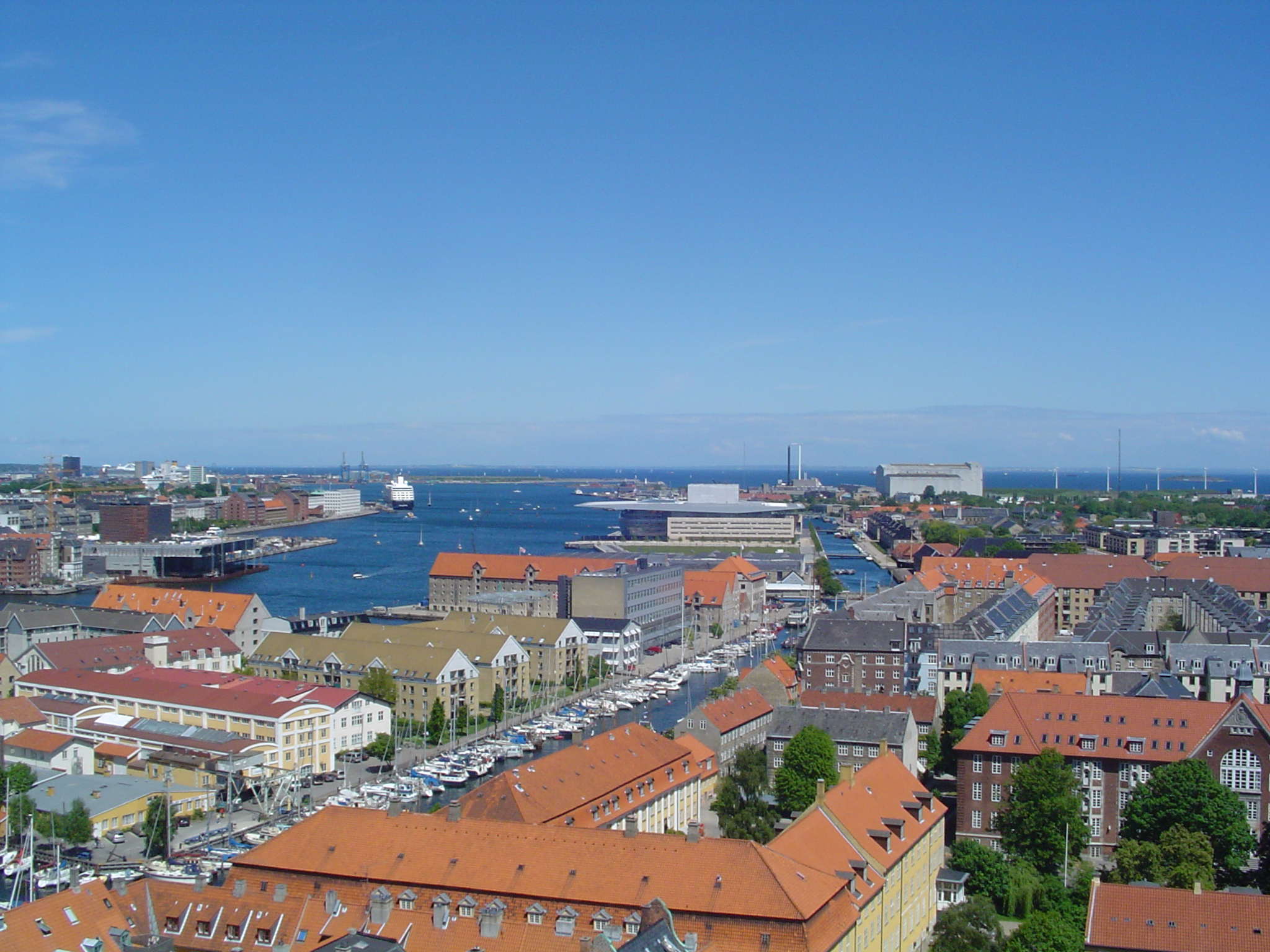
The entrance to Copenhagen Harbour

=== Carillon ===
The tower of the church is equipped with a concert carillon from 1928 that was rebuilt in 1980 and consists of 48 bronze carillon bells that have a musical range of four octaves, making it the largest carillon in Northern Europe. The largest bells weigh over 2,000 kilograms and the smallest 10 kilograms. In total, the carillon weighs almost 12 tonnes, and chimes every hour over Christianshavn with different hymn compositions. The church established the first full-time carillon performance position in Denmark in 1983, and carillonneur Ulla Laage held the position until 2006.

== Grounds ==
The grounds of the church are surrounded by a fence and contains the remains of the church's graveyard. The current of Our Saviour's Cemetery is located at the corner of Amagerbrogade and Prags Boulevard on Amager, It was inaugurated in 1790.

=== Burials ===
Burials at the church include:

- Andreas Bjørn (1703–1750), merchant, shipowner and ship builder
- Otto Fabricius (1744–1822), missionary, naturalist, ethnographer and explorer
- Frederik Holmsted (1683–1758), merchant and mayor of Copenhagen
- Carl Viborg (1783–1844), veterinarian

== Cultural connections ==
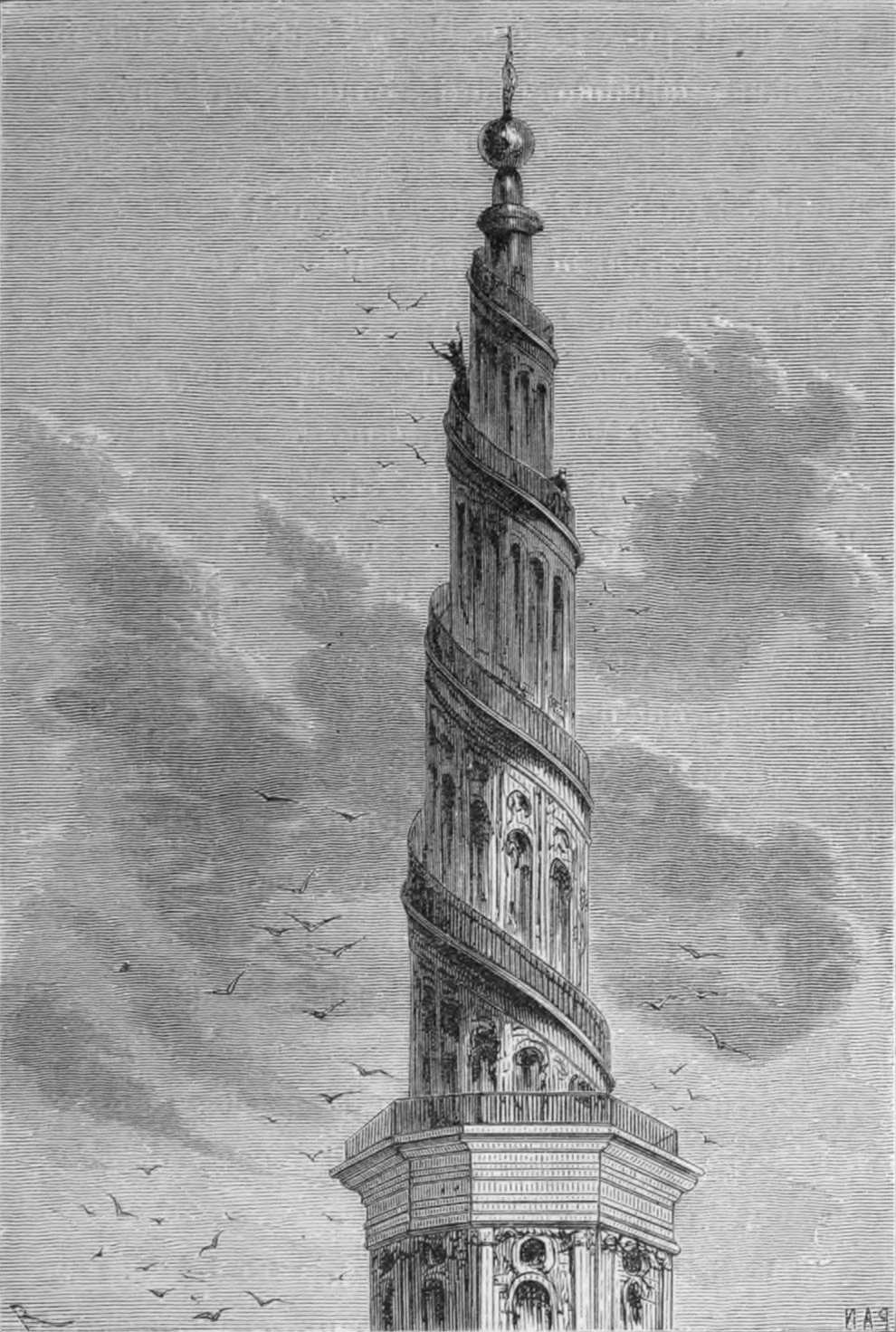
The spire of the church by Édouard Riou, for A Journey to the Center of the Earth

The Church of Our Saviour in Christianshavn appears in a chapter of Jules Verne's A Journey to the Center of the Earth. The character Axel is made to climb the winding spire for five consecutive days by his uncle to cure him of his acrophobia before their descent into the volcano.

The French painter and illustrator Édouard Riou has depicted the church in the original French illustrated version of A Journey to the Center of the Earth, but has the spire turned the wrong way around, that is, clockwise instead of counterclockwise.

== Image gallery ==
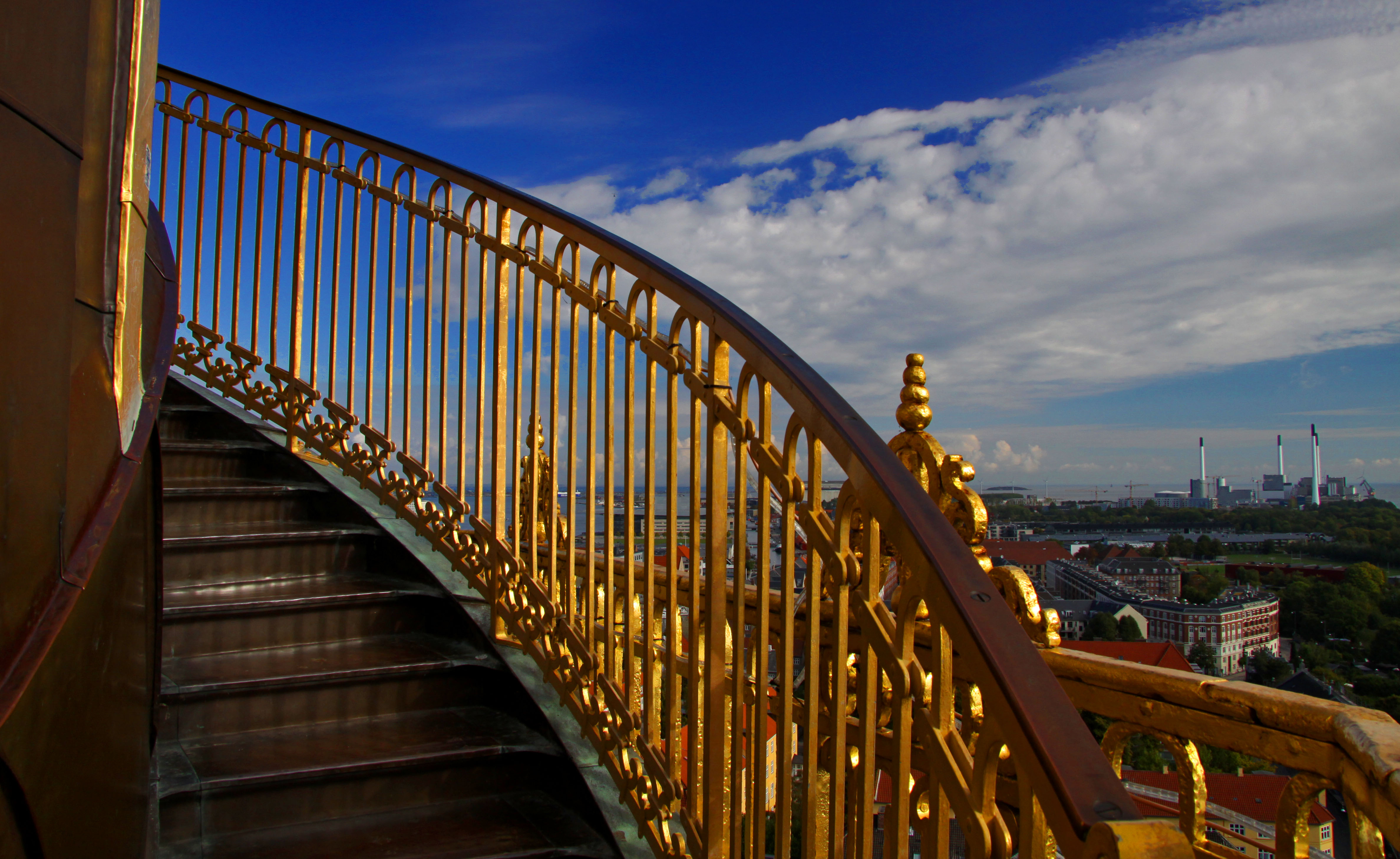
The spiral staircase narrowing

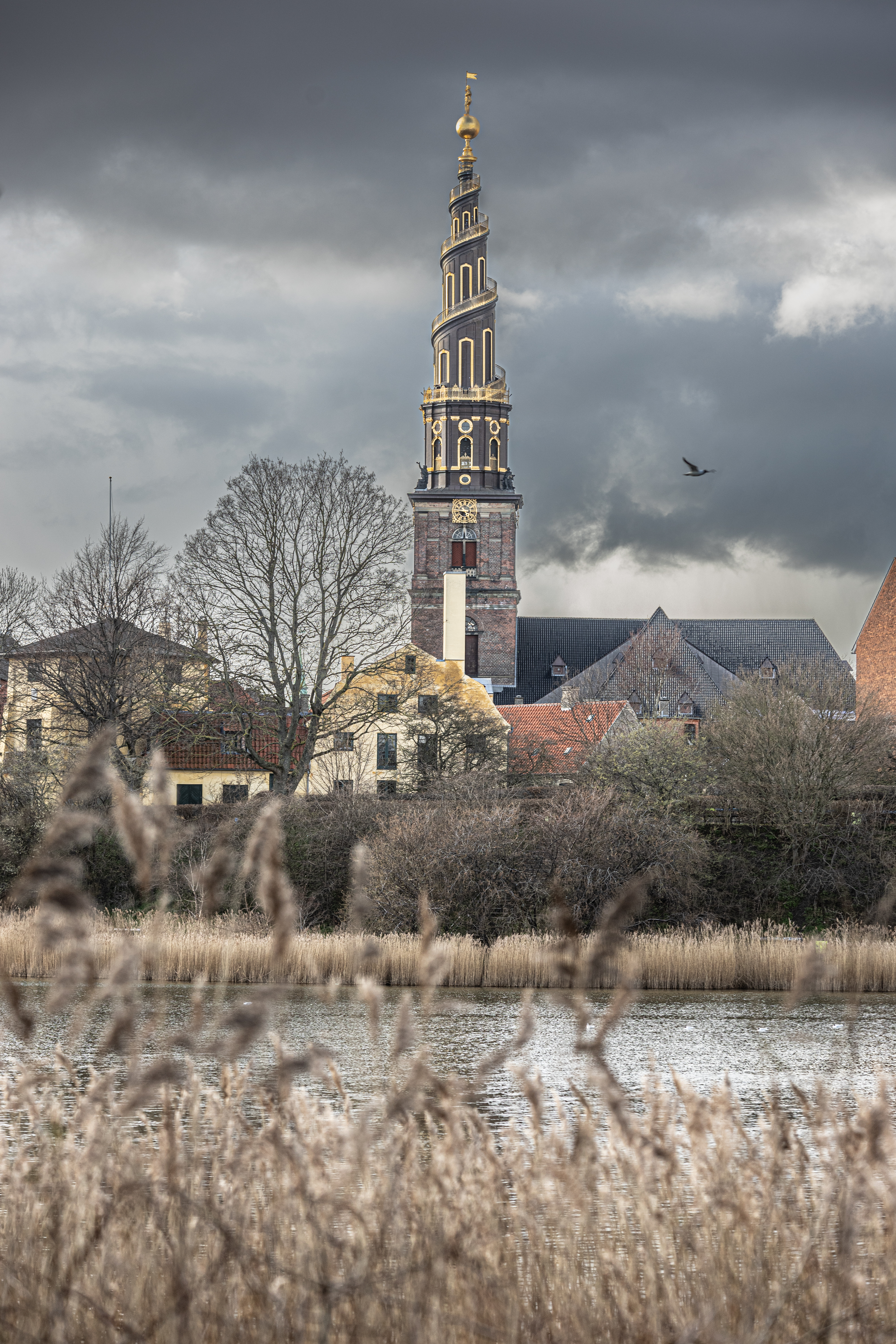
The Church of Our Saviour .View from Christianshavns Vold.
