= Ulla Laage =

Danish carillonneur (born 1949)

- Born: 10 July 1949 (age 76)
- Education: Royal Danish Academy of Music; Scandinavian Carillon School
- Occupations: Carillonneur; composer
- Years active: 1970s–present

Ulla Laage (born 10 July 1949) is a Danish carillonneur and composer. She was the first carillonneur to hold a full-time carillon performance position in Denmark, and one of a small number of women to hold a professional carillon post in Europe during the twentieth century.

== Early life and education ==
Laage was born in 1949 to architect Vagn Laage and artist Aase Laage. She earned a diploma in organ performance from the Royal Danish Academy of Music studying with Aksel Andersen, who advocated for the establishment of a Scandinavian Carillon School. She pursued carillon study through masterclasses and workshops and earned the first diploma awarded by the new Scandinavian Carillon School in Løgumkloster in 1982. Laage studied intensively in 1986 and 1988 with noted American carillonneur Milford Myhre at Bok Tower Gardens in Lake Wales, Florida. In 1989, she earned the advanced Artist Diploma from the Scandinavian Carillon School.

== Career ==
Laage became carillonneur of the Church of Our Saviour, Copenhagen, in 1974 and held that position until 2006. In 1983, her position was expanded into the first full-time carillon performance job in the country. After her departure in 2006, the position was reduced to a part-time responsibility of the organist, the predominant arrangement in Denmark. From 1993 through 2000, she adjudicated carillonneur exams for the Minister for Ecclesiastical Affairs (Denmark).

Her concert career took her throughout Europe and the United States of America, where she performed on both tower carillons and mobile carillons. She was featured at the first international carillon festival at Bok Tower Gardens in 1986 and again at the 1999 festival. She performed at the first international carillon festival in West Berlin in 1988, later returning at the invitation of the Berliner Festspiele to perform on the Olsen Nauen Bell Foundry's mobile carillon before the Abgeordnetenhaus of Berlin at midnight on 2–3 October 1990 for the official reunification of Germany. She performed at the 1990 World Carillon Federation congress in Zutphen, Netherlands. In 1994, she performed on the mobile carillon in Tønsberg, Norway, for the 1994 Winter Olympics torch relay.

Laage performed inaugural recitals for two carillons: at the Church of the Holy Ghost, Copenhagen in 1993 and at Frederiksborg Castle in Hillerød in 2005. She consulted on the design of both instruments.

As a composer, Laage is noted for her hymn setting Free variations on "Built on a rock the Church doth stand" (2000). In 2015, she was commissioned by the Yale University Guild of Carillonneurs to compose Billede, which was premiered at the 2016 Congress of The Guild of Carillonneurs in North America.

== Discography ==
- The Time of Bells 4: Soundscapes of Italy, Denmark, Finland, Japan, and Iraq/USA (2006), VoxLox, an album of field recordings by Steven Feld
- Vor Frelsers Kirke (1991), Helikon, with organist Jens E. Christensen

== Publications ==
- Billede (MCMLXVI – MMXVI) (2016), musical score published by the Yale University Guild of Carillonneurs
- Free variations on "Built on a rock the Church doth stand" (2000), musical score published by The Guild of Carillonneurs in North America
- Himmelstigen: En Dramatisk Dokumentarfilm om et Barokspir og en Stædig Arkitekt (1997), documentary film by Nils Vest
- Gnossienne no. III by Erik Satie (1991), solo carillon arrangement
- Tortues: From "Le Carnaval des Animaux" (1990) by Camille Saint-Saëns, solo carillon arrangement published by the Dansk Klokkespiller Laug
- L'éléphant: From "Le carnaval des animaux" (1990) by Camille Saint-Saëns, duet carillon arrangement published by the Dansk Klokkespiller Laug
- Trumpet Tune (1982) by Henry Purcell, solo carillon arrangement published by the Dansk Klokkespiller Laug
- Allegretto (1980) by Giovanni Battista Pergolesi, solo carillon arrangement published by the Dansk Klokkespiller Laug
