= Hamnes =

Hamnes is a Norwegian surname. Notable people with the surname include:

- Andreas Hamnes (born 1941), Norwegian politician for the Labour Party
- Stein Hamnes (1940–1994), Norwegian politician for the Labour Party
- Geir Hamnes (born 1954), organizer of the "Miss Norway" competition from 1986
