= Beharie (singer) =

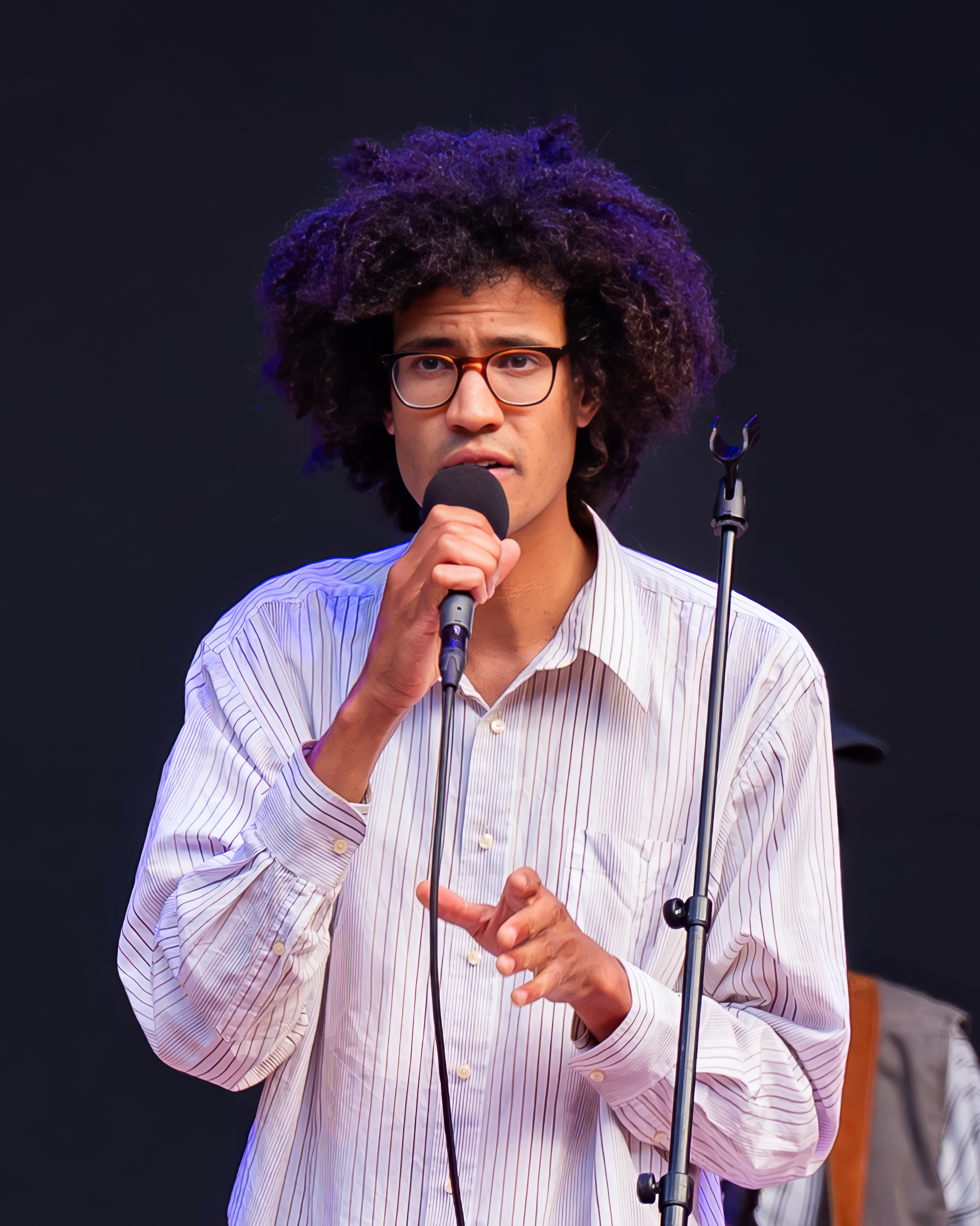
- At the Ravnedalen Live open air festival in Norway, 2023

Background information
- Born: Christian Roger Beharie; April 22, 1994 (age 32); Sandnes, Norway
- Origin: Sandnes, Norway
- Genres: Soul, R&B
- Occupation: Singer-songwriter
- Years active: 2018–present
- Labels: Compro Records, V2 Recordings
- Website: www.beharieofficial.com

Christian Roger Beharie (born 22 April 1994), known professionally as Beharie, is a Norwegian soul/RnB singer/songwriter from Sandnes.

From 2010 to 2013, Beharie studied at Vågen High School in Sandnes, Norway. He graduated as a performing musician from Staffeldtsgate NLA College. He released his first EP, Beharie, in 2019 and its follow-up, Beharie // Beharie in 2021. He won the Spellemannprisen 2021 for the EP Beharie // Beharie in the class RnB/soul. He was also nominated for the Edvardprisen in 2022 in the Popular category, for the EP Beharie // Beharie.

He released his third EP, Bhearie, the Third, in 2022, and was nominated for the Spellemannprisen 2022 in the RnB/soul category for this.

In October 2023, he released his debut album Are You There, Boy?. That year he was nominated for the Bendiksen Award, and the Spellemannprisen 2023 in the RnB/Soul category.

He contributed to the song "River" by Thomas Dybdahl from the album Fever in 2020. In 2018 and 2019 he played in the Norwegian Theatre production of The Book of Mormon.

== Discography ==
- Beharie (2019, Compro Records) - EP
- Beharie // Beharie (2021, Compro Records) - EP
- Beharie, the Third (2022, V2 Recordings) - EP
- Are You There, Boy? (2023, V2 Recordings) - album
