= Gimlekollen NLA College =

Educational institution in Kristiansand, Norway

Coordinates: 58°10′27.83″N 08°01′23.86″E

- NLA Mediehøgskolen Gimlekollen
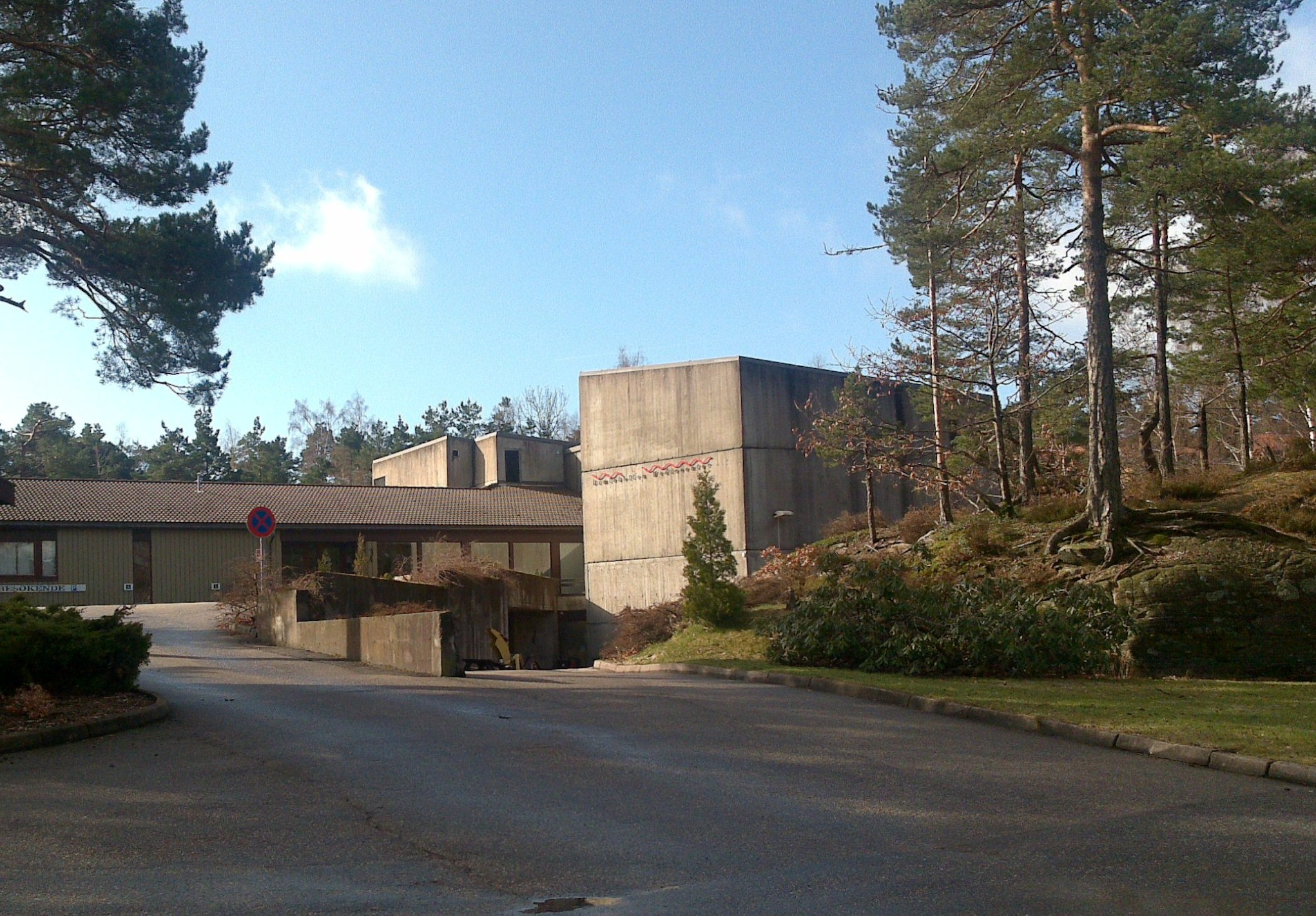
- Gimlekollen NLA College
- Type: Private branch institution
- Established: 1981; 45 years ago
- Parent institution: NLA University College
- Students: 200
- Location: Gimlekollen, Kristiansand, Norway

Gimlekollen NLA College (Norwegian: NLA Mediehøgskolen Gimlekollen) is a private branch institution of NLA University College located in Gimlekollen in Kristiansand, Norway. It focuses on journalism, media, and communication. The school was established in 1981, became a college in 1996, and was affiliated with NLA University College on January 1, 2013. NLA University College is owned by six Christian organizations and a church community, and it is based on Christian values. The college is accredited by the Norwegian Agency for Quality Assurance in Education and is open to anyone regardless of life orientation.

The institution offers a bachelor's degrees in journalism, IT and communications, intercultural communication, and communication and life orientation, as well as an English-language master's degree in global journalism. The institution, which has about 200 students, educates 10 to 20% of all journalists in Norway. NLA University College also operates the company Damaris Norge through a special framework; it is primarily associated with communication and philosophy of life. Damaris Norge is also located in Gimlekollen in Kristiansand.

The college is part of the Gimlekollen Media Center, which also includes the production companies Sanden Media and Norea Mediemisjon.

== Chancellors ==
- Asbjørn Kvalbein, 1981–1990
- Geir Sandvik, 1990–1996
- Knut Sigurd Aasebø, 1996–2002
- Hans Aage Gravaas, 2002–2008
- Lars Dahle, 2008–2012
- Since 2013 the institution has had no chancellor, but Lars Dahle has served as deputy chancellor (site manager).
