= NLA University College =

- NLA Høgskolen
- Motto: – fordi noen trenger deg
- Motto in English: – because someone needs you
- Established: 1968; 58 years ago
- Religious affiliation: Christianity
- Rector: Sigbjørn Sødal
- Total staff: 300
- Students: 3,331
- Location: Bergen, Oslo, Kristiansand, Stavanger, Trondheim,, Norway
- Colors
- Website: www.nla.no

NLA University College (Norwegian: NLA Høgskolen) is a private Norwegian Christian college accredited by the Norwegian Agency for Quality Assurance in Education. The university college has about 3,300 students and 300 employees distributed across four campuses in three cities, two in Bergen, one in Sandviken and the other in Kalfaret, Gimlekollen NLA College in Kristiansand, and Staffeldtsgate NLA College in Oslo. The university college also offers studies at two satellite campuses, one in Trondheim and the other in Stavanger. NLA University College acquired its institutions in Oslo and Kristiansand after the colleges there merged with NLA University College on January 1, 2013. NLA University College is the only private college in Norway offering primary school teacher education.

NLA University College offers five‑year integrated master’s programmes in primary and lower secondary teacher education, and three‑year bachelor’s programmes in early childhood teacher education in both Bergen and Oslo. In Bergen, the university college also offers bachelor’s degrees in pedagogy, as well as session‑based master’s programmes in early childhood education, pedagogy, special needs education and educational leadership.

In Bergen, students can take a master’s degree in theology, a professional degree programme qualifying candidates for ordination in the Church of Norway, and an English‑language master’s degree in theology and ministry. Bachelor’s degrees in theology are offered in Bergen, Oslo, Kristiansand and Trondheim, each with its own academic profile.

Under the name Hauge School of Management (HSM), NLA University College offers bachelor’s programmes in economics in Oslo, Bergen, Kristiansand and Stavanger. From 2026, HSM also offer a master’s degree in responsible innovation and entrepreneurship in Oslo. Hauge School of Management is named after Hans Nielsen Hauge.

NLA University College in Oslo (Staffeldts) offers a master’s degree in contemporary music performance, as well as bachelor’s degrees in contemporary music performance and in music creation, including songwriting, production and live performance. A four‑year bachelor pathway is also offered for students training to become contemporary church musicians, leading to bachelor’s degrees both in music, ministry and leadership, and in contemporary music performance.

Intercultural studies are offered as bachelor’s programmes in Bergen, Kristiansand and as an online programme, in addition to an master’s degree in Bergen. In Kristiansand, the university college also offers bachelor’s degrees in journalism and content production, as well as an English‑language master’s degree in global journalism.

In addition to degree‑awarding programmes, NLA University College offers one‑year study programmes, formal continuing education and online courses at bachelor level across all subject areas. The university college also offers courses in economics and management specifically designed for Ukrainian refugees, with Ukrainian as the language of instruction. For international exchange students, eight different bachelor‑level semester programmes are available, all taught in English.

In 2025, NLA University College applied for accreditation of a PhD programme in social responsibility and formation.

== History ==
Norsk Lærerakademi («Norwegian Teacher Academy») began in Bergen with studies in christianity in September 1968 and expanded with studies in pedagogy from 1977. The institution was accredited as a university college in 2006. In 1995, NLA Lærerhøgskolen («NLA School of Education») was established as an independent unit offering teacher education at Breistein in Bergen. In 2010, the two colleges merged to form NLA University College, and in 2013 NLA University College merged with the College of Staffeldtsgate in Oslo and Gimlekollen College of Journalism and Communication in Kristiansand. In the autumn of 2013, Hauge School of Management was established as values‑based programme in economics and management.

In 2024, NLA University College established a regional study centre in Trondheim offering bachelor’s programmes in theology and practical theology. In 2025, Hauge School of Management expanded its operations with a regional study centre in Stavanger as its fourth location, offering bachelor’s degrees in economics and management.

== Management and ownership ==
The college is run by a board elected by its general meeting. NLA University College is owned by the following Christian organizations:

- Normisjon
- The Norwegian Missionary Society
- The Inner Mission Association
- The Norwegian Christian Student and School Association
- The Norwegian Lutheran Mission
- Norwegian Sunday Schools
- The Evangelical Lutheran Free Church of Norway
