= Jan-Erik Aarberg =

Norwegian sailor

Personal information
- Nationality: Norwegian
- Born: 29 October 1924; Oslo, Norway
- Died: 26 June 1994 (aged 69); Asker, Norway

Sport
- Sport: Sailing

Jan-Erik Aarberg (29 October 1924 – 26 June 1994) was a Norwegian sailor and engineer by trade. He was born in Oslo. He competed at the 1972 Summer Olympics in Munich.
