= Docile =

Norwegian dog

- Species: Dog
- Breed: Briard
- Sex: Female
- Born: c. 1989
- Died: 1994 (aged 4–5)
- Owner: Egil Olsen

Docile (c. 1989 – 1994) was a female Briard dog. Owned by football manager Egil Olsen, the dog became a national celebrity animal during Olsen's tenure as manager of the Norway national football team.

The dog quickly became known for accompanying Olsen to work, both in the Football Association offices and in training sessions. In addition, the Briard breed was rare in Norway, with approximately 300 individuals. According to a biographer of Egil Olsen, Docile was used as a figurehead to shield his family members from media attention. Another reason that Olsen kept a dog was to walk the dog to ailment his ankylosing spondylitis.

The media attention around the Norwegian men's national football team increased significantly during the 1994 FIFA World Cup qualification run, which was the first successful qualification for Norway since the late 1930s. As training sessions were crowded with journalists, in early 1994 VG's Bjørn Delebekk won the Norwegian Press Photographers' annual prize for sports photography. His photoseries of Docile frolicking around the national team players was titled "En hund etter ball".

During the 1994 World Cup, Docile did not follow Olsen to the US and was stationed at Olsen's in-laws in Egersund. They claimed that the dog was recognised around town. The same period saw several spin-off products inspired by the dog. A woolwear factory started marketing a "World Cup yarn" under the name Docile. The pub Docile in Hamar acquired Olsen's acceptance to use Docile's name and likeness, both on the pub itself and on caps and clothing. The newspaper Dagbladet arranged a letter column in Docile's name during the 1994 World Cup. People would contact Docile's supposed fax machine number and have the chance to win a book by Tor Røste Fossen. The same newspaper arranged a naming contest for Olsen's next dog, which would be of the same breed.

In early November 1994, Docile escaped from the front yard of Olsen's home. As some boys played in the street outside, the dog bit the pant leg of one of the boys, causing minor clothing damage. Reportedly against the wishes of the boy's parents, the decision was made to euthanize the dog. Docile was regarded as a national celebrity and "Norway's most publicized dog". Norway's largest newspaper VG stated that Olsen's unusual choice of footwear, Wellington boots, coupled with Docile resting at his feet was "A sort of trademark for the most Norwegian of all Norwegian things".

== See also ==
- List of individual dogs
