= Staffeldtsgate NLA College =

Private college in Oslo, Norway

Coordinates: 59.9193°N 10.7320°E

Staffeldtsgate NLA College (Norwegian: NLA Høgskolen Staffeldtsgate) is a private college of NLA University College's division in Oslo, Norway. At the campus, which is located near the Royal Palace, the college offers bachelor degrees in economics, administration, and innovation under the name Hauge School of Management, as well as bachelor's degrees and one-year programs in music performance and theology and management. The school became a college on August 1, 2004 and it merged with NLA University College on January 1, 2013.

The school is a continuation of the Oslo Bible School (Norwegian: Bibelskolen i Oslo), which was started by the Norwegian Lutheran Inner Mission Society in 1916.
