= Per Gulowsen =

Norwegian diplomat (1920–1994)

Per Gulowsen (28 January 1920 – 4 February 1994) was a Norwegian diplomat.

He graduated from the Norwegian School of Economics in 1943, and spent the rest of the war years in Sweden and the United Kingdom. He was hired in the Ministry of Foreign Affairs in 1945. He was an attaché at the Norwegian embassy in the Soviet Union for two years, then an embassy secretary in France and legation secretary in West Germany before returning to Norway to serve as an assistant secretary in the Ministry of Foreign Affairs. He was an embassy counsellor in the Soviet Union, then from 1962 a press attaché in Sweden, chargé d'affaires in and embassy manager in Greece from 1967 to 1972 and sub-director in the Ministry of Foreign Affairs from 1972 to 1977.

From 1977 he was Norway's ambassador to India, also with ambassador tasks in Nepal, Bangladesh and Sri Lanka. His last posting was as Norway's ambassador to Turkey, until his retirement.
