= Maria Navarro Skaranger =

Norwegian writer (born 1994)

Maria Navarro Skaranger (born 1994) is a Norwegian writer.

== Biography ==
Skaranger was born in Oslo and studied at the Academy of Creative Writing in Hordaland and at the University of Oslo.

== Books ==
She is the author of novels that have won prizes and been translated into several languages:

- All the Foreigners Have Closed Curtains (2015), which won the First Novel Prize and has been made into a film
- Book of Grief (The Story of Nils in the Woods) (2018), which won the Oslo Prize and the EU Prize for Literature
- Emily Forever (2021)
- Whistling in the Dark Wind (2023)
