= Our Saviour's Cemetery, Copenhagen =

Cemetery in Copenhagen, Denmark

Our Saviour's Cemetery
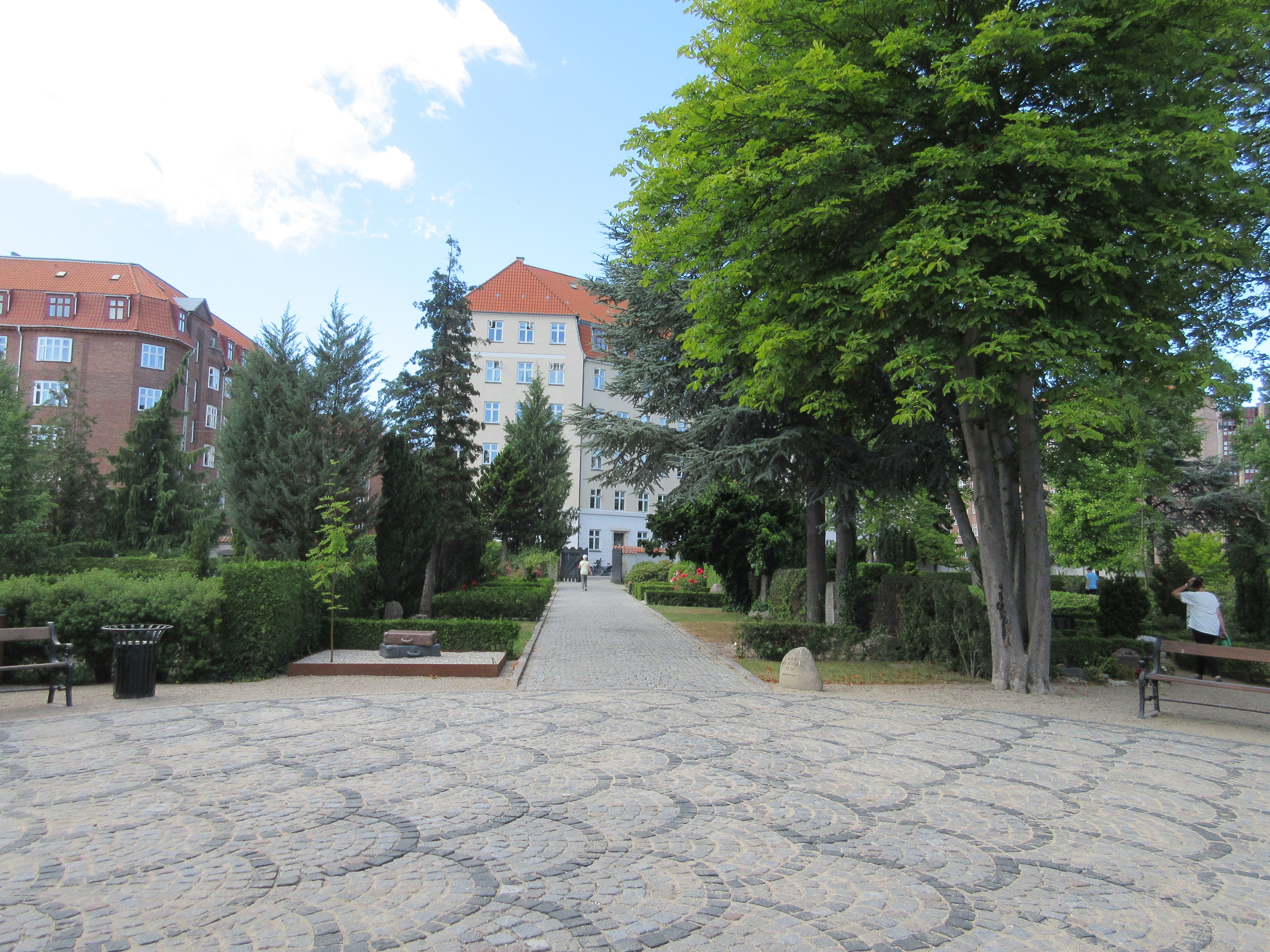
- View from the centre of the cemetery, looking north
- Interactive map of Our Saviour's Cemetery

Details
- Established: 1790
- Location: Copenhagen
- Country: Denmark
- Coordinates: 55°39′54″N 12°36′3″E
- Size: ?
- Website: Official website
- Find a Grave: Our Saviour's Cemetery

Our Saviour's Cemetery (Danish: Vor Frelsers Kirkegård) is located at the corner of Amagerbrogade and Prags Boulevard in Copenhagen, Denmark.

== History ==
Our Saviour's Church was originally surrounded by a graveyard.

The current Our Saviour's Cemetery was established in 1790 since the existing cemeteries in Christianshavn were no longer able to cope with the number of burials. In 1853, as a consequence of the 1853 Copenhagen Cholera Outbreak, all inner city burials were prohibited.

== Design ==
The brick wall that surrounds the cemetery dates from 1927. A new administration building was inaugurated in 2011. The cemetery was refurbished in 2015. A cobbled area surrounded by benches was established in the centre of the cemetery where its two principal avenues cross each other.

== Burials ==
- Ole Brask (1935–2009), photographer
- Edel Bærskog (1920–2015), painter
- Ole Dixon (1935–1975), jazz musician
- Else Frölich (1880–1960), film actress,
- Jørgen Kiil, film actor
- Jesper Klein (1944–2001), actor and entertainer
- Henry Lohmann (1924–1967), actor
- Lykke Nielsen (1946–2001), film actress
- Svend Pri (1946–1983), badminton player
- Henrik Sandberg (1919–1993), film producer
- Christian Wilhelm Schultz-Lorentzen
- Gunnar Strømvad (1908–1972), actor
- Paul Valjean (1935–1992), poet, choreographer and musician
- Eva-Maria Wiehe (1919–2012), illustrator
