= Rolf Greger Strøm =

Norwegian luger (1940–1994)

Rolf Greger Strøm (17 May 1940 – 4 August 1994) was a Norwegian luger. He participated at the 1964 Winter Olympics in Innsbruck, where he placed fourth in the men's singles, and competed at the 1968 Winter Olympics.
