= Helga Jensine Waabenø =

Helga Jensine Waabenø (traditional Chinese: 吳平和; simplified Chinese: 吴平和; pinyin: Wú Pínghé; 22 April 1908 – 25 June 1994) was a Norwegian nurse and Lutheran missionary affiliated with the Norwegian Missionary Society in China. She worked as a missionary in Yiyang in the province of Hunan from 1946 to 1949, and fled to Taiwan where she continued her missionary work. She arrived in Taiwan on 23 December 1949, becoming the first missionary from the Norwegian Missionary Society on the island. She worked there until Christmas 1951 and returned to Norway via the United States after the new year of 1952. She was born in Skjørn Municipality.

After Chinese Communist Party forces under Mao Zedong won in the Chinese Civil War, all foreign missionaries had to evacuate from mainland China. Among these was Waabenø who in 1949 was evacuated from Hunan, to Hong Kong. Later in the autumn of the same year she was contacted by physician Kristoffer Fotland working for the Norwegian Mission Alliance in Taiwan (then called Formosa). She believed that there was a great need for missionaries to work among the large group of Mandarin-speaking refugees from mainland China. Waabenø was interested in this, and on 17 November 1949 consulted with the Norwegian Missionary Society committee of her plan. She obtained permission to work at a large Mission hospital in Taipei, which is now known as the Mackay Memorial Hospital.

Helga Waabenø arrived in Taiwan 23 December 1949 and began work at the hospital in late January 1950. Her first report from Taiwan was printed in the Norwegian Missionary Journal in early 1950, in which she said the following:

I find a lot of work and I am not bored. My main duty was to manage and resolve problems within the hospital departments here. However, I have also been very busy with evangelical work.

Besides working at the Mackay Memorial Hospital she also worked among the Mandarin-speaking refugees from the mainland. These had mainly settled in areas that Chiang Kai-shek's government had outlined for them. She and other missionaries met Christians from the Chinese provinces, who had previously worked on the mainland, also working among these refugees. Waabenø started an English language Bible class in Taipei in the summer of 1951. One of the students were Andrew Liang, and several friends of his started Bible study sessions there too. Liang was the son of one of the Hunan Lutheran priests.

On 1 July 1994 Waabenø was buried in Western Cemetery in Oslo.

== Sources ==
- Steensland, Gustav, "Taiwan" (p. 296-324) in Volume 2 of "In faith and service - the Norwegian Missionary Society 1842-1992 ', Torstein Jørgensen (ed.), Mission College, Stavanger, 1992.
