= 1994 Winter Olympics torch relay =

- Host city: Lillehammer, Norway
- Countries visited: Greece, Germany, Finland, Sweden, Norway
- Distance: 18,000 kilometres (11,000 mi)
- Torchbearers: 6,916
- Start date: November 27, 1993
- End date: February 12, 1994
- Torch designer: André Marandon and Paal Johan Kahrs
- No. of torches: 350

The 1994 Winter Olympics torch relay was run from November 27, 1993 until February 12, 1994 prior to the 1994 Winter Olympics in Lillehammer. The route covered around 18,000 kilometres (11,000 mi) and involved over 6,916 torchbearers. Prince Haakon lit the cauldron at the opening ceremony. It is the sixth Winter torch relay (after 1972, 1976, 1980 and 1984) to have more than one route. On January 16, 1994, it traveled to the Arctic Circle.

== Route in Greece ==

January 16
1. Olympia
January 27-29
Athens

== Route in Europe ==

January 29
1. Athens
January 30
2. Stuttgart
January 31
3. Karlsruhe
February 1
4. Grefrath
5. Düsseldorf
February 2
6. Dortmund
February 3
7. Copenhagen
February 3
8. Hamburg
February 3
9. Helsinki
February 4
10. Stockholm
February 5
11. Oslo
February 6
12. Kongsvinger
February 7
13. Elverum
February 8
14. Trysil
February 9
15. Rena
February 10
16. Hamar
February 11
17. Sjusjøen
February 12
18. Lillehammer

== Route in Norway ==

November 27
1. Morgedal
2. Kviteseid
November 28
3. Kongsberg
November 29
4. Drammen
December 1
5. Skien
December 2
6. Risør
December 3
7. Arendal
December 4
8. Kristiansand
December 5
9. Kvinesdal
December 6
10. Egersund
December 7
11. Stavanger
December 8
12. Haugesund
December 9
13. Stord
December 11
13. Bergen
December 12
14. Voss
December 14
15. Gol
December 16
17. Hønefoss
December 17
18. Sogndal
December 18
19. Førde
December 19
20. Nordfjordeid
December 20
21. Ørsta
December 21
22. Ålesund
December 22
23. Molde
December 23
24. Kristiansund
December 24
25. Sunndalsøra
December 28
1. Oppdal
December 29
1. Løkken Verk
December 30
1. Beitstad
December 31
1. Tromsø
January 4
1. Kirkenes
January 5
1. Karasjok
January 6
1. Alta
January 10
1. Narvik
January 12
1. Sortland
January 13
1. Svolvær
January 14
1. Fauske
January 15
1. Bodø
January 16
1. Mo i Rana
January 17
1. Sandnessjøen
January 18
1. Terråk
January 19
1. Namsos
January 20
1. Steinkjer
January 21
1. Levanger
January 22
1. Trondheim
January 23
1. Støren
January 24
1. Røros
January 25
1. Tynset
January 29
1. Eidsvoll
January 30
1. Tønsberg
January 30
1. Lillestrøm
January 31
1. Mysen
February 1
80. Halden
February 2
80. Sarpsborg
February 3
80. Asker
February 4
80. Sandvika
February 5
80. Oslo
February 6
80. Kongsvinger
February 7
80. Elverum
February 8
80. Trysil
February 9
80. Rena
February 10
80. Hamar
February 11
80. Sjusjøen
February 12
80. Lillehammer
