= Stein Hamnes =

Norwegian politician

Stein Hamnes (9 February 1940 – 24 September 1994) was a Norwegian politician for the Labour Party.

He grew up in Hitra Municipality, where his father served as mayor. He attended secondary school at Orkdal landsgymnas, and studied at the Norwegian College of Teaching in Trondheim. He settled in Vestre Slidre Municipality; after a period as headmaster of the lower secondary school there, he served as director of education in Øystre Slidre Municipality.

Ahead of the 1994 Norwegian European Union membership referendum, the Labour Party solidly supported EU membership, whereas individual members such as Stein Hamnes were against. He was a part of Sosialdemokrater mot EU, and while a deputy MP, Hamnes was noted for voting against his party in a EU-related issue.

He served as a deputy representative to the Parliament of Norway from Oppland during the term 1993–1997. He died only one year into his term. In total he met during 21 days of parliamentary session.

Hamnes was also a central board member of Norges Handicapidrettsforbund and was an official during the 1994 Winter Paralympics in Lillehammer. He was married, but childless. He died in September 1994.
