= Saint Jetmund Church =

Church in Møre og Romsdal, Norway

- Sankt Jetmund kyrkje
- Old Vanylven Church
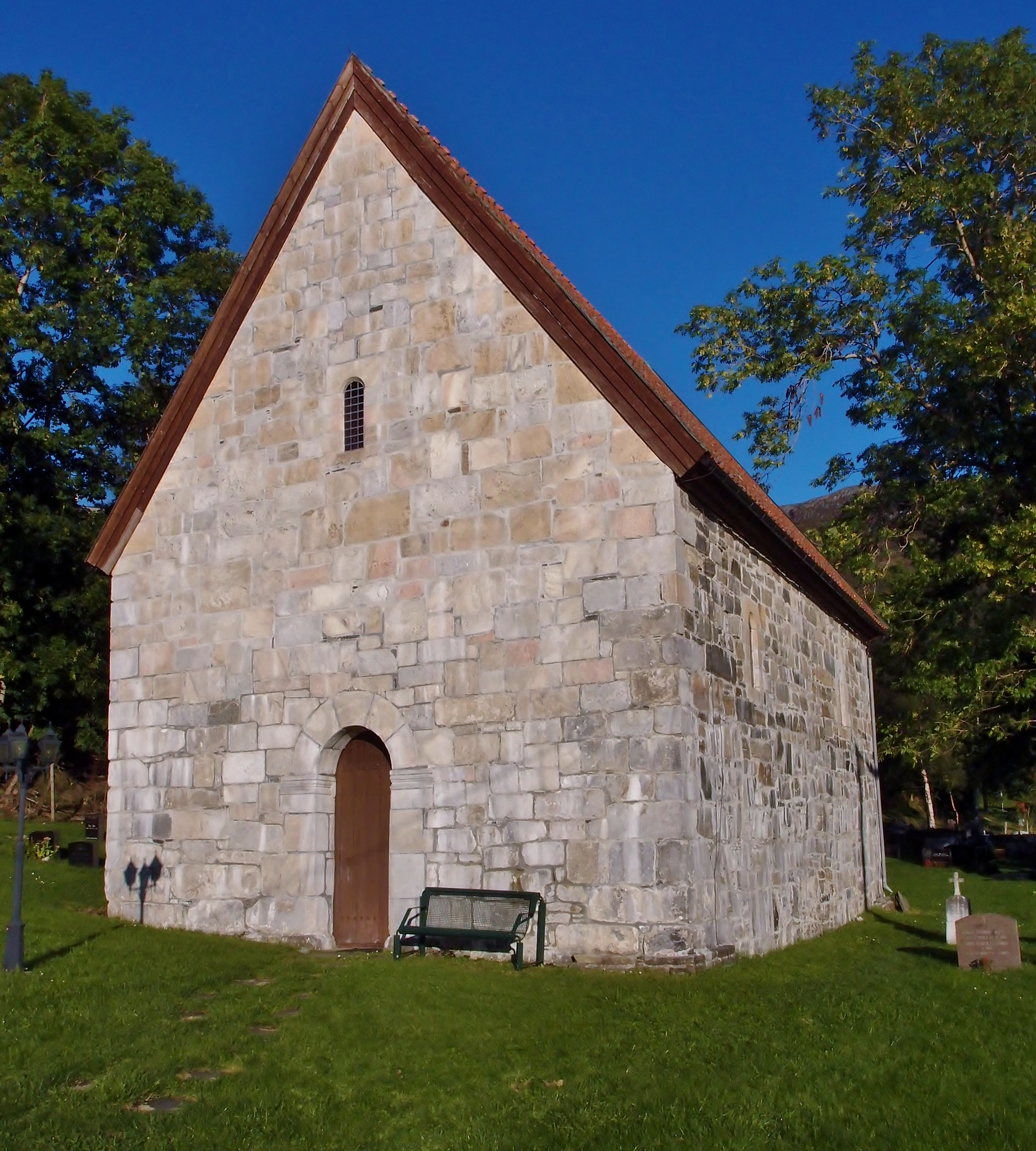
- View of the church
- Saint Jetmund Church
- 62°02′23″N 5°31′09″E
- Location: Vanylven Municipality, Møre og Romsdal
- Country: Norway
- Denomination: Church of Norway
- Previous denomination: Catholic Church
- Churchmanship: Evangelical Lutheran

History
- Former name: Vanylven Church
- Status: Parish church
- Founded: c. 1150
- Dedication: St. Jetmund
- Consecrated: 11 August 1957

Architecture
- Functional status: Museum
- Architect(s): Johan Lindstrøm and Cato Engen
- Architectural type: Long church
- Completed: 1957 (69 years ago)
- Closed: 1864-1957

Specifications
- Materials: Stone

Administration
- Diocese: Møre bispedømme
- Deanery: Søre Sunnmøre prosti
- Parish: Vanylven
- Norwegian Cultural Heritage Site
- Type: Church
- Status: Automatically protected
- ID: 85534

Saint Jetmund Church (Norwegian: Sankt Jetmund kyrkje) is a former parish church of the Church of Norway in Vanylven Municipality in Møre og Romsdal county, Norway. It is located in the village of Åheim, on the eastern shore of the Vanylvsfjorden. It is now a museum and historic site, but the church was once the main church for the Vanylven parish which is now part of the Søre Sunnmøre prosti (deanery) in the Diocese of Møre. The marble and stone church was rebuilt in a long church design between 1931 and 1957 using plans drawn up by the architect Johan Lindstrøm and the historian Cato Engen.

The marble and stone church was originally built in 1150 and torn down in 1864 when it was replaced by the newly built Vanylven Church in nearby Slagnes. The church was rebuilt as a museum in 1957.

== History ==
The earliest existing historical records of the old stone church date back to 1403, but the church wasn't new at that time. The first church in Vanylven was a stone long church that was likely built around the year 1150. It was called Vanylven Church originally. The medieval church had a rectangular nave that measured 11.7 by 8.2 metres (38 ft × 27 ft) and narrower, square chancel that measured about 5.6 by 5.6 metres (18 ft × 18 ft). During the 1600s or early 1700s, the nave was enlarged with a timber-framed addition on the west end of the building.

In 1814, this church served as an election church (Norwegian: valgkirke). Together with more than 300 other parish churches across Norway, it was a polling station for elections to the 1814 Norwegian Constituent Assembly which wrote the Constitution of Norway. This was Norway's first national elections. Each church parish was a constituency that elected people called "electors" who later met together in each county to elect the representatives for the assembly that was to meet at Eidsvoll Manor later that year.

In 1844, the parish considered expanding the church since it was too small for the population, but this was not carried out. A law passed in 1851 required the church be able to seat at least 30% of the people living in the parish, so it had to be enlarged or replaced. Years of debate ensued and eventually it was decided that a new church would be built. Since there was not much room on the old site to build a larger church and the fact that most of the parish was living in Fiskåbygd, it was also decided to move the church site about 5 kilometres (3.1 mi) to the north. In 1863, the old church was torn down to about 1 metre (3 ft 3 in) above the ground level. The stone materials that were torn down were sold and reused in other area buildings. Besides the foundation remaining, the chancel portal and archway were also left in place. The same year, the new Vanylven Church in the nearby village of Slagnes was opened.

The medieval church site sat vacant from 1864 to 1931 when it was decided to reconstruct the old church for historical purposes. In 1931, the overgrown church site was cleared after the site was purchased by Lars Lid. In 1937, the architect Johan Lindstrøm and the historian Cato Engen, in conjunction with the Norwegian Directorate for Cultural Heritage, led the construction of a replica of the historic church using the old plans for the building and using the old foundations that were never removed. Work on the project was paused for a number of years during World War II, but resumed in 1950. In 1957, the church was completed and it was consecrated by the bishop on 11 August 1957. Since its reconstruction, it has been known as the St. Jetmund Church rather than its historical name since there is a new Vanylven Church now. Many of the original stones were reclaimed and reused in the new church. The new church is now a museum.

=== Dedication ===
The church was named after St. Edmund (Norwegian: Sankt Jetmund), an English saint. He was a medieval King of England who had been in Åheim (and according to legend, he founded the church). He was killed by Vikings and later made a saint.

== Media gallery ==
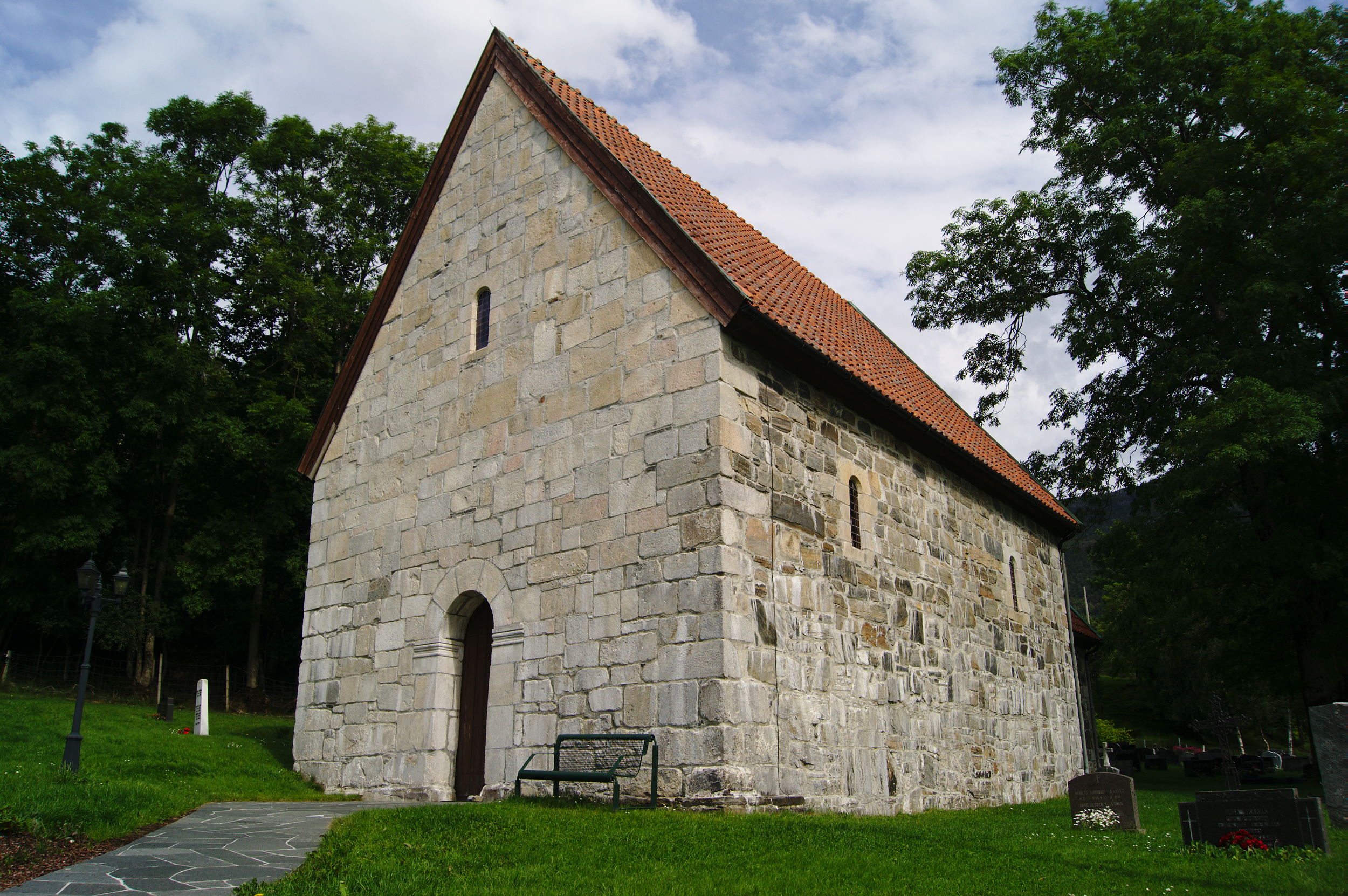

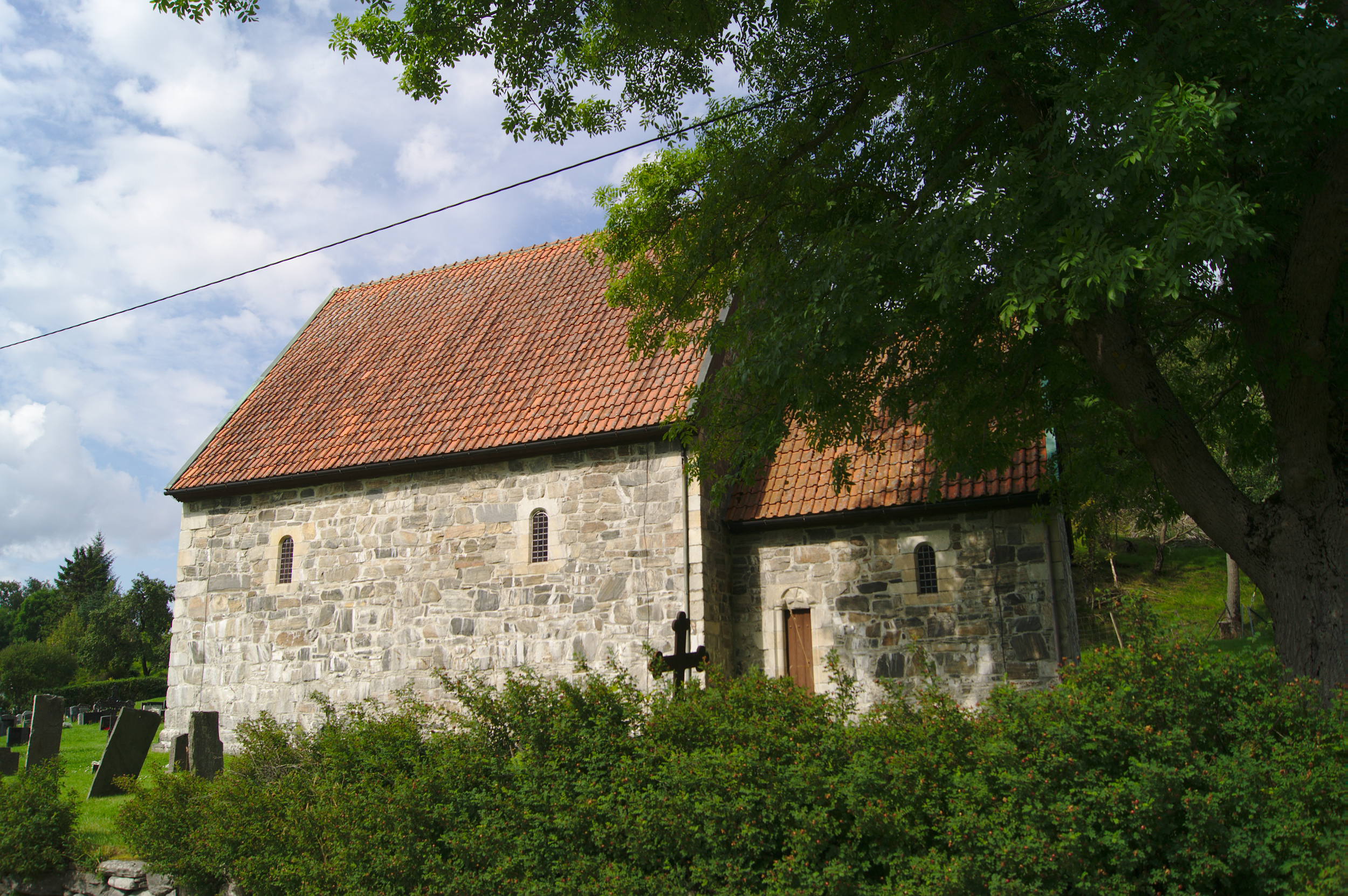

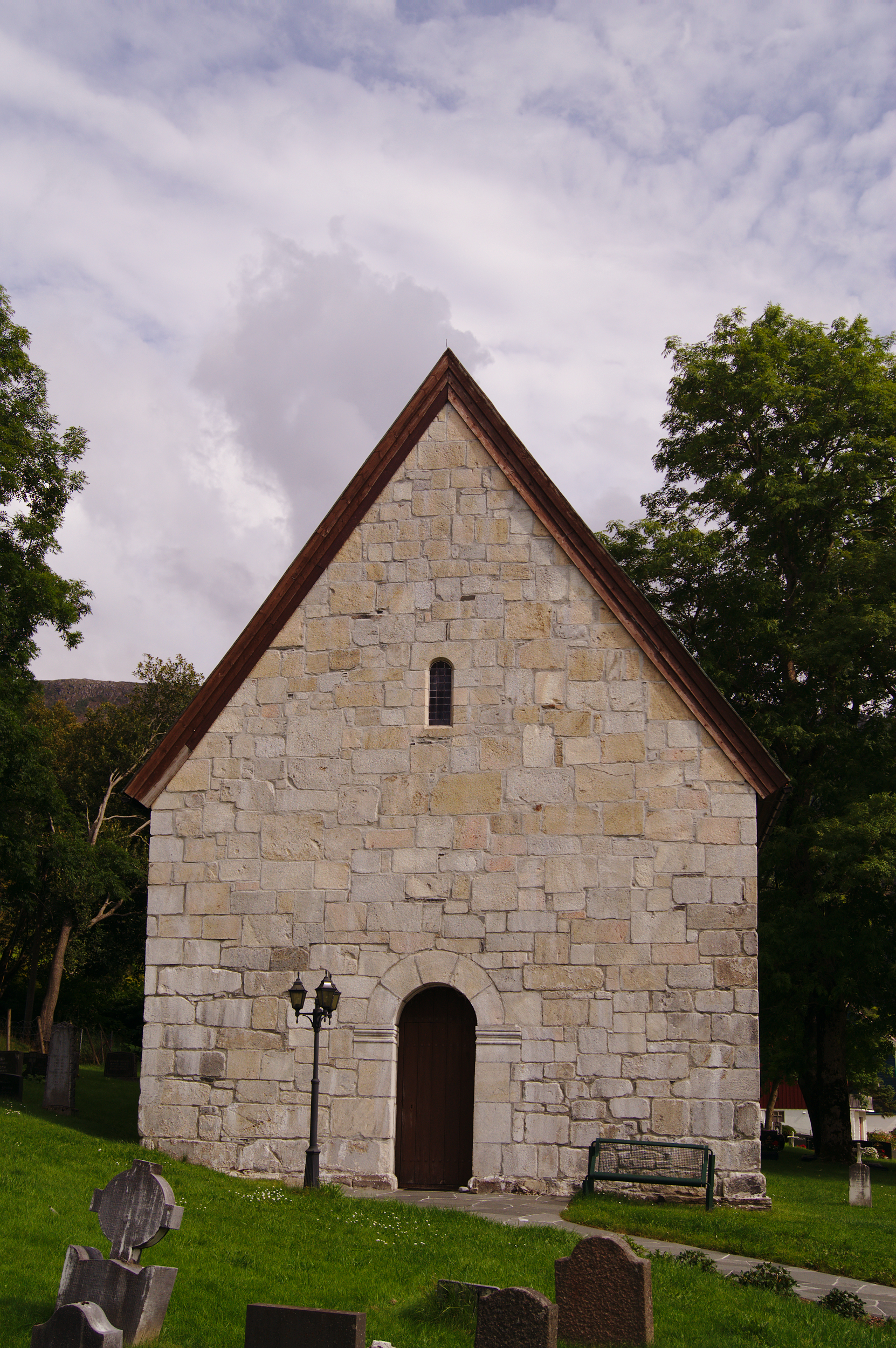

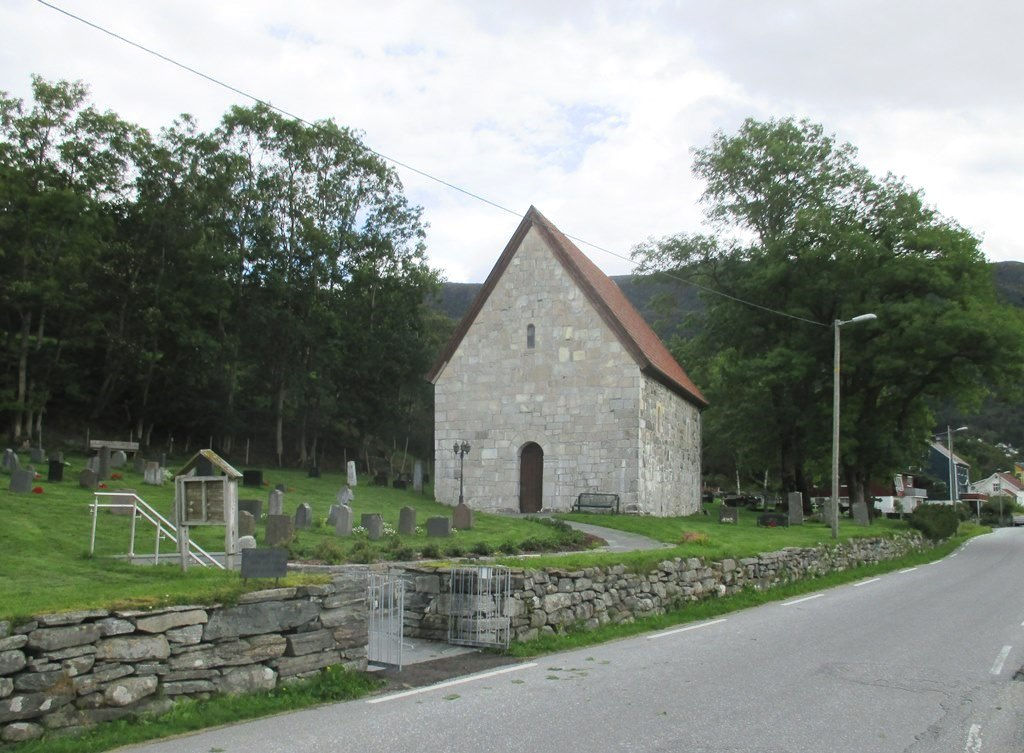

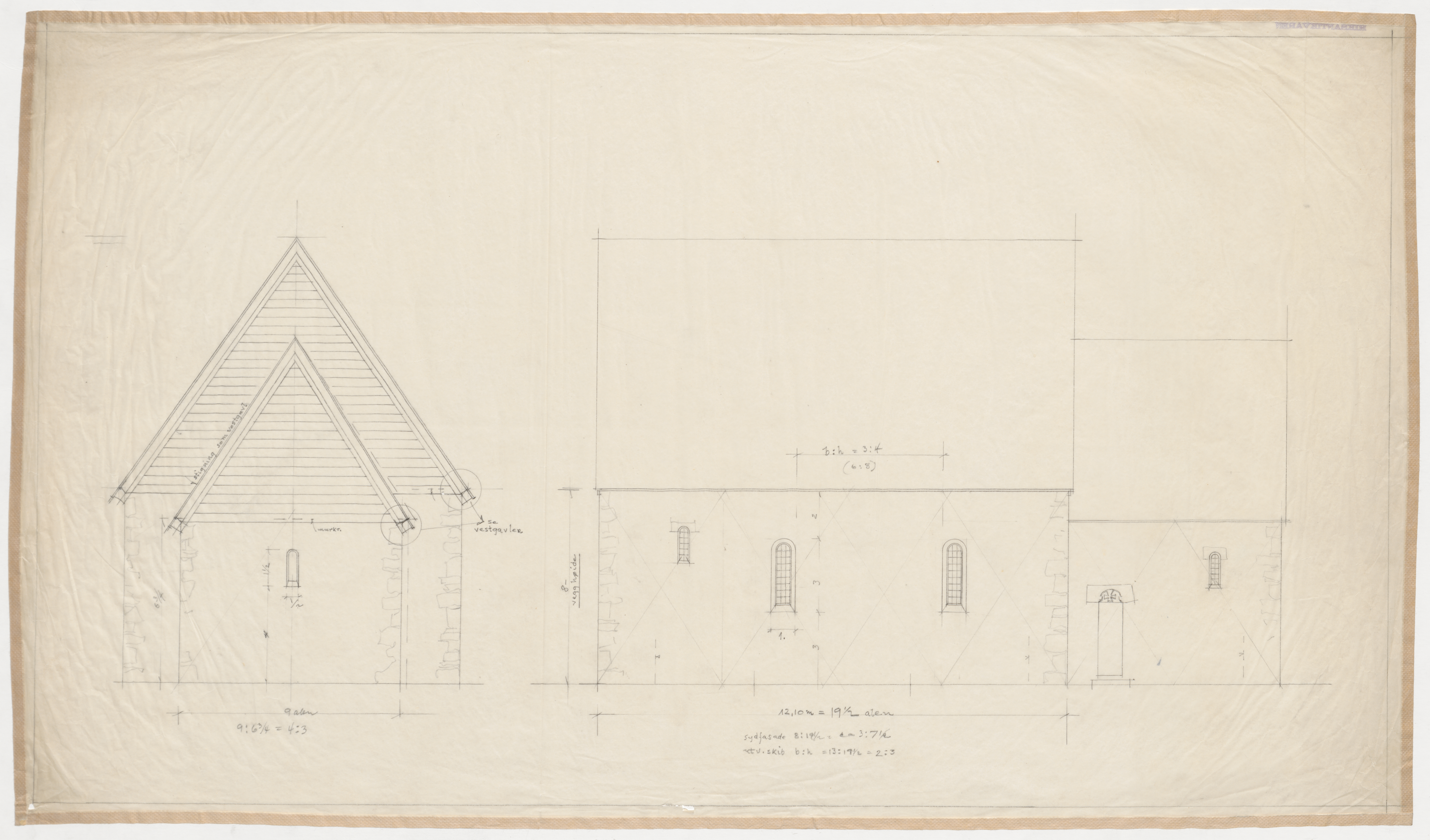

== See also ==
- List of churches in Møre
