= Vanylven Church =

Church in Møre og Romsdal, Norway

- Vanylven kyrkje
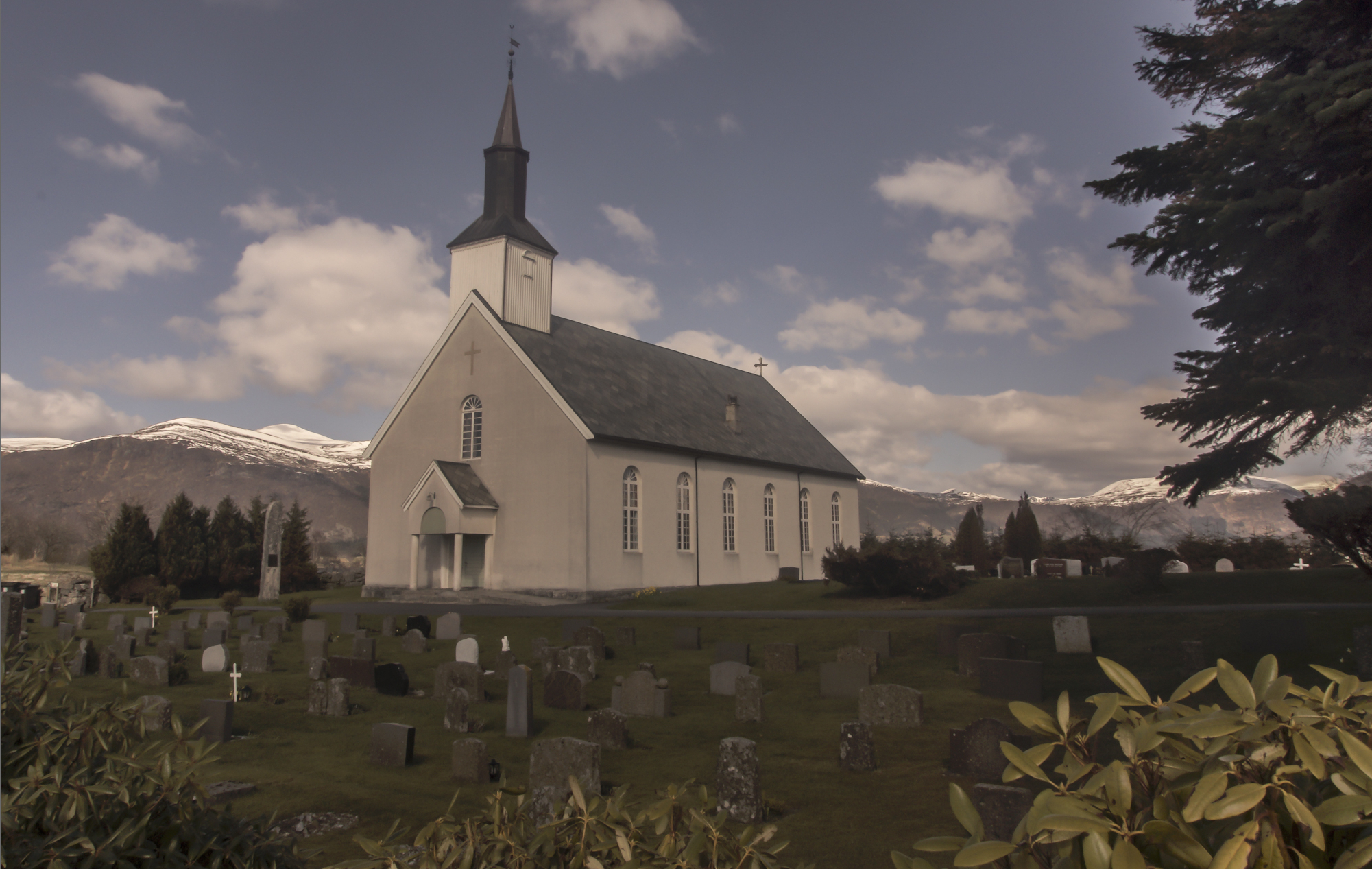
- View of the church
- Vanylven Church
- 62°04′29″N 5°31′32″E
- Location: Slagnes, Møre og Romsdal
- Country: Norway
- Denomination: Church of Norway
- Churchmanship: Evangelical Lutheran

History
- Status: Parish church
- Founded: 1864
- Consecrated: 1864

Architecture
- Functional status: Active
- Architect: Georg Andreas Bull
- Architectural type: Rectangular
- Completed: 1864 (162 years ago)

Specifications
- Capacity: 320
- Materials: Brick

Administration
- Diocese: Møre bispedømme
- Deanery: Søre Sunnmøre prosti
- Parish: Vanylven
- Norwegian Cultural Heritage Site
- Type: Church
- Status: Not protected
- ID: 85765

Vanylven Church (Norwegian: Vanylven kyrkje) is a parish church of the Church of Norway in Vanylven Municipality in Møre og Romsdal county, Norway. It is located in the village of Slagnes, on the shore of the Vanylvsfjorden. It is the church for the Vanylven parish which is part of the Søre Sunnmøre prosti (deanery) in the Diocese of Møre. The white, plastered brick church was built in a rectangular design in 1864 using plans drawn up by the architect Georg Andreas Bull. The church seats about 320 people.

== History ==
In 1844, the parish of Vanylven considered expanding the Old Vanylven Church since it was too small for the population, but this was not carried out. A law passed in 1851 required the church be able to seat at least 30% of the people living in the parish, so it had to be enlarged or replaced. Years of debate ensued and eventually it was decided that a new church would be built. Since there was not much room on the old site to build a larger church and the fact that most of the parish was living in Fiskå, it was also decided to move the church site about 5 kilometres (3.1 mi) to the north. In 1863, the old church was torn down and the same year, a new Vanylven Church was built in the nearby village of Slagnes. The new church was designed by Georg Andreas Bull, and the same drawings were later used for building a new Davik Church nearby. Construction was completed in the fall of 1863, and a number of items were transferred from the old church. The new church was consecrated on 21 February 1864. In 1959, a large new sacristy was built on the northeast end of the building. The new sacristy included a basement where there are bathrooms.

== See also ==
- List of churches in Møre
