= Widnes (disambiguation) =

Widnes is an industrial town within the borough of Halton, in Cheshire, England.

Widnes may also refer to:

- Marie Lovise Widnes (born 1930), Norwegian poet
- Municipal Borough of Widnes, former local government district in Lancashire, England
- Widnes (UK Parliament constituency), a county constituency in England
- Widnes railway station, a Grade II listed building in Cheshire
- Widnes Saints, a rugby league team
- Widnes Vikings, a professional rugby league club
