= Helge Simonnes =

Norwegian editor (born 1955)

Helge Simonnes (born 21 December 1955) is a Norwegian editor.

He is the current editor-in-chief of Vårt Land, and has been the chair of the Norwegian Press Association and the Norwegian Media Businesses' Association. A siv.øk. by education, he has also minored in political science and law.

He hails from Vanylven Municipality.
