= Fiskåbygd =

Village in Vanylven Municipality, Norway

Fiskå Fiskåbygd
- Village
- Interactive map of Fiskå
- Location within Møre og Romsdal Location within Norway
- Coordinates: 62.1007°N 5.5579°E
- Country: Norway
- Region: Western Norway
- County: Møre og Romsdal
- District: Sunnmøre
- Municipality: Vanylven Municipality

Area
  - Total: 0.69 km^{2} (0.27 sq mi)
- Elevation: 14 m (46 ft)

Population (2024)
  - Total: 486
  - Density: 704/km^{2} (1,820/sq mi)
- Time zone: UTC+01:00 (CET)
  - Summer (DST): UTC+02:00 (CEST)
- Post Code: 6143 Fiskå

Fiskåbygd or Fiskå is a coastal village that is also the administrative centre of Vanylven Municipality in Møre og Romsdal county, Norway. The village is located about 100 kilometres (62 mi) southwest of the city of Ålesund, about 12 kilometres (7.5 mi) east of the village of Syvde, and about 30 kilometres (19 mi) southwest of the village of Rovdane. Fiskå lies along the shores of the Vanylvsfjorden, east of the Stadlandet peninsula in Stad Municipality.

The 0.69-square-kilometre (170-acre) village has a population (2024) of 486 and a population density of 704 inhabitants per square kilometre (1,820/sq mi).

The nearest church is Vanylven Church, located in Slagnes about 15 kilometres (9.3 mi) to the southwest.

== Climate ==
Climate data for Fiskåbygd 1991-2020 (41 m)
| Month | Jan | Feb | Mar | Apr | May | Jun | Jul | Aug | Sep | Oct | Nov | Dec | Year |
|---|---|---|---|---|---|---|---|---|---|---|---|---|---|
| Mean daily maximum °C (°F) | 4.4 (39.9) | 4.3 (39.7) | 6.1 (43.0) | 9.5 (49.1) | 13.2 (55.8) | 15.5 (59.9) | 17.9 (64.2) | 18.1 (64.6) | 15.2 (59.4) | 10.7 (51.3) | 6.8 (44.2) | 4.6 (40.3) | 10.5 (50.9) |
| Daily mean °C (°F) | 2 (36) | 1.6 (34.9) | 2.9 (37.2) | 5.7 (42.3) | 8.8 (47.8) | 11.7 (53.1) | 14 (57) | 14.1 (57.4) | 11.2 (52.2) | 7.3 (45.1) | 4.3 (39.7) | 2.2 (36.0) | 7.2 (44.9) |
| Mean daily minimum °C (°F) | −0.8 (30.6) | −1.3 (29.7) | −0.3 (31.5) | 2.3 (36.1) | 5.1 (41.2) | 8.2 (46.8) | 10.8 (51.4) | 10.7 (51.3) | 8.1 (46.6) | 4.3 (39.7) | 1.4 (34.5) | −0.7 (30.7) | −4.1 (24.6) |
| Average precipitation mm (inches) | 225.4 (8.87) | 205.3 (8.08) | 180.5 (7.11) | 119.6 (4.71) | 109.9 (4.33) | 120.5 (4.74) | 114.3 (4.50) | 183 (7.2) | 235.3 (9.26) | 247.8 (9.76) | 238.7 (9.40) | 259.2 (10.20) | 2,239.5 (88.16) |
| Average precipitation days (≥ 1.0 mm) | 20 | 19 | 20 | 16 | 16 | 17 | 17 | 20 | 19 | 21 | 21 | 23 | 229 |
Source: Noaa WMO averages 91-2020 Norway
