= Slagnes =

Village in Vanylven Municipality, Norway

- Village
- Interactive map of Slagnes
- Location within Møre og Romsdal Location within Norway
- Coordinates: 62.0751°N 5.5233°E
- Country: Norway
- Region: Western Norway
- County: Møre og Romsdal
- District: Sunnmøre
- Municipality: Vanylven Municipality
- Elevation: 19 m (62 ft)
- Time zone: UTC+01:00 (CET)
  - Summer (DST): UTC+02:00 (CEST)
- Post Code: 6146 Åheim

Slagnes is a village in Vanylven Municipality in Møre og Romsdal county, Norway. The village is located along the Vanylvsfjorden, about 4 kilometres (2.5 mi) north of the village of Åheim. Slagnes is a small peninsula that sits about 3.5 kilometres (2.2 mi) across the fjord from the municipal centre of Fiskå. The small village of Slagnes is the site of Vanylven Church.

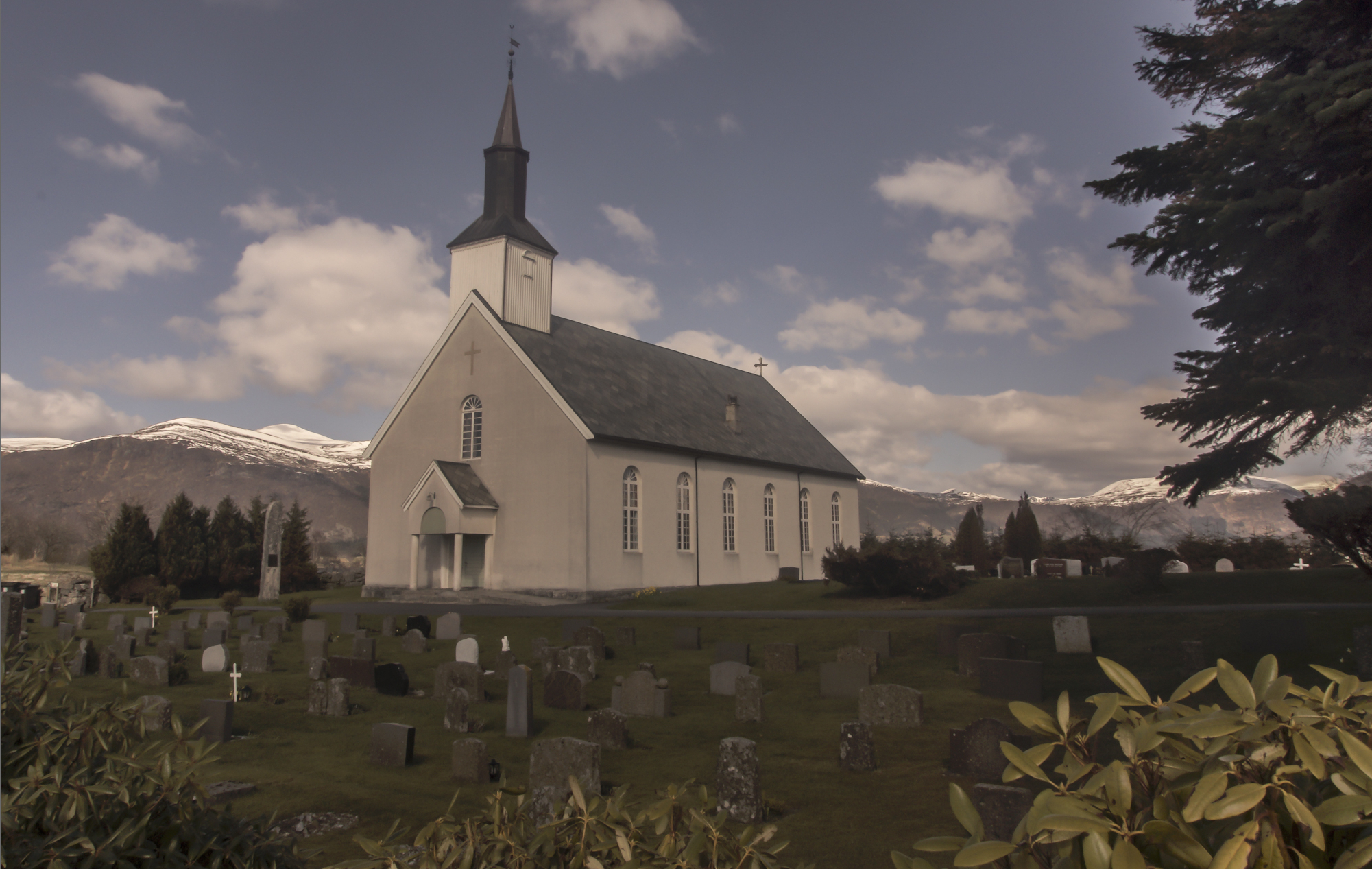
View of Vanylven Church in Slagnes
