= Vanylven Municipality =

Municipality in Møre og Romsdal, Norway

Vanylven Municipality Vanylven kommune
- Municipality
- Vannelven herred (historic name)
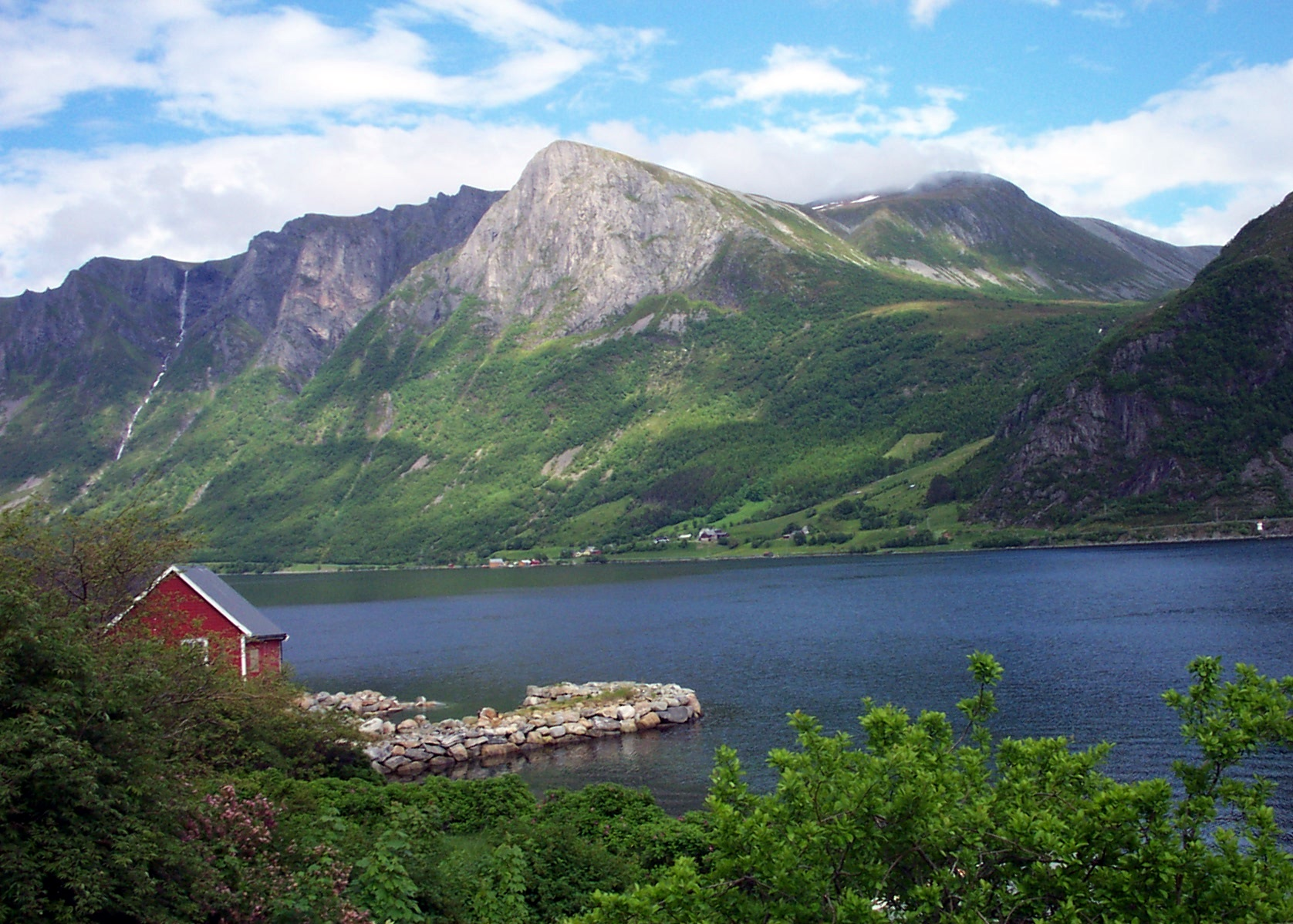
- View of the Vanylvsfjorden from Eidså

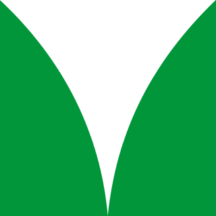
- Flag Coat of arms

- Møre og Romsdal within Norway

- Vanylven within Møre og Romsdal
- Coordinates: 62°03′38″N 05°41′51″E
- Country: Norway
- County: Møre og Romsdal
- District: Sunnmøre
- Established: 1 Jan 1838
  - Created as: Formannskapsdistrikt
- Administrative centre: Fiskå

Government
  - Mayor (2023): Paul Sindre Vedeld (Sp)

Area
  - Total: 385.11 km^{2} (148.69 sq mi)
  - Land: 365.08 km^{2} (140.96 sq mi)
  - Water: 20.03 km^{2} (7.73 sq mi) 5.2%
  - Rank: #240 in Norway
- Highest elevation: 1,142.95 m (3,749.8 ft)

Population (2024)
  - Total: 3,026
  - Rank: #228 in Norway
  - Density: 7.9/km^{2} (20/sq mi)
  - Change (10 years): ▼ −8.4%
- Demonym: Vanylving

Official language
  - Norwegian form: Nynorsk
- Time zone: UTC+01:00 (CET)
  - Summer (DST): UTC+02:00 (CEST)
- ISO 3166 code: NO-1511
- Website: Official website

Vanylven is a municipality in Møre og Romsdal county, Norway. It is part of the Sunnmøre region. The administrative centre is the village of Fiskå. Other villages in the municipality include Åheim, Åram, Rovdane, Eidså, Slagnes, and Syvde.

The 385-square-kilometre (149 sq mi) municipality is the 240th largest by area out of the 357 municipalities in Norway. Vanylven Municipality is the 228th most populous municipality in Norway with a population of 3,026. The municipality's population density is 7.9 inhabitants per square kilometre (20/sq mi) and its population has decreased by 8.4% over the previous 10-year period.

== General information ==
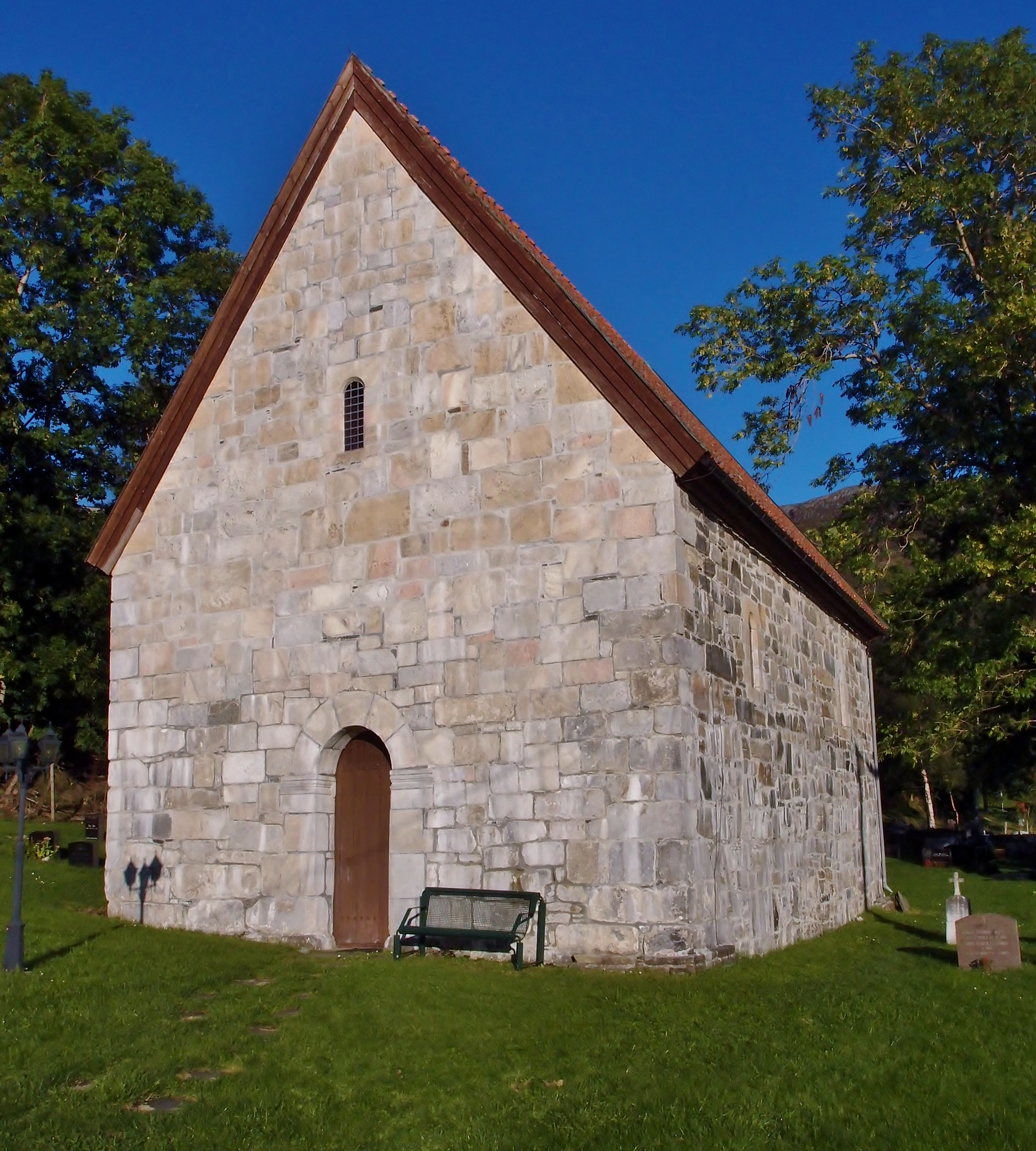
St. Jetmund Church

The parish of Vanelven was established as a municipality on 1 January 1838 (see formannskapsdistrikt law). The spelling was later changed to Vanylven. On 1 February 1918, the area around the Syvdsfjorden (population: 1,260) was separated to become the new Syvde Municipality. This left Vanylven Municipality with 1,848 residents.

During the 1960s, there were many municipal mergers across Norway due to the work of the Schei Committee. On 1 January 1964, Syvde Municipality (population: 1,458) and the Rovdestranda area (population: 436) of Rovde Municipality were both merged into Vanylven Municipality, giving Vanylven a new population of 3,897.

On 1 January 2002, the mainland Åram area north of Fiskåbygd (population: 380) was transferred from Sande Municipality to Vanylven Municipality.

=== Name ===
The municipality (originally the parish) is named after the Vanylvsfjorden (Old Norse: Vaniflir). The meaning of the first element is uncertain, but it may come from the word vaðr which means "fishing line" or vannr which mean "dark" or "colorless", referring to the occurrence of olivine in the area. The last element is iflir which is frequently used in the Sunnmøre area in the names of fjords. It possibly comes from the word viflir which means "low, wet terrain". Historically, the name was written Vanelven. In 1889, the spelling was changed to Vannelven. On 3 November 1917, a royal resolution changed the spelling of the name of the municipality to Vanylven.

=== Coat of arms ===
The coat of arms was granted on 11 December 1987. The official blazon is "Vert, a pile embowed argent" (Norwegian: På grøn grunn ein nedvend sølv spiss laga med bogeliner). This means the arms have a green field (background) and the charge is a pile embowed (a triangle with curved sides). The charge has a tincture of argent which means it is commonly colored white, but if it is made out of metal, then silver is used. The arms are meant to show how the Vanylvsfjorden meets the sea, surrounded by the fertile green lands of Vanylven. The fertile lands and the sea which is full of herring are both important industries to the municipality which is why the colors green (land) and silver (sea) were chosen for the arms. The arms were designed by Jostein O. Mo. The municipal flag has the same design as the coat of arms.

=== Churches ===
The Church of Norway has four parishes (sokn) within Vanylven Municipality. It is part of the Søre Sunnmøre prosti (deanery) in the Diocese of Møre.

Churches in Vanylven Municipality
Parish (sokn)	Church name	Location of the church	Year built
Vanylven	Vanylven Church	Slagnes	1863
Syvde	Syvde Church	Syvde	1837
Rovde	Rovde Church	Rovdane	1872
Åram	Åram Church	Åram	1927
Åheim	Saint Jetmund Church	Åheim	1130

== Geography ==
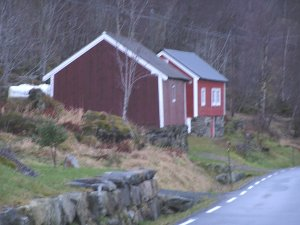

Vanylven borders Sande Municipality and Herøy Municipality in the north (across the Rovdefjorden). Volda Municipality lies to the east; and Stad Municipality (in Vestland county) is located to the south.

Vanylven Municipality is located on the mainland of Norway and it is surrounded by several fjords. The Vanylvsfjorden lies to the west and the Rovdefjorden to the north. The Syvdsfjorden cuts into the municipality from the north and it empties into the Rovdefjorden. The Syltefjorden branches off the main Vanylvsfjorden, just past the village of Fiskåbygd. The highest point in the municipality is the 1,142.95-metre (3,749.8 ft) tall mountain Storeblæja, just north of the border with Volda Municipality.

== Climate ==
Climate data for Fiskåbygd 1991-2020 (41 m)
Month	Jan	Feb	Mar	Apr	May	Jun	Jul	Aug	Sep	Oct	Nov	Dec	Year
Mean daily maximum °C (°F)	4.4 (39.9)	4.3 (39.7)	6.1 (43.0)	9.5 (49.1)	13.2 (55.8)	15.5 (59.9)	17.9 (64.2)	18.1 (64.6)	15.2 (59.4)	10.7 (51.3)	6.8 (44.2)	4.6 (40.3)	10.5 (50.9)
Daily mean °C (°F)	2 (36)	1.6 (34.9)	2.9 (37.2)	5.7 (42.3)	8.8 (47.8)	11.7 (53.1)	14 (57)	14.1 (57.4)	11.2 (52.2)	7.3 (45.1)	4.3 (39.7)	2.2 (36.0)	7.2 (44.9)
Mean daily minimum °C (°F)	−0.8 (30.6)	−1.3 (29.7)	−0.3 (31.5)	2.3 (36.1)	5.1 (41.2)	8.2 (46.8)	10.8 (51.4)	10.7 (51.3)	8.1 (46.6)	4.3 (39.7)	1.4 (34.5)	−0.7 (30.7)	−4.1 (24.6)
Average precipitation mm (inches)	225.4 (8.87)	205.3 (8.08)	180.5 (7.11)	119.6 (4.71)	109.9 (4.33)	120.5 (4.74)	114.3 (4.50)	183 (7.2)	235.3 (9.26)	247.8 (9.76)	238.7 (9.40)	259.2 (10.20)	2,239.5 (88.16)
Average precipitation days (≥ 1.0 mm)	20	19	20	16	16	17	17	20	19	21	21	23	229
Source: Noaa WMO averages 91-2020 Norway

== Government ==
Vanylven Municipality is responsible for primary education (through 10th grade), outpatient health services, senior citizen services, welfare and other social services, zoning, economic development, and municipal roads and utilities. The municipality is governed by a municipal council of directly elected representatives. The mayor is indirectly elected by a vote of the municipal council. The municipality is under the jurisdiction of the Sunnmøre District Court and the Frostating Court of Appeal.

=== Municipal council ===
The municipal council (Kommunestyre) of Vanylven Municipality is made up of 21 representatives that are elected to four year terms. The tables below show the current and historical composition of the council by political party.

Vanylven kommunestyre 2023–2027
Party name (in Nynorsk)	Number of representatives
Labour Party (Arbeidarpartiet)	3
Progress Party (Framstegspartiet)	3
Conservative Party (Høgre)	2
Industry and Business Party (Industri‑ og Næringspartiet)	4
Christian Democratic Party (Kristeleg Folkeparti)	1
Centre Party (Senterpartiet)	4
Liberal Party (Venstre)	4
Total number of members:	21

Vanylven kommunestyre 2019–2023
Party name (in Nynorsk)	Number of representatives
Labour Party (Arbeidarpartiet)	3
Progress Party (Framstegspartiet)	3
Conservative Party (Høgre)	3
Christian Democratic Party (Kristeleg Folkeparti)	2
Centre Party (Senterpartiet)	4
Liberal Party (Venstre)	4
Healthcare Party (Helsepartiet)	2
Total number of members:	21

Vanylven kommunestyre 2015–2019
Party name (in Nynorsk)	Number of representatives
Labour Party (Arbeidarpartiet)	5
Progress Party (Framstegspartiet)	3
Conservative Party (Høgre)	3
Christian Democratic Party (Kristeleg Folkeparti)	3
Centre Party (Senterpartiet)	3
Liberal Party (Venstre)	4
Total number of members:	21

Vanylven kommunestyre 2011–2015
Party name (in Nynorsk)	Number of representatives
Labour Party (Arbeidarpartiet)	4
Progress Party (Framstegspartiet)	4
Conservative Party (Høgre)	3
Christian Democratic Party (Kristeleg Folkeparti)	4
Centre Party (Senterpartiet)	4
Liberal Party (Venstre)	2
Total number of members:	21

Vanylven kommunestyre 2007–2011
Party name (in Nynorsk)	Number of representatives
Labour Party (Arbeidarpartiet)	4
Progress Party (Framstegspartiet)	4
Conservative Party (Høgre)	2
Christian Democratic Party (Kristeleg Folkeparti)	5
Coastal Party (Kystpartiet)	1
Centre Party (Senterpartiet)	3
Liberal Party (Venstre)	2
Total number of members:	21

Vanylven kommunestyre 2003–2007
Party name (in Nynorsk)	Number of representatives
Labour Party (Arbeidarpartiet)	3
Progress Party (Framstegspartiet)	4
Conservative Party (Høgre)	2
Christian Democratic Party (Kristeleg Folkeparti)	3
Coastal Party (Kystpartiet)	3
Centre Party (Senterpartiet)	4
Socialist Left Party (Sosialistisk Venstreparti)	1
Liberal Party (Venstre)	1
Total number of members:	21

Vanylven kommunestyre 1999–2003
Party name (in Nynorsk)	Number of representatives
Labour Party (Arbeidarpartiet)	5
Conservative Party (Høgre)	3
Christian Democratic Party (Kristeleg Folkeparti)	4
Coastal Party (Kystpartiet)	4
Centre Party (Senterpartiet)	4
Liberal Party (Venstre)	1
Total number of members:	21

Vanylven kommunestyre 1995–1999
Party name (in Nynorsk)	Number of representatives
Labour Party (Arbeidarpartiet)	7
Conservative Party (Høgre)	4
Christian Democratic Party (Kristeleg Folkeparti)	5
Centre Party (Senterpartiet)	6
Socialist Left Party (Sosialistisk Venstreparti)	1
Liberal Party (Venstre)	6
Total number of members:	29

Vanylven kommunestyre 1991–1995
Party name (in Nynorsk)	Number of representatives
Labour Party (Arbeidarpartiet)	8
Conservative Party (Høgre)	3
Christian Democratic Party (Kristeleg Folkeparti)	7
Centre Party (Senterpartiet)	8
Liberal Party (Venstre)	3
Total number of members:	29

Vanylven kommunestyre 1987–1991
Party name (in Nynorsk)	Number of representatives
Labour Party (Arbeidarpartiet)	9
Conservative Party (Høgre)	5
Christian Democratic Party (Kristeleg Folkeparti)	5
Centre Party (Senterpartiet)	6
Liberal Party (Venstre)	4
Total number of members:	29

Vanylven kommunestyre 1983–1987
Party name (in Nynorsk)	Number of representatives
Labour Party (Arbeidarpartiet)	7
Conservative Party (Høgre)	6
Christian Democratic Party (Kristeleg Folkeparti)	6
Centre Party (Senterpartiet)	6
Liberal Party (Venstre)	3
Common list for Vik, Åheim, Sundal, and Almklovdalen (Samlingslista for Vik, Åheim, Sundal og Almklovdalen)	1
Total number of members:	29

Vanylven kommunestyre 1979–1983
Party name (in Nynorsk)	Number of representatives
Labour Party (Arbeidarpartiet)	5
Conservative Party (Høgre)	7
Christian Democratic Party (Kristeleg Folkeparti)	5
Centre Party (Senterpartiet)	7
Liberal Party (Venstre)	3
Syvde Common List (Syvde Samlingsliste)	1
Common list for Vik, Åheim, Sunndal, and Almklovdalen (Samlingsliste for Vik, Åheim, Sunndal og Almklovdalen)	1
Total number of members:	29

Vanylven kommunestyre 1975–1979
Party name (in Nynorsk)	Number of representatives
Labour Party (Arbeidarpartiet)	4
Christian Democratic Party (Kristeleg Folkeparti)	5
Centre Party (Senterpartiet)	7
Liberal Party (Venstre)	2
Common list for Inner Syvde (Samlingsliste for Indre Syvde)	4
Common list for Vik, Åheim, Sundal, and Almklovdal (Samlingsliste for Vik, Åheim, Sundal og Almklovdal)	3
Common list for Nordstranda, Fiskå, Tunheim, and Sylte (Samlingsliste for Nordstranda, Fiskå, Tunheim og Sylte)	3
Common list for Rovde (Samlingsliste for Rovde)	1
Total number of members:	29

Vanylven kommunestyre 1971–1975
Party name (in Nynorsk)	Number of representatives
Labour Party (Arbeidarpartiet)	4
Christian Democratic Party (Kristeleg Folkeparti)	4
Centre Party (Senterpartiet)	8
Liberal Party (Venstre)	4
Local List(s) (Lokale lister)	9
Total number of members:	29

Vanylven kommunestyre 1967–1971
Party name (in Nynorsk)	Number of representatives
Labour Party (Arbeidarpartiet)	2
Centre Party (Senterpartiet)	3
Liberal Party (Venstre)	2
Local List(s) (Lokale lister)	22
Total number of members:	29

Vanylven kommunestyre 1963–1967
Party name (in Nynorsk)	Number of representatives
Local List(s) (Lokale lister)	29
Total number of members:	29

Vanylven heradsstyre 1959–1963
Party name (in Nynorsk)	Number of representatives
Labour Party (Arbeidarpartiet)	2
Local List(s) (Lokale lister)	19
Total number of members:	21

Vanylven heradsstyre 1955–1959
Party name (in Nynorsk)	Number of representatives
Labour Party (Arbeidarpartiet)	1
Local List(s) (Lokale lister)	20
Total number of members:	21

Vanylven heradsstyre 1951–1955
Party name (in Nynorsk)	Number of representatives
Labour Party (Arbeidarpartiet)	2
Local List(s) (Lokale lister)	18
Total number of members:	20

Vanylven heradsstyre 1947–1951
Party name (in Nynorsk)	Number of representatives
Local List(s) (Lokale lister)	20
Total number of members:	20

Vanylven heradsstyre 1945–1947
Party name (in Nynorsk)	Number of representatives
Local List(s) (Lokale lister)	20
Total number of members:	20

Vanylven heradsstyre 1937–1941*
Party name (in Nynorsk)	Number of representatives
Labour Party (Arbeidarpartiet)	5
Local List(s) (Lokale lister)	15
Total number of members:	20
Note: Due to the German occupation of Norway during World War II, no elections were held for new municipal councils until after the war ended in 1945.

=== Mayors ===
The mayor (Nynorsk: ordførar) of Vanylven Municipality is the political leader of the municipality and the chairperson of the municipal council. Here is a list of people who have held this position:

- 1838–1839: Jon J. Sundal
- 1840–1843: Nicolai Christian Synnestvedt
- 1844–1855: Jon J. Sundal
- 1856–1859: Hans A. Thunem
- 1860–1863: Bern Krøvel
- 1864–1869: Samson Qviebakke
- 1870–1871: Bern Krøvel
- 1872–1875: Samson Qviebakke
- 1876–1877: Matias O. Thunem
- 1878–1879: Bernt S. Breiteig
- 1880–1895: Matias O. Thunem
- 1896–1901: Gerhard K. Fiskå
- 1902–1913: Kristian R. Sandnes
- 1914–1919: Ola Hellebust
- 1920–1925: Andreas M. Osnes
- 1926–1931: Petter I. Lien
- 1932–1934: John A. Aasen
- 1935–1937: Andreas M. Osnes
- 1938–1945: John A. Aasen
- 1945–1945: Sverre Nybø (H)
- 1946–1949: Knut Rønnestad
- 1950–1951: Knut A. Thunem
- 1952–1955: Anfinn M. Skorge
- 1956–1959: Einar Orten
- 1960–1961: Sverre Nybø (H)
- 1962–1963: Olav A. Aarø
- 1964–1965: Osnes
- 1966–1973: Ola Øvregård
- 1974–1975: Svein Thunem
- 1976–1983: Ragnar Vik
- 1984–1987: Jon Arne Lillebø (KrF)
- 1988–2003: Jon Aasen (Ap)
- 2003–2015: Jan Helgøy (KrF)
- 2015–2023: Lena M. Landsverk Sande (V)
- 2023–present: Paul Sindre Vedeld (Sp)

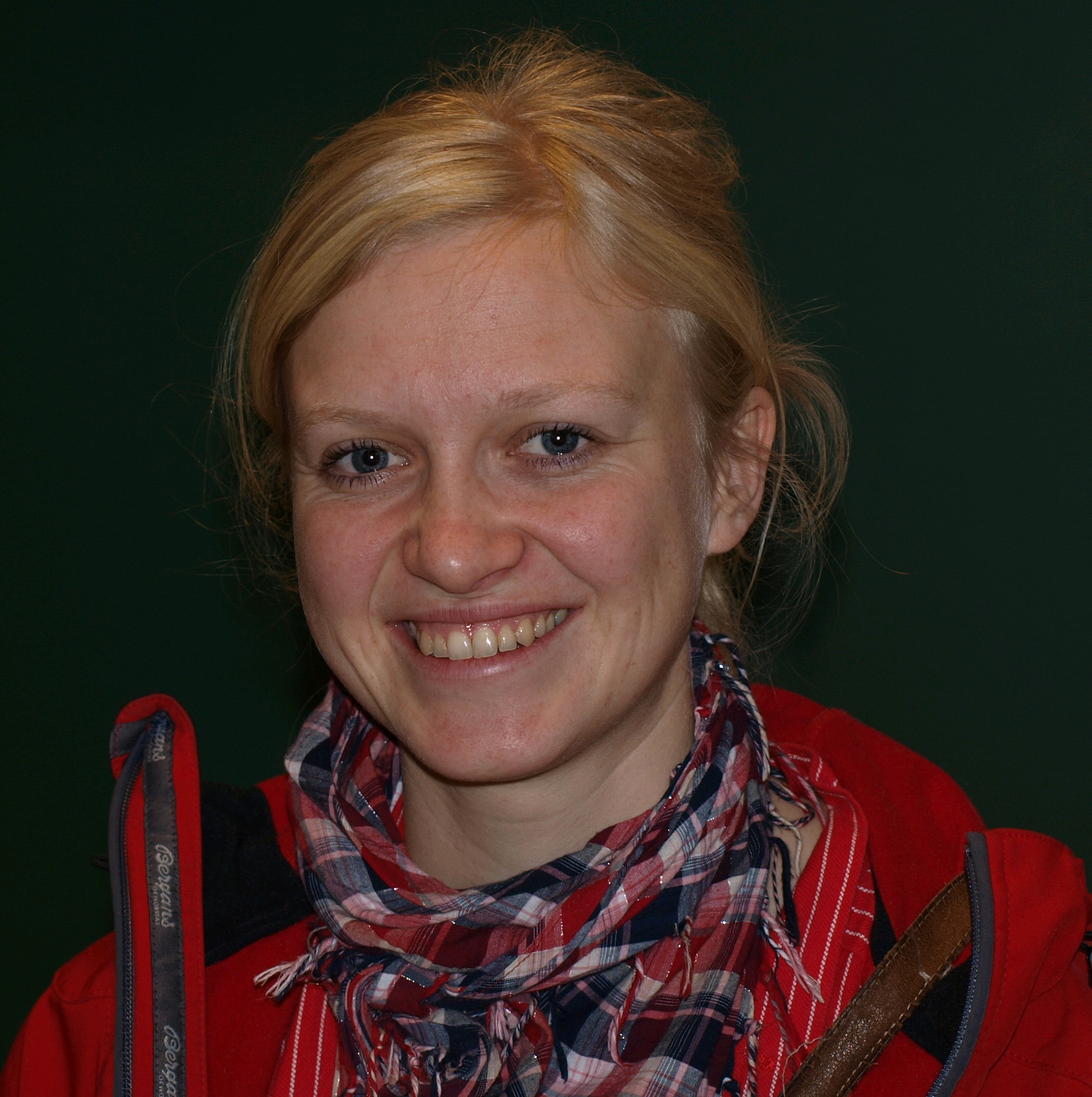
Maria Parr, 2009

== Notable people ==
- Jacob Vidnes (1875 in Vanylven – 1940), a trade unionist, newspaper editor, and politician
- Marie Lovise Widnes (born 1930 in Vanylven), a poet, author, singer, composer, and politician
- Helge Simonnes (born 1955 in Vanylven), an editor and current editor-in-chief of Vårt Land
- Else Mundal (born 1944 in Vanylven), a philologist and academic
- Maria Parr (born 1981 in Vanylven), a children's writer
