= Stad Ship Tunnel =

Planned canal and tunnel in Vestland county, Norway

Coordinates: 62°00′41″N 05°26′15″E

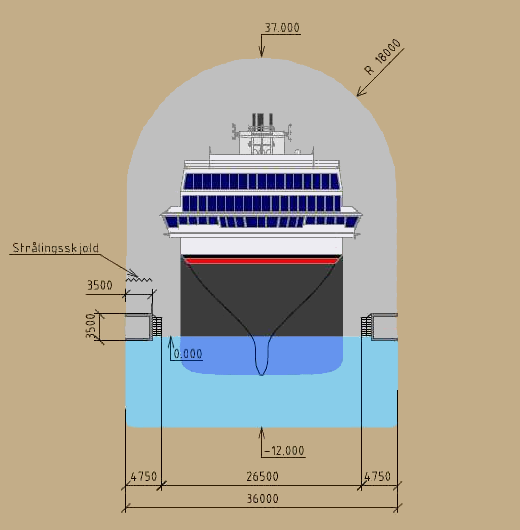
- Interactive map of Stad Ship Tunnel

Overview
- Official name: Stad skipstunnel
- Location: Norway
- Status: Planned

Operation
- Work began: 2027
- Opens: 2031
- Owner: Norwegian Coastal Administration

Technical
- Length: 1,800 m (5,900 ft)
- Tunnel clearance: 49 m (161 ft)
- Width: 37 m (121 ft)
- Boat-passable: 16 metres
- Depth below water: 12 metres

The Stad Ship Tunnel (Norwegian: Stad skipstunnel) is a planned canal and tunnel to bypass the Stad peninsula in Stad Municipality in Vestland county, Norway. The peninsula is one of the most exposed areas on the coast, without any outlying islands to protect it from the weather. The section has traditionally been one of the most dangerous along the coast of Norway.

When completed it will be the first full-size ship tunnel in the world. Construction is currently planned to begin in early 2027. AF Group was awarded the turnkey contract.

== Location ==
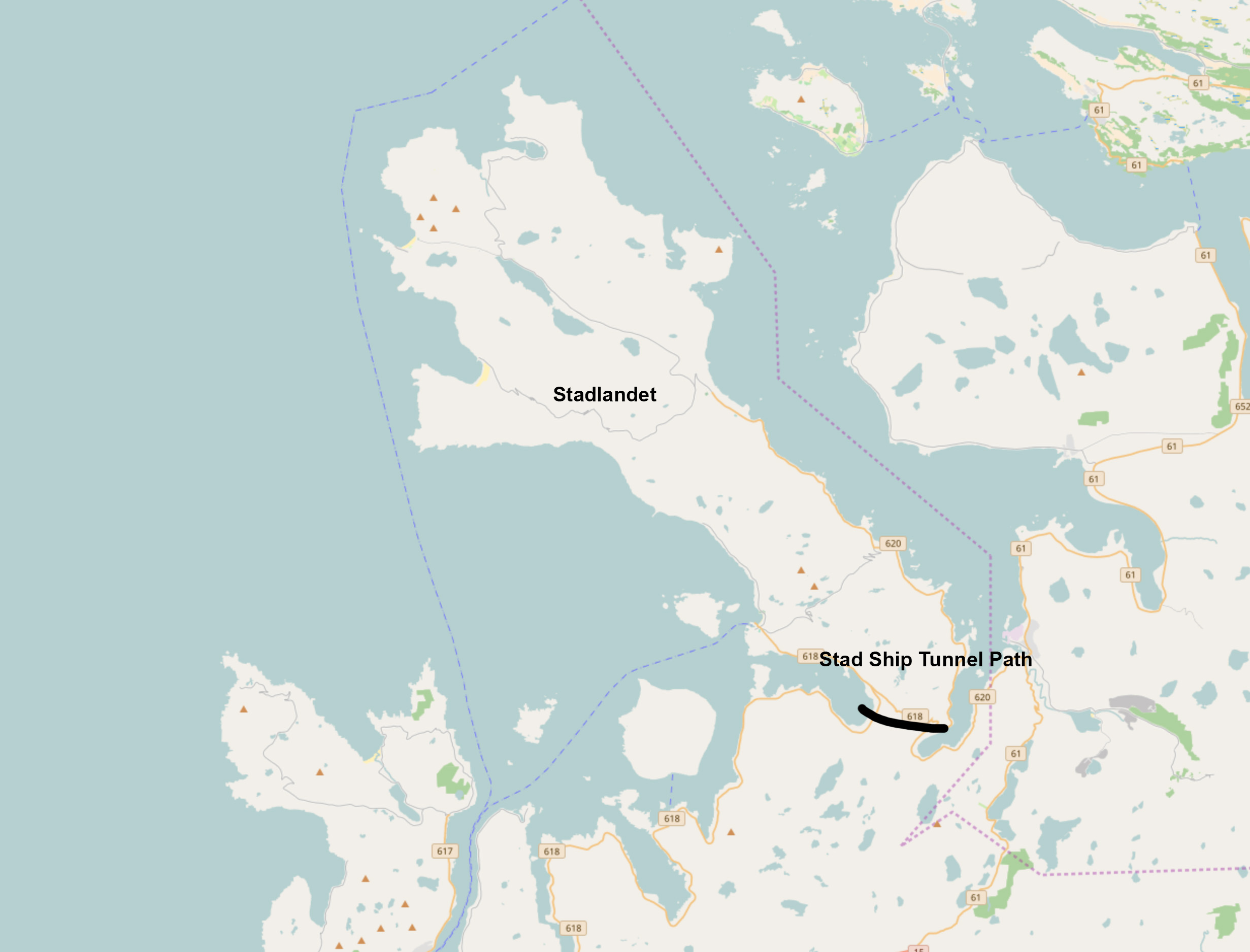
The path that the tunnel is planned to take.

The surrounding waters, known as the Stad Sea, is the most windswept part of the nation's coastline and is stormy around 100 days of the year, leading to ships often waiting days to pass through. Currents, created by the area marking the meeting point of the North Sea and the Norwegian Sea further complicate navigation: Since World War Two ended, 33 deaths have occurred in maritime accidents within the Stadhavet Sea. The official Visit Norway website has claimed Vikings would drag their boats over the peninsula to avoid crossing the dangerous patch of sea.

== Planning ==
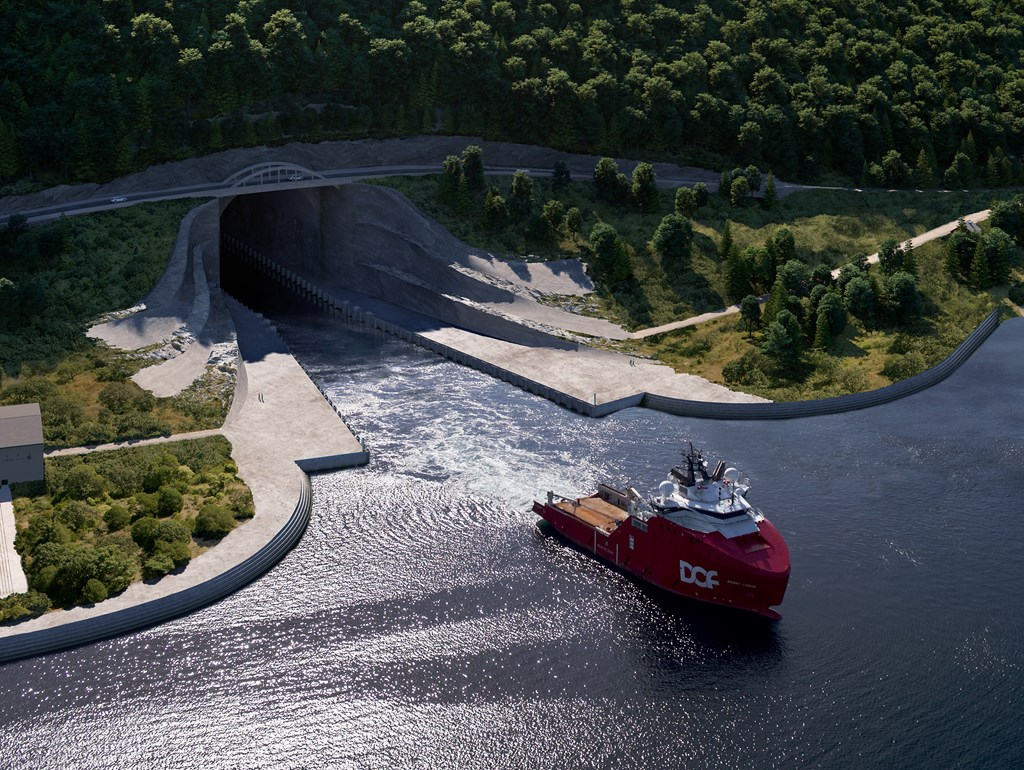
Concept image of the tunnel's portals

The first proposal was in an article in Nordre Bergenhus Amtstidende newspaper in 1874 (152 years ago), and shortly afterwards an article in the same newspaper proposed a railway tunnel across the peninsula. The latter would have allowed the boats to be raised onto wagons and to be hauled across, and would cost only half as much.

In 2011, a report by Det Norske Veritas and the Institute for Research in Economics and Business Administration for the Norwegian Coastal Administration concluded that a tunnel would not be economically feasible. It looked at two sizes, small and large, which would cost 1,264 million and 2,027 million kr respectively. The report concluded that the utility, including saved waiting costs, for shippers have a present value of 304 million and 314 million kr, respectively, and 67 million and 76 million kr in saved accident costs. A similar report from 2007 concluded that the tunnel would be economically feasible. The Coastal Administration stated that the differences were because of new and better data.

In 2013, the tunnel was included for the first time in the National Transport Plan. 1 billion kr was set aside for it in the budget. The tunnel will be 49 metres (161 ft) high and 36 metres (118 ft) wide, able to handle ships of up to 16 m wide and roughly 16,000 gross tonnage, large enough for the Hurtigruten coastal express ships. The water will be 12 metres (39 ft) deep in the tunnel. The tunnel will reduce journey lengths by 56 kilometres (35 mi).

Two routes were proposed: one 1,800 metres (5,900 ft) long from the Eide farm at the inner part of the Moldefjorden through the Mannseidet isthmus to the Kjødspollen (the inner part of the Vanylvsfjorden), the narrowest but innermost place of the peninsula. The other option is a slightly longer tunnel from the Skårbø farm to the Fløde farm through the central part of the peninsula. The second option has been selected for construction.

Knut Samset, a project management professor with at the Norwegian University of Science and Technology, criticised the decision to go ahead, claiming modern vessels could navigate the seas safely and that "cost-benefit analysis is negative".

== Bidding and prequalification ==
In March 2021, the Norwegian Ministry of Transport and Communications gave approval for preparations to begin, with the Norwegian Coastal Administration expecting construction to begin in 2022. Terje Andreassen, temporary project manager, stated that construction was expected to start in 2023 with an estimated completion in 2026. In 2023 a new cost estimate and budget overrun delayed the project.

According to Andreassen, tunnelling through a thick gneiss layer requires a "drill and blast" process, with materials delivered by sea, owing to inadequacy of local roads. A rock wall (or possibly cofferdams) will be used to keep the tunnel free of water during construction. Approximately three million cubic metres of rock require removal. The tunnel's entrances have been designed by Norwegian firm Snøhetta, with the rock walls left rough to blend into its surrounding landscape. Snøhetta's designs include walkways and a new road bridge to enhance views of ships passing in and out of the tunnel.

At an estimated speed limit of eight knots (15 km/h), vessels will take about ten minutes to pass through the tunnel. The tunnel will cater to smaller vessels including coastal ferries and other small passenger ships; most oceangoing cruise ships are too large to fit.

Negotiations for purchases of the land and identification of a principal contractor began in April 2021. After years of silence, the Norwegian Coastal Administration published the tender for the tunnel’s construction, with a pre-qualification deadline set for the end of January 2025. In February 2025, the Norwegian Coastal Administration reported that six construction contractors applied for prequalification. Four firms qualified to submit bids, while two Chinese consortia are out of the competition. The first bids would be submitted by June 2025 and then evaluated through several rounds of negotiations before the best offer is selected according to the award criteria.

== Status ==
The aim was to sign the contract in Autumn 2025 and start construction in 2026, provided the bids meet the project’s budget. Construction is expected to take about five years.

As of September 2025, doubts were raised as to the viability of the project due to projected budget overruns. At that point in time, it was uncertain whether it would commence as planned.

In October 2025, it became known that Jonas Gahr Støre’s government had ended work on the ship tunnel due to cost overruns. The cost estimate at that time was 9.4 billion NOK. Shortly afterward, a majority in the Norwegian Parliament decided that studies and negotiations on the price should nevertheless continue. The authorities approved NOK 150 million in the national budget in June 2026 for starting construction, and a total cost of NOK 8.6 billion.

In June 2026 it was announced that AF Group was awarded the contract for the turnkey construction for the tunnel. The contract has a value of approx. NOK 5.6 billion excl. VAT and was to be signed in August. The contractor will be responsible for both the design and construction of the tunnel. Construction is planned to start in early 2027.

== Opening ==
If construction begins as planned in early 2027 the opening should be during 2031. The Myklebust ship from Sagastad is planned to be the first ship through the tunnel once complete.
