= Stad (peninsula) =

Peninsula in Norway

Stad Stadlandet
- Peninsula
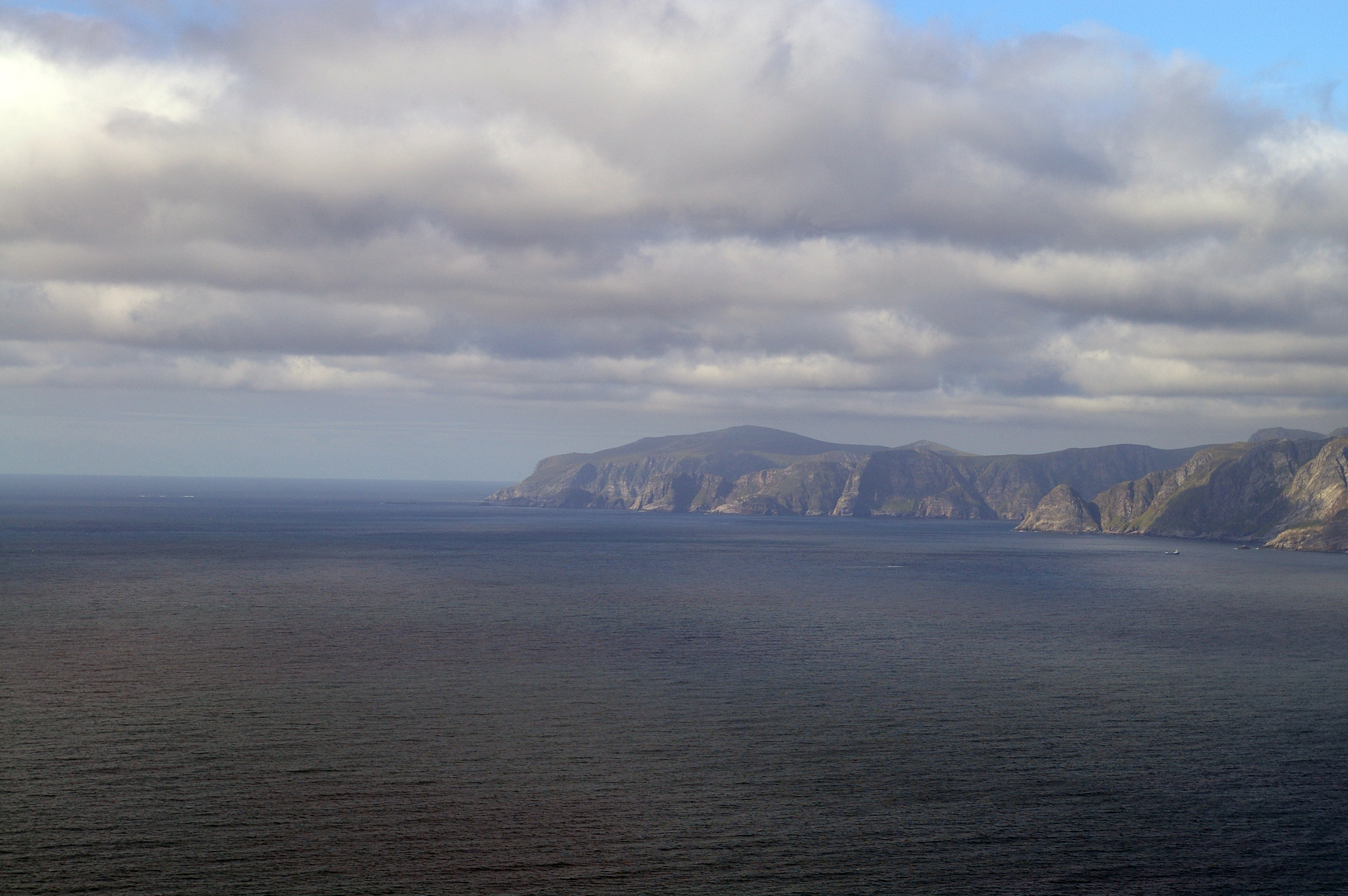
- View of the peninsula
- Interactive map of the peninsula
- Coordinates: 62°07′42″N 05°13′17″E
- Location: Vestland, Norway
- Offshore water bodies: Vanylvsfjorden, Sildagapet

Stad or Stadlandet is a peninsula in Stad Municipality in the northwestern part of the Nordfjord district in Vestland county in Norway. The peninsula is considered the dividing point between the Norwegian Sea to the north and the North Sea to the south. The name is sometimes also written as Stadt, Statt, or Stadlandet (not to be confused with the similar German word Stadt), because the Norwegian pronunciation of the d in this case is as a t. The name could be translated as "the land of places" or "the land of towns". Some of the larger villages on the peninsula include Ervik (northwestern tip), Borgundvåg and Leikanger (northeastern side), and the village of Selje (southwestern side).

== Geography ==
The peninsula is a 500-metre-high (1,600 ft) mountain plateau topped by the 645-metre-tall (2,116 ft) Tarvaldsegga peak. There are several lower valleys on the peninsula, but at the western end, the plateau plunges into the sea in a 497-metre-tall (1,631 ft) cliff at Kjerringa.

Stad Peninsula has a very harsh, windy climate. The highest wind speed in the country is often recorded at this promontory. Located between the cities of Bergen (to the south) and Ålesund (in Møre og Romsdal county to the north), this is the only peninsula of mainland between Stavanger and Honningsvåg that goes out into open sea without any archipelago that breaks waves. Most of the rest of the ship route from Bergen to Ålesund is protected by islands. The Svinøy Lighthouse (Svinøy fyr) is located 13 kilometres (8.1 mi) north of the peninsula on a small island in the Norwegian Sea.

Because of the harsh climate, the peninsula can be an obstacle for ship transport along the coast of Norway. It is one of the main obstacles preventing a fast-boat passenger route from Bergen to Ålesund, a distance of 310 kilometres (190 mi; 170 nmi). Current transportation from Bergen-Ålesund is by air via Oslo, by car (7–8 hours), by bus (9 hours) or by the Hurtigruten coastal ferry (13 hours).

== Ship tunnel ==
As far back as the 1870s there were plans for the construction of a ship tunnel. A pilot project was developed in 1985, and the development company founded the same year. Plans are currently well underway to build the Stad Ship Tunnel at the narrowest point connecting the Moldefjorden to the Kjødspollen (the innermost part of the Vanylvsfjorden) with capacity to take large ships such as the Hurtigruten vessels.

== Media gallery ==
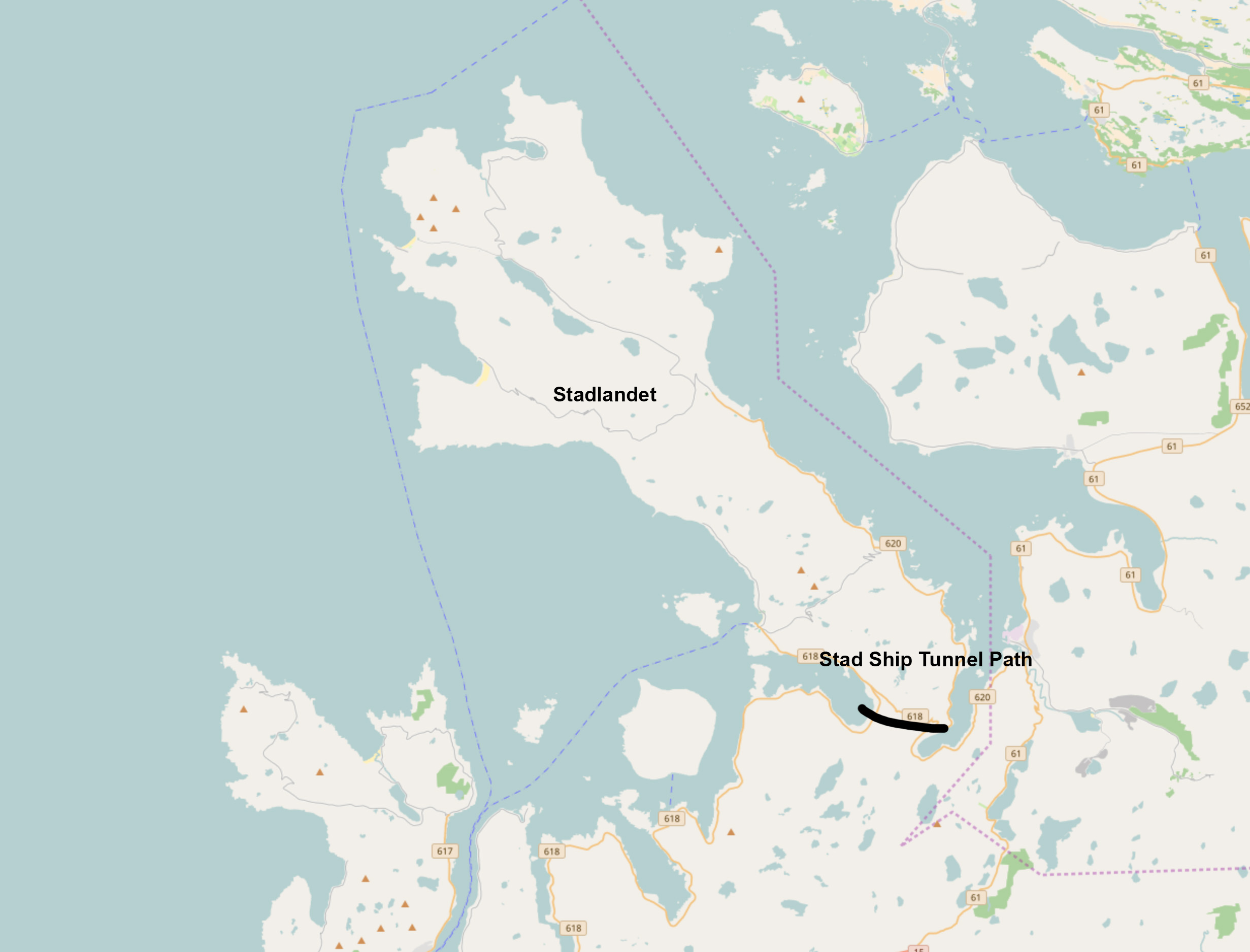
Proposed map of the Stad Ship Tunnel

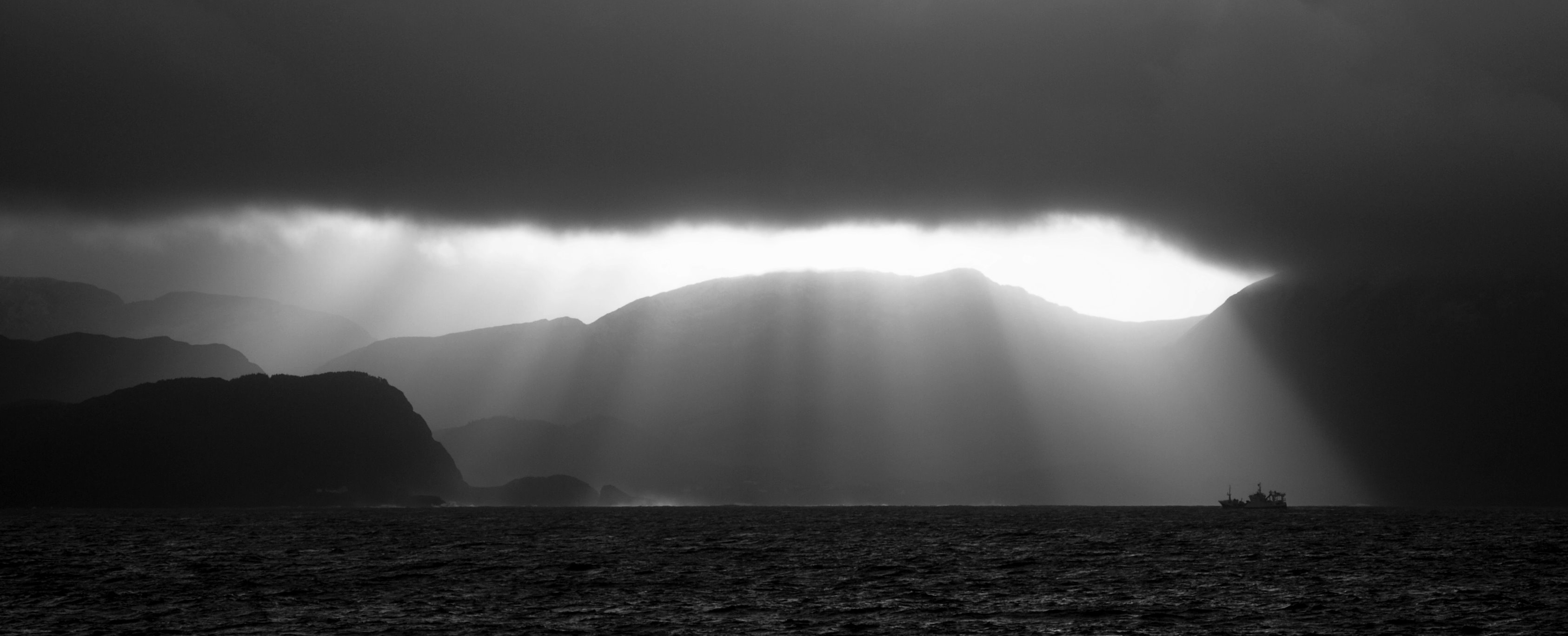
The sea at Indre Fure, in the Stad peninsula

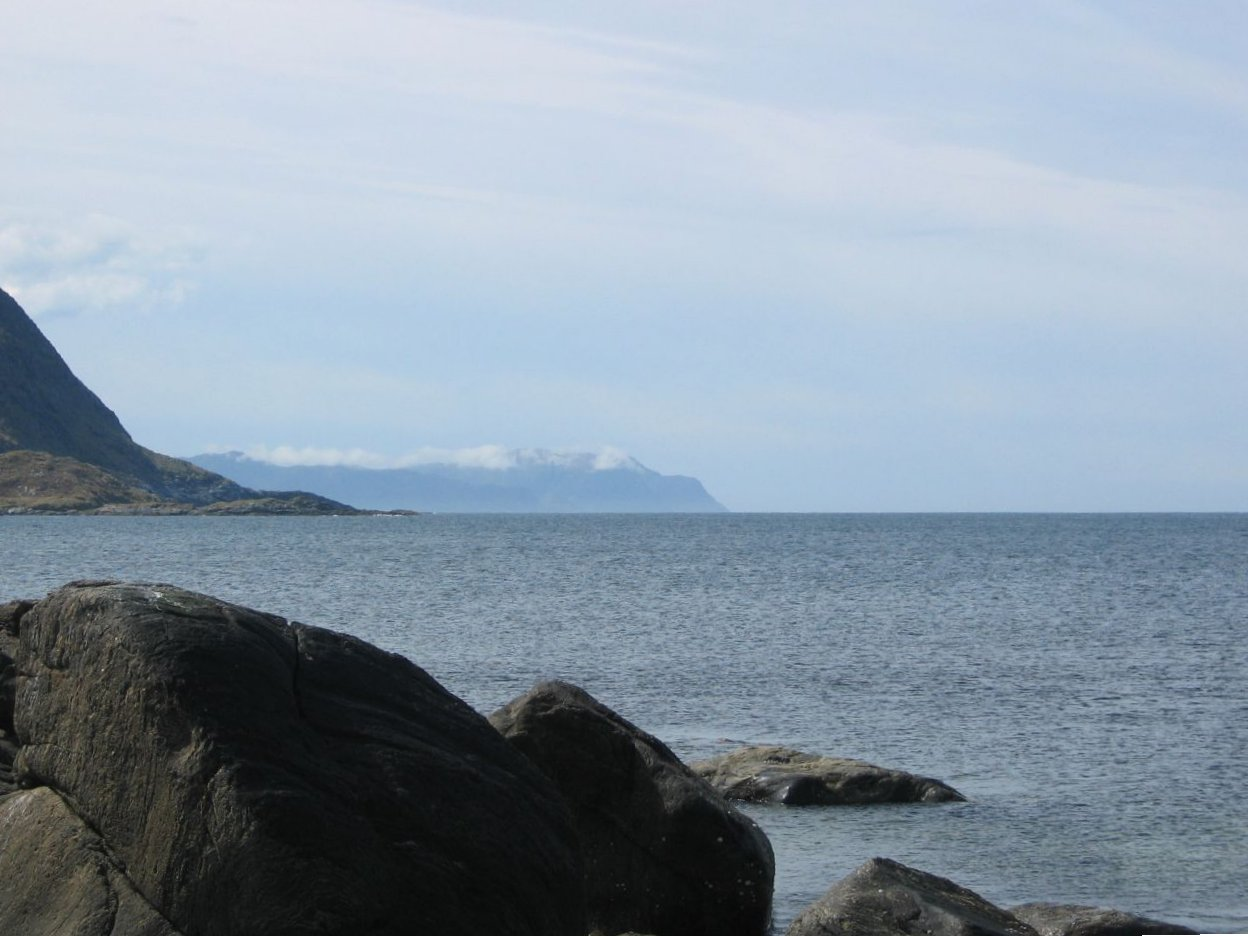
View of the cliffs at the end of Stad

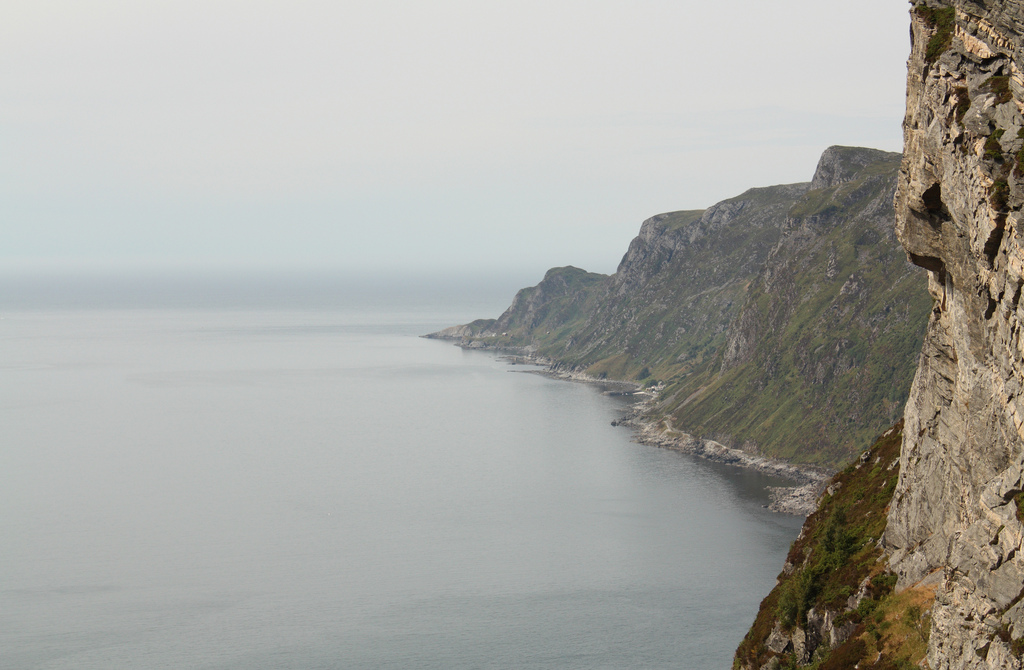
View of Fure in the distance

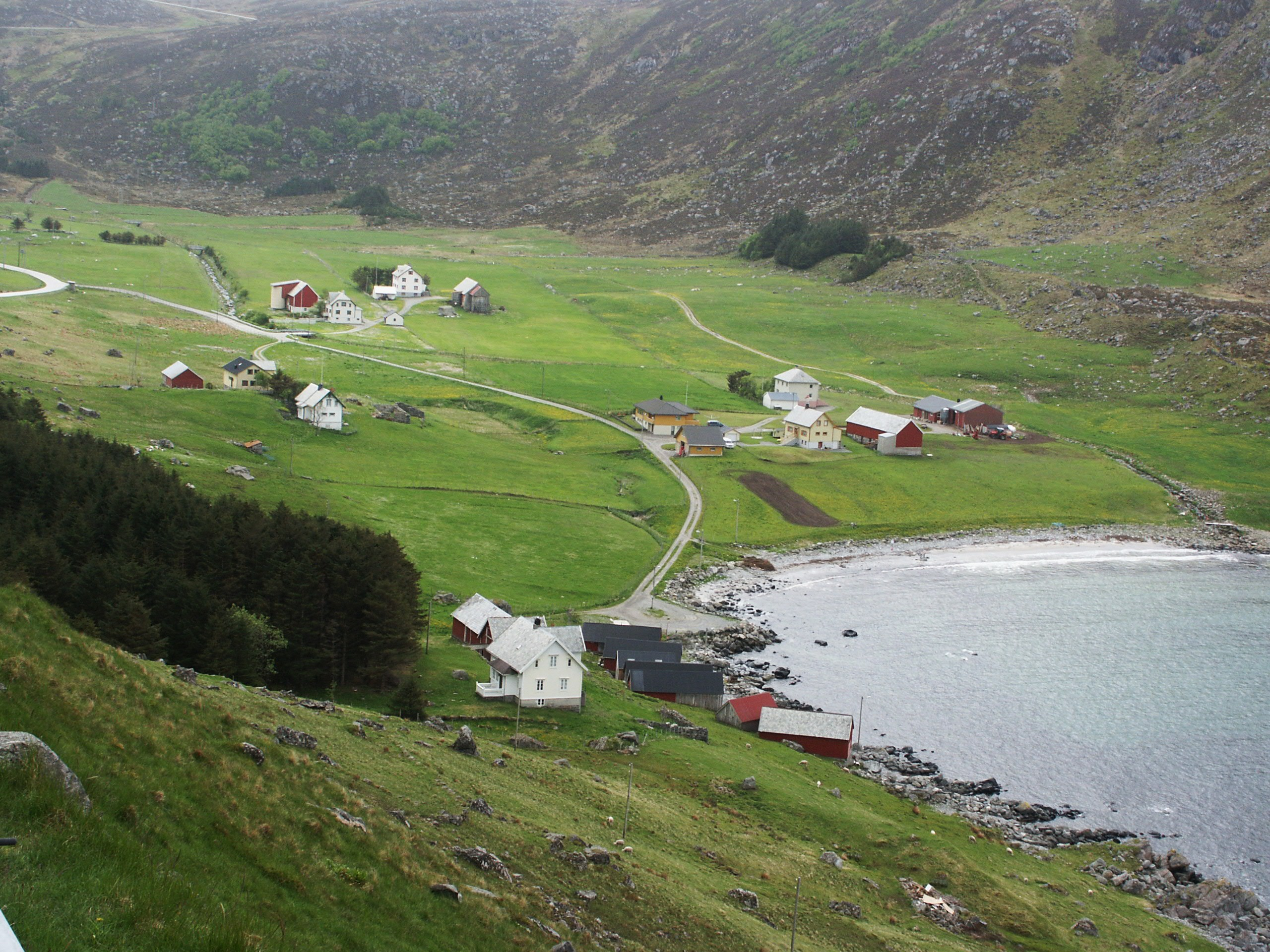
Årvik

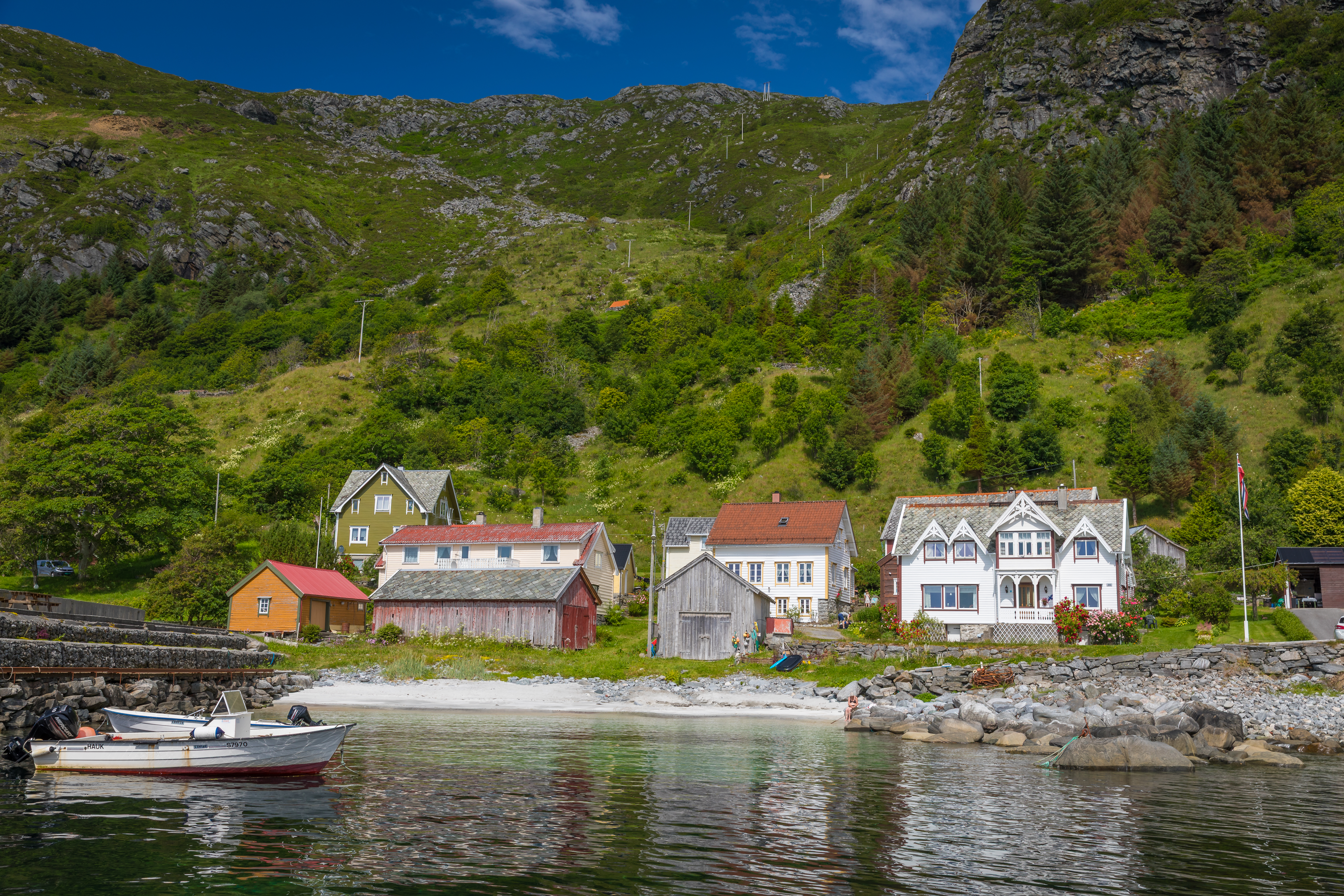
Indre Fure on the Stad peninsula.

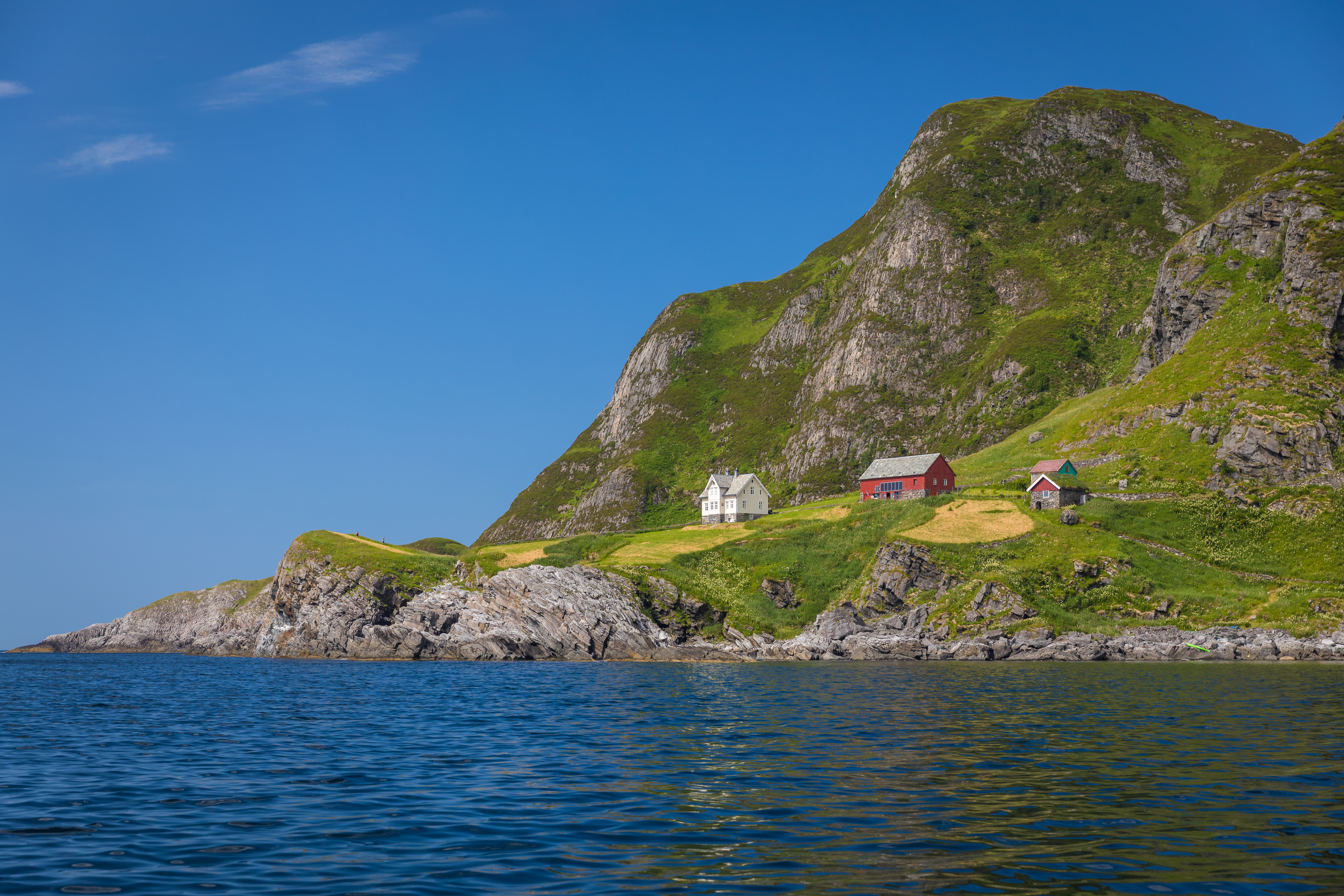
Ytre Fure on the Stad peninsula, viewed from the sea.

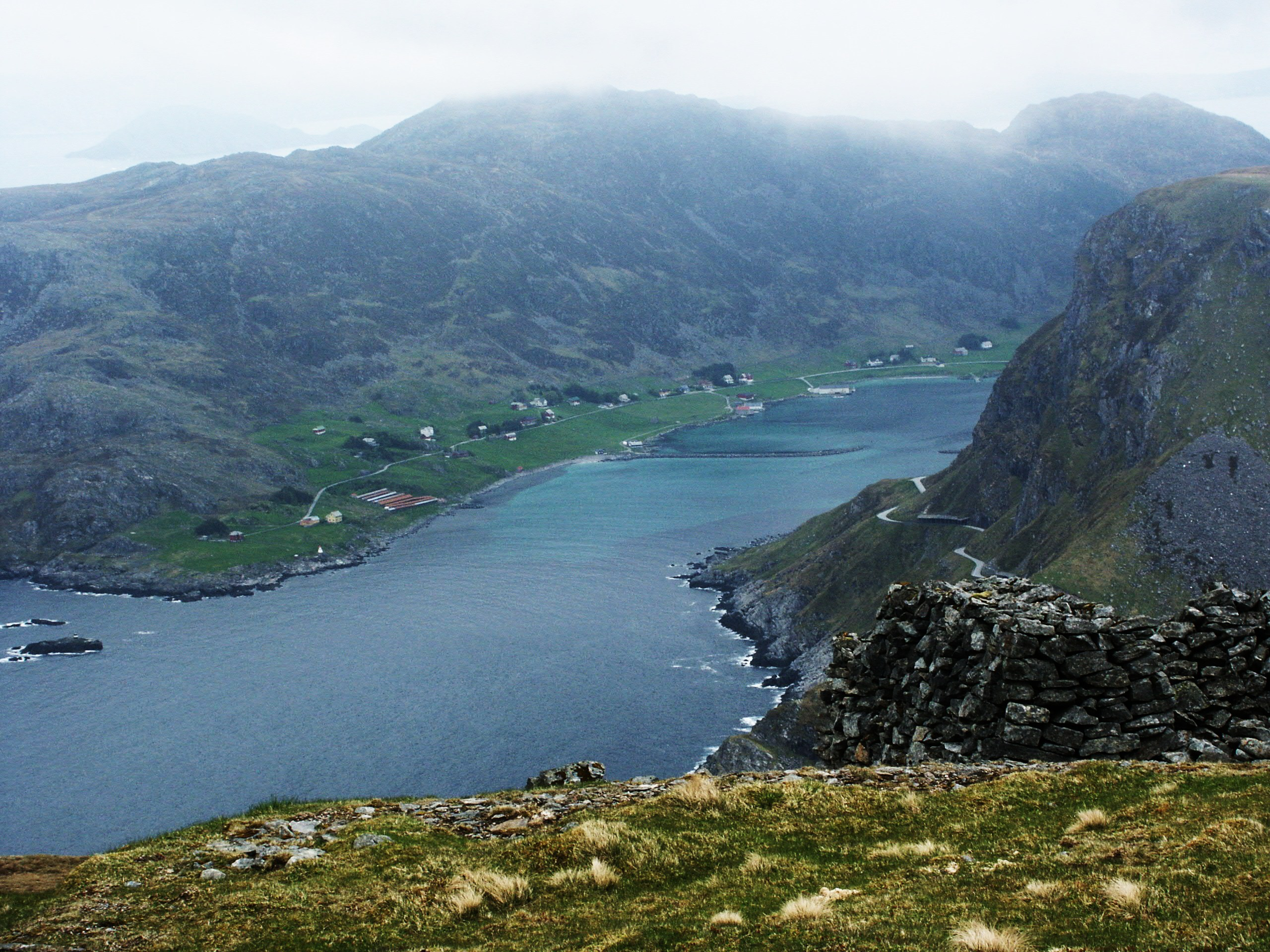
Honningsvåg

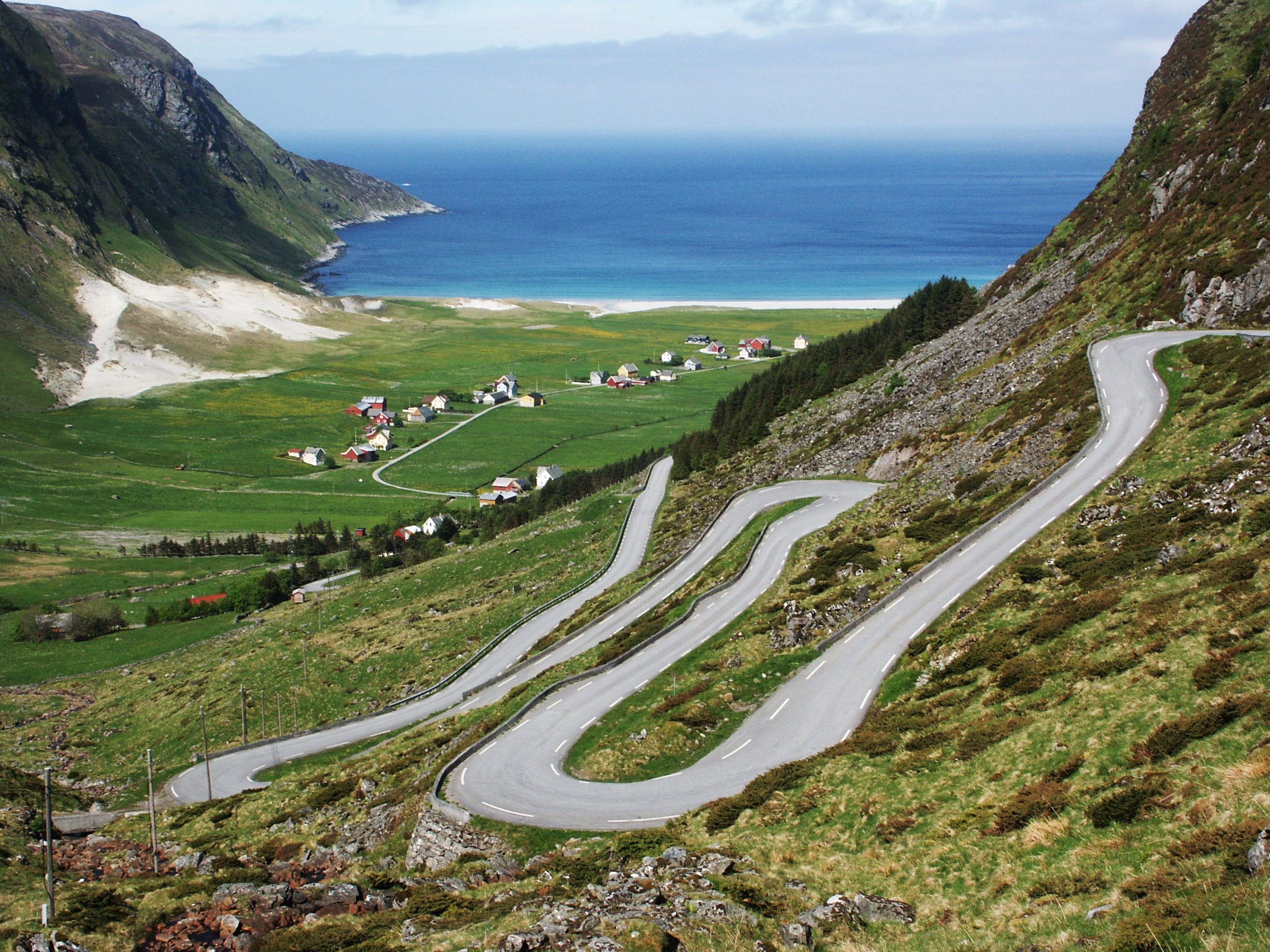
Hoddevik

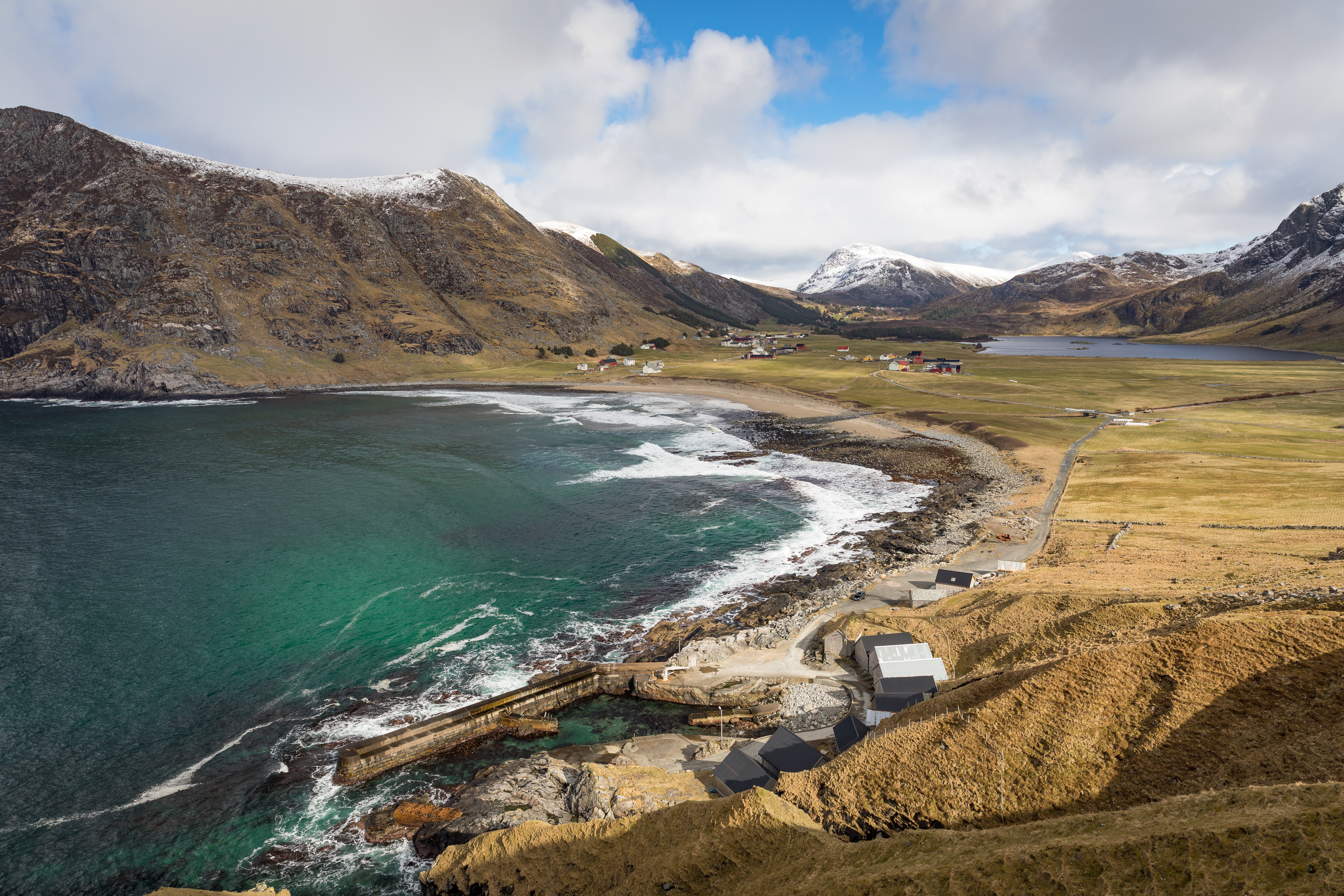
Ervik and Erviksanden on the Stad peninsula.

== See also ==
- Norwegian trench
