= Marie Lovise Widnes =

Norwegian poet and politician (1930–2021)

Marie Lovise Widnes (1 November 1930 – 19 November 2021) was a Norwegian poet, author, singer, composer, and politician.

== Political career ==
Widnes was born in Vanylven Municipality. She was elected to the Norwegian Parliament from Møre og Romsdal in 1989, but was not re-elected in 1993. She had previously served in the position of deputy representative for the Labour Party during the term 1954–1957.

Widnes was a member of the municipal council for Hareid Municipality in the periods 1971–1975, 1983–1987 and 1987–1989, and of Møre og Romsdal county council between 1975 and 1987, already for the Socialist Left Party.

== Discography ==
78-records - Philips:

Gangdøra (Elis Olsson/Marie Lovise Widnes)/Ei vise om ord (A.Berggren-T. Braarvig/Marie Lovise Widnes) - 14.08.1957
Framtidsdraumar (Kolbjørn Svendsen/Widnes)/Ein laurdagskveld (Trad./Widnes) - 14.-15.08.1957
Gniaren (Trad/Widnes)/Truls og Basse (Widnes)- 14.-15.08.57
Kjærleiksvegen (Widnes)/ Visa om bestemor (Trad ./ Widnes) - 15.08.1957
Kjærleik med forviklingar (A.Underdal/ Widnes)/Ei vise om kjærleik og dårskap (Trad. /Widnes) Ca 15.08.1957
Klagesongen (Trad. / Widnes)/Kvardagsfilosofi (Trad./ Widnes) - Ca 15.08.1957
Holebuarvise (Widnes)/ Guden og jenta (Widnes) - 1964

EP-records (Philips)

Gangdøra/Ei vise om ord /Framtidsdraumar/Ein laurdagskveld.
Kjærleiksvegen /Visa om bestemor/Kjærleik med forviklingar/Ei vise om kjærleik og dårskap

Compilations - EP records
Widnes: Truls og Basse/Alf Prøysen:Gutteklubben Varg/Magne Ove Larsen:Kom alle sammen bli med../Karsten Byhring: Guttas kjøkkenvise

Compilations - LP records
Solid norsk gull (1974) (Philips) (Contains Gangdøra)
Lirekassen nr 26 (Contains Gangdøra)

== Books ==
- Gangdøra og andre viser, Tiden Norsk Forlag, Oslo 1958
- Kvardagsdikt, Forum for kristne sosialitar, Oslo 1979
- Idsø, Liv Marit og Marie Lovise Widnes: Marie Lovise Widnes, tusenkunstner og kvardagsmenneskje, Det Norske Samlaget, Oslo 1986
- Fragler - finst dei?, own publishing, Hareid 1993
- Målet hennar mor, own publishing, Hareid 2001?
- Frå alle mine strengar - Dikt i samling, own publishing, Hareid 2003
