= Åheim =

Village in Vanylven Municipality, Norway

- Village
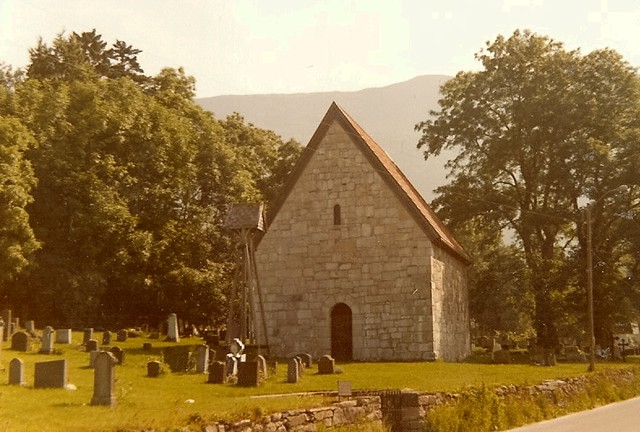
- View of the historic Saint Jetmund Church in Åheim
- Interactive map of Åheim
- Location within Møre og Romsdal Location within Norway
- Coordinates: 62.0359°N 5.5309°E
- Country: Norway
- Region: Western Norway
- County: Møre og Romsdal
- District: Sunnmøre
- Municipality: Vanylven Municipality
- Elevation: 5 m (16 ft)
- Time zone: UTC+01:00 (CET)
  - Summer (DST): UTC+02:00 (CEST)
- Post Code: 6146 Åheim

Åheim is a village in Vanylven Municipality in Møre og Romsdal county, Norway. The village is located along the shore of the inner part of the Vanylvsfjorden. The Åheimselva river runs through the village from the lake Gusdalsvatnet to the fjord.

The village is one of the larger urban areas in the municipality, mostly due to the local olivine mining operations. The historic Saint Jetmund Church is located near the mouth of the river in Åheim. There is also a school in Åheim that serves the students from this part of the municipality.

Åheimselva, Gusdalselva, Gusdalsvanet, Almklovdalen

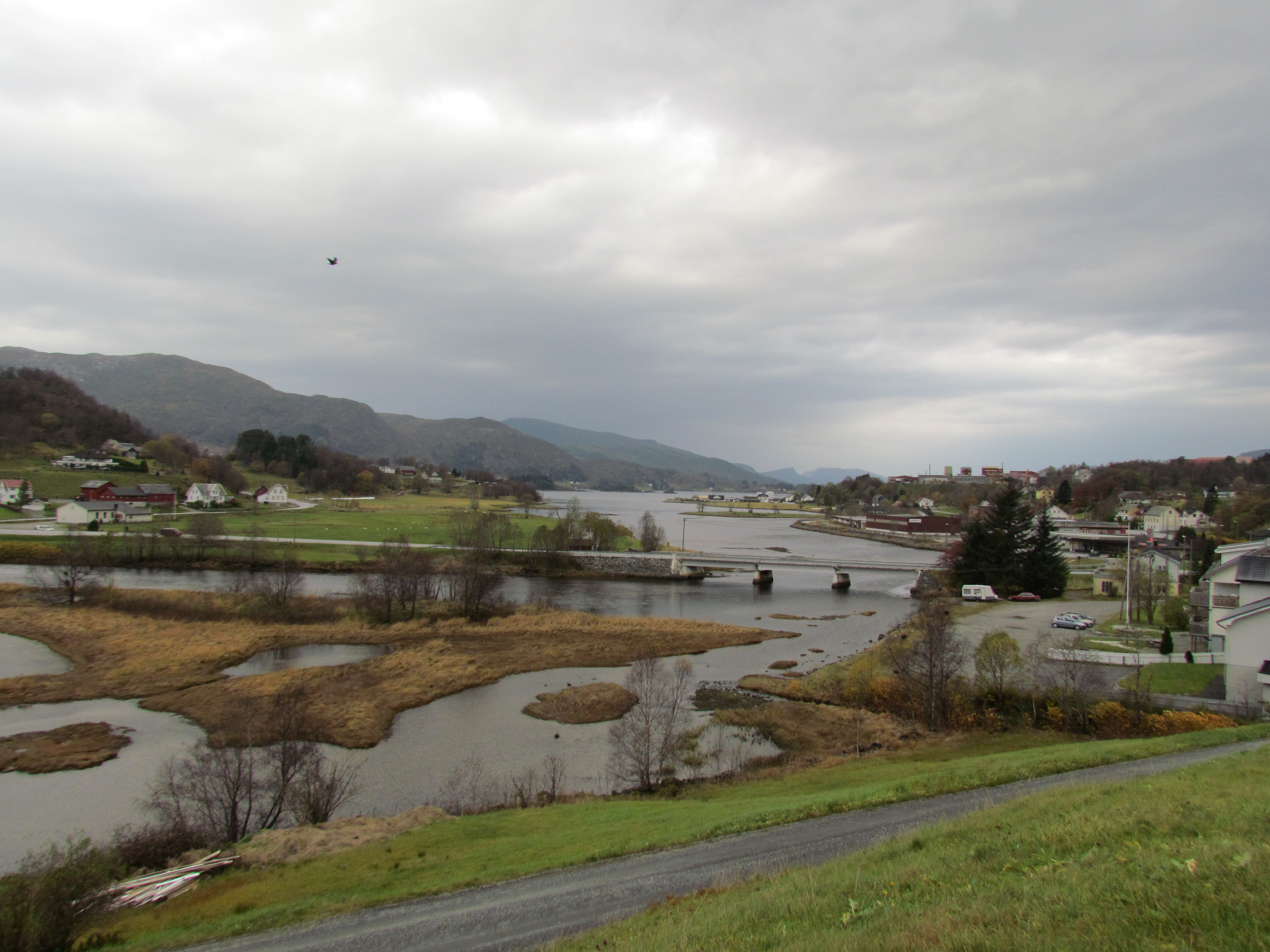
Åheimselva mouth is in Åheim.

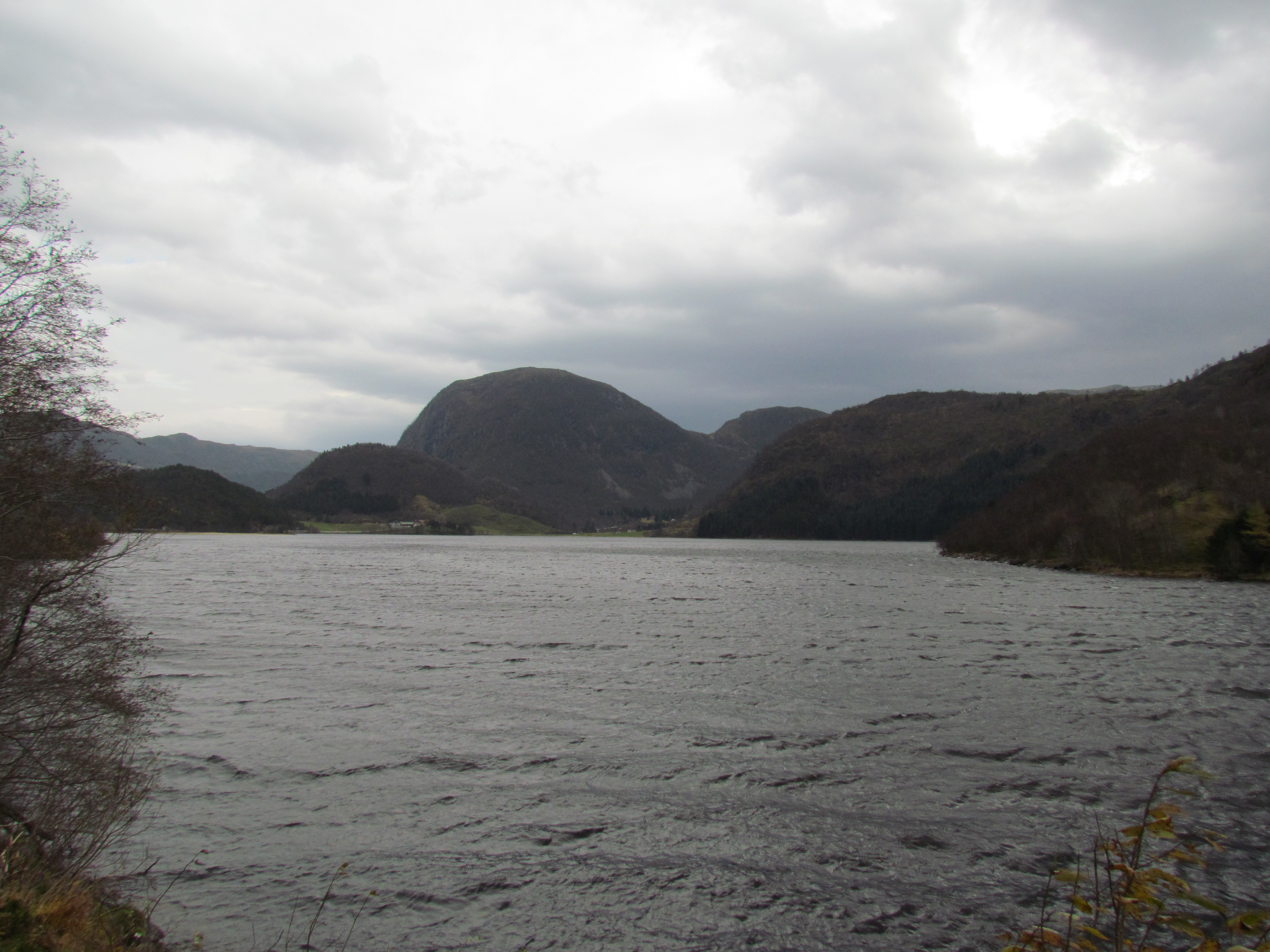
Åheimselva flows out the Gusdalsvanet from.

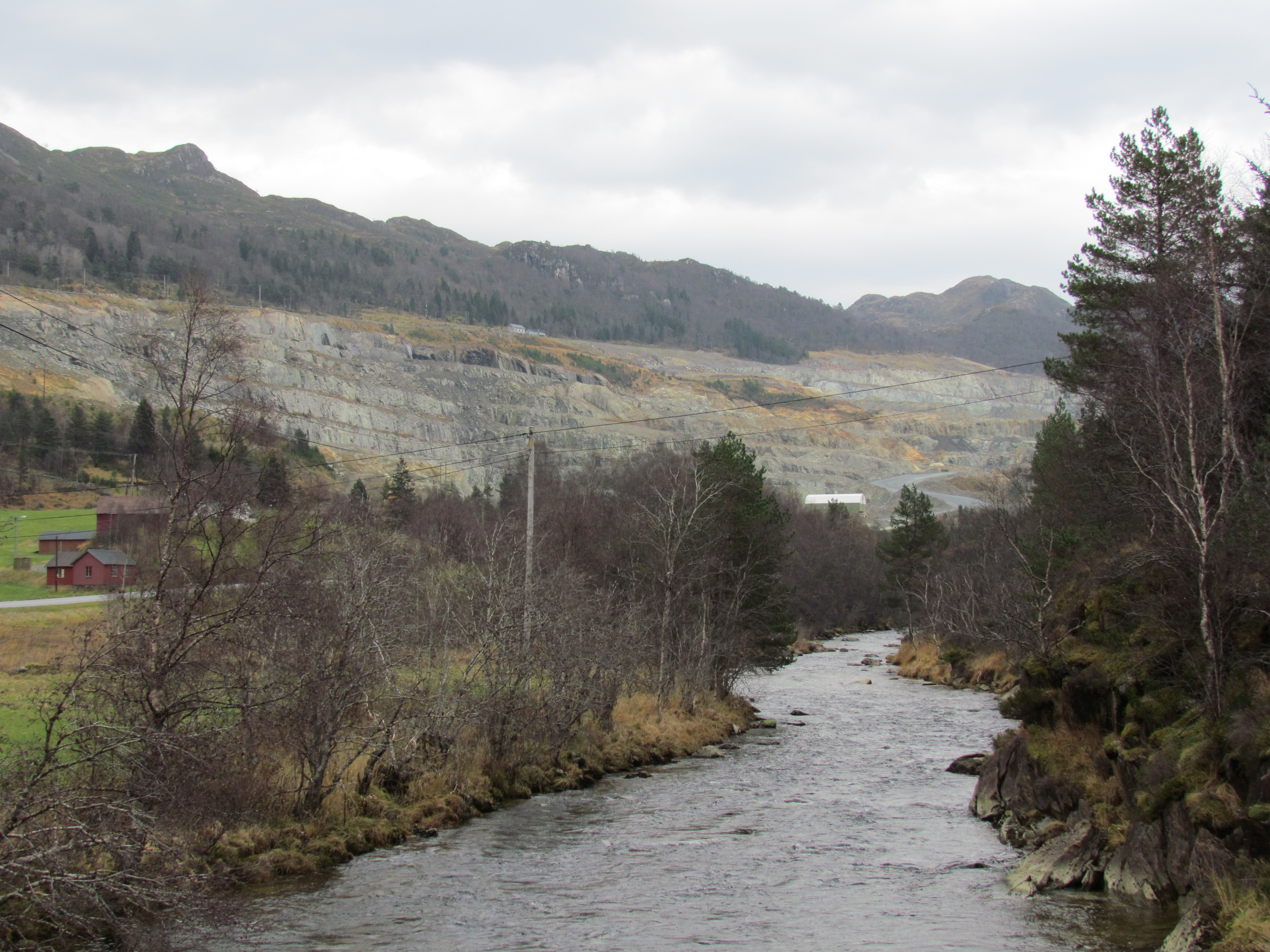
The Gusdalselva flows into the Gusdalsvanet.

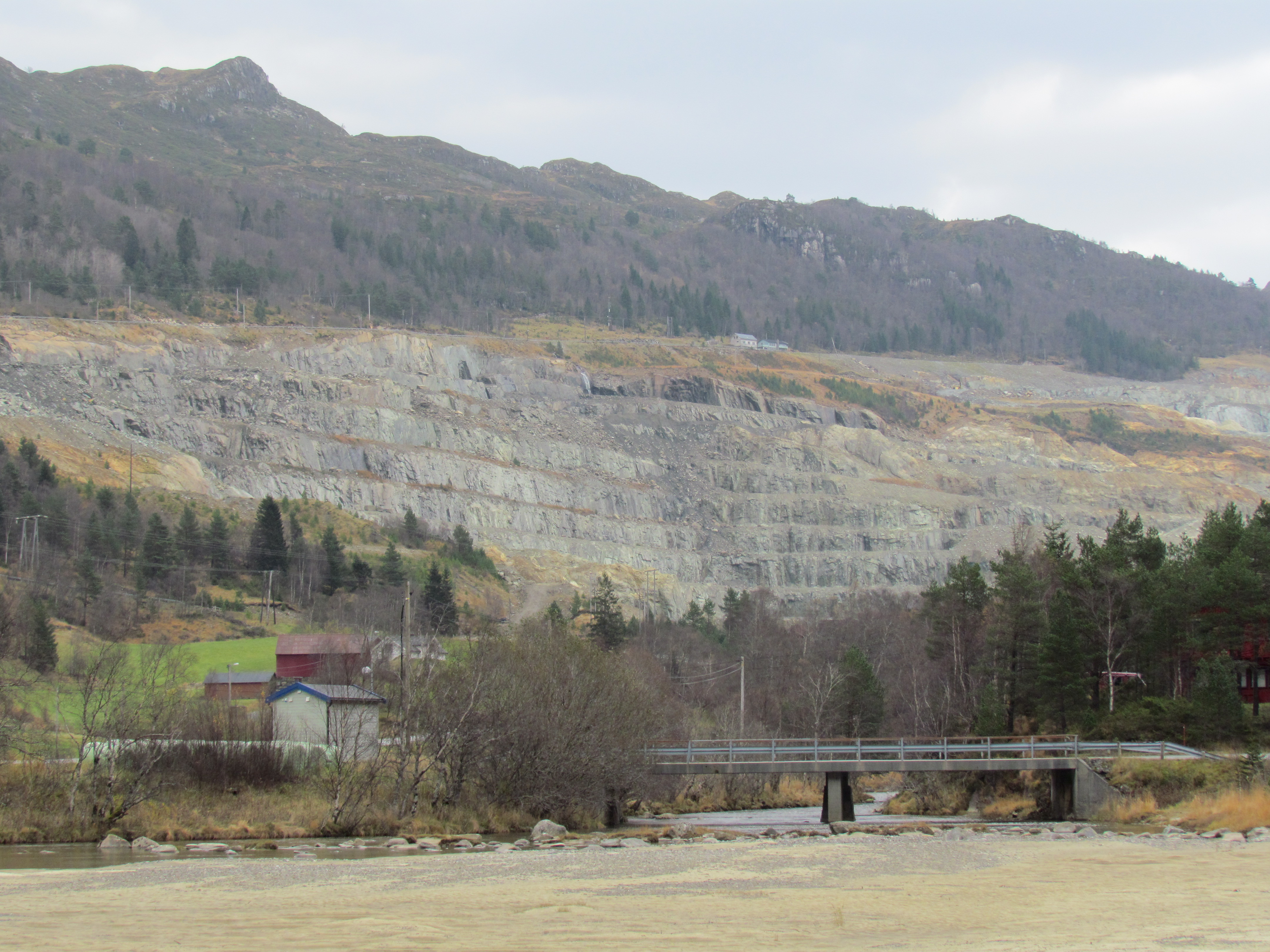
The Gusdalselva mouth is in the Gusdalsvanet.

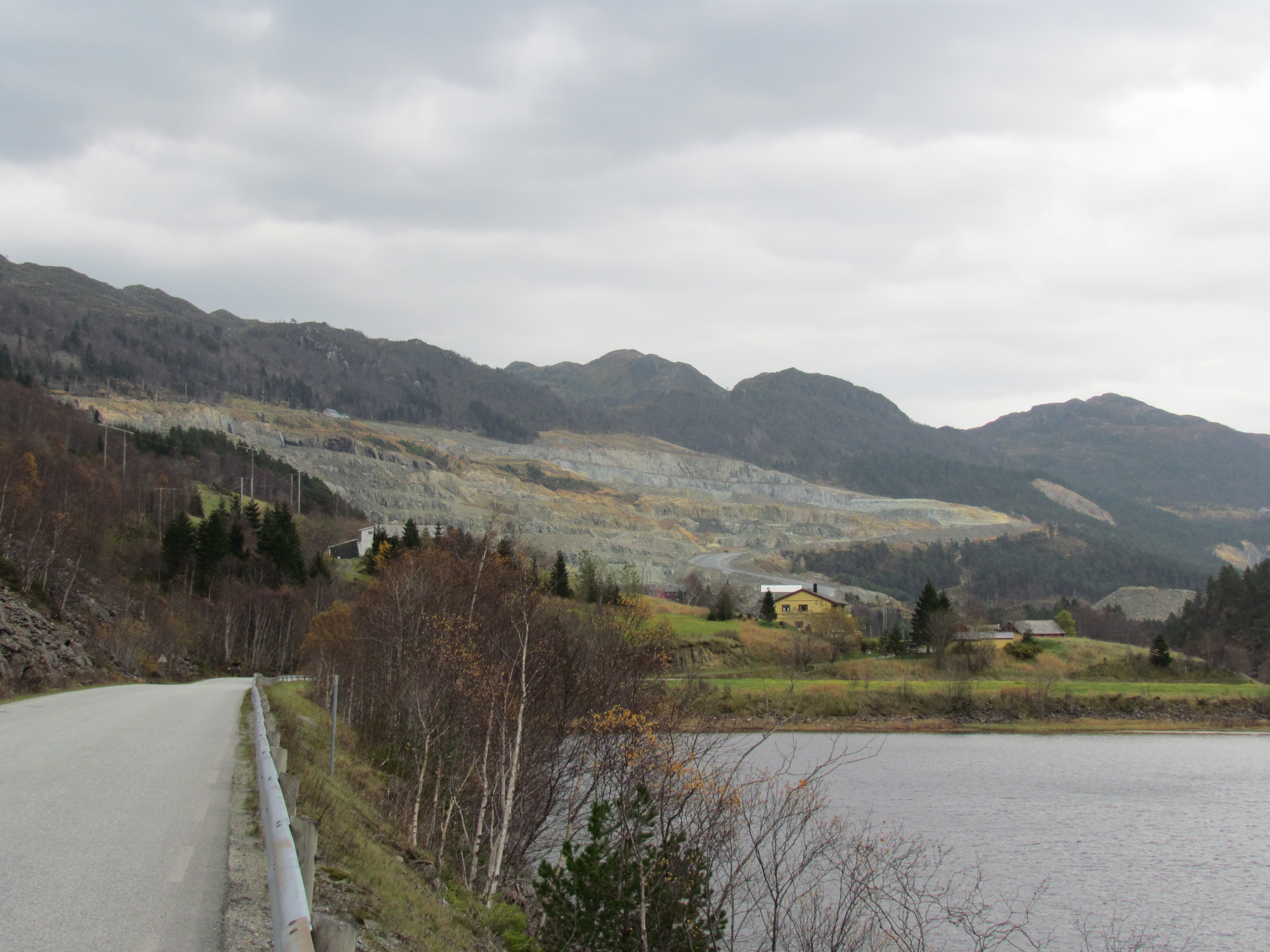
The olivine quarry is located in the Almklovdalen massif.

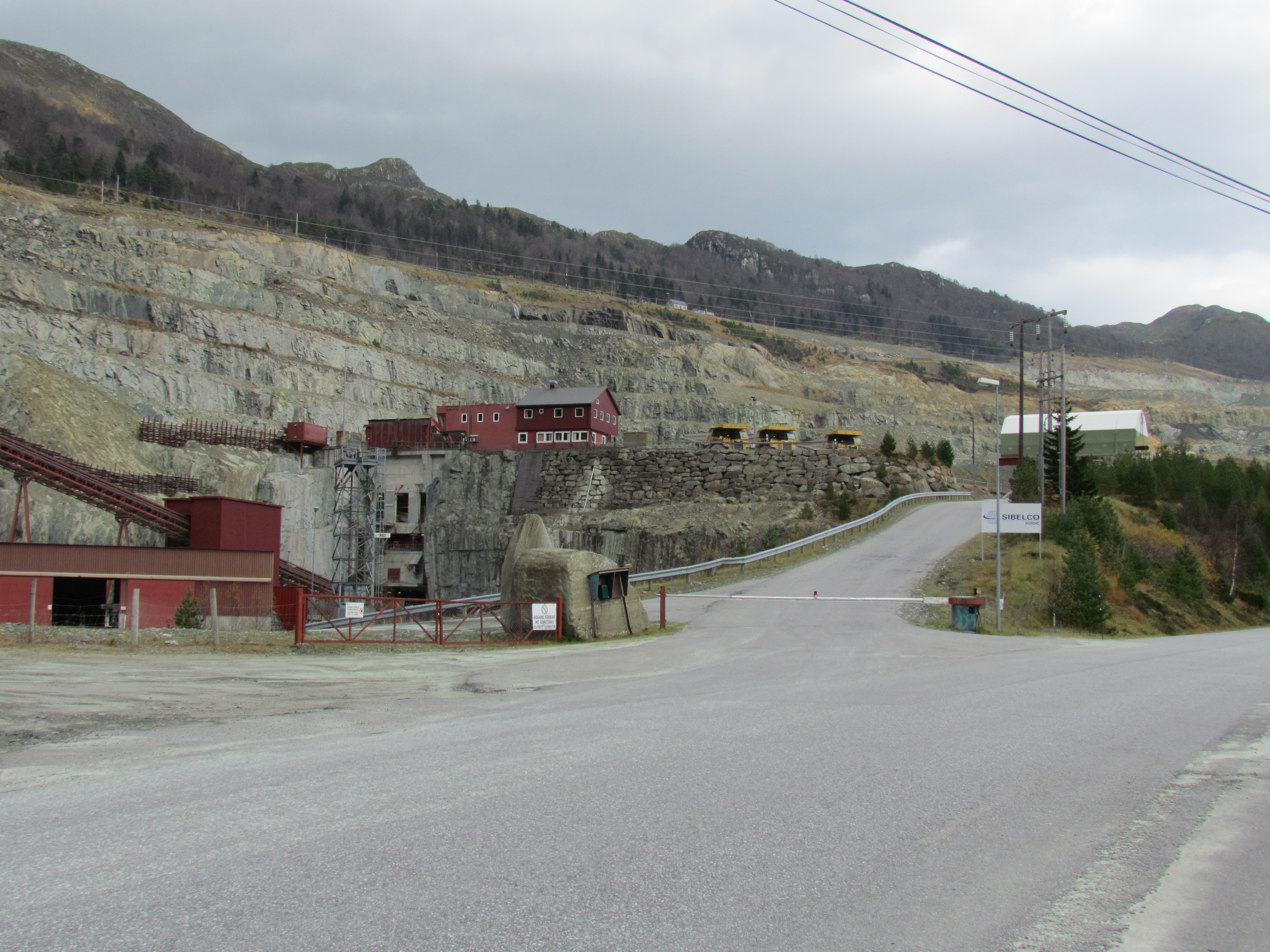
The Sibelco Nordic olivine quarry is in the Almklovdalen massif.
