= Vanylvsfjorden =

Fjord in Western Norway

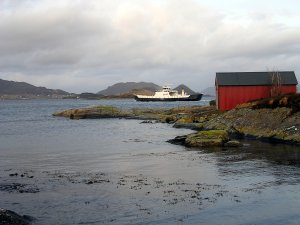
- View of the outer part of the fjord
- Interactive map of the fjord
- Location: Møre og Romsdal and Vestland, Norway
- Coordinates: 62.0944°N 5.5630°E
- Type: Fjord
- Basin countries: Norway
- Max. length: 30 kilometres (19 mi)
- Max. width: 5 kilometres (3.1 mi)
- Max. depth: −252 metres (−827 ft)

Vanylvsfjorden is a fjord in western Norway, on the border of Vestland and Møre og Romsdal counties. The 30-kilometre (19 mi) long fjord runs between the mainland of Vanylven Municipality and the Stad peninsula of Stad Municipality, with the islands of Sande Municipality lying in the mouth of the fjord. The inner part of the fjord branches into the Syltefjorden and Kjødepollen. The deepest part of the fjord reaches about 252 metres (827 ft) below sea level, just northeast of the village of Borgundvåg.

There are settlements all around the shoreline of the fjord and on some of the islands at the mouth of the fjord. Some of the larger, more notable villages on the shore of the fjord include Fiskåbygd, Sylte, Slagnes, Åheim (all in Vanylven Municipality) and Leikanger and Borgundvåg (in Stad Municipality).

The Haugsholmen Lighthouse is located in the outer part of the fjord. The Stad Ship Tunnel has its northern entrance in the Vanylvsfjorden.

== See also ==
- List of Norwegian fjords
