= Åram Church =

Church in Møre og Romsdal, Norway

- Åram kyrkje
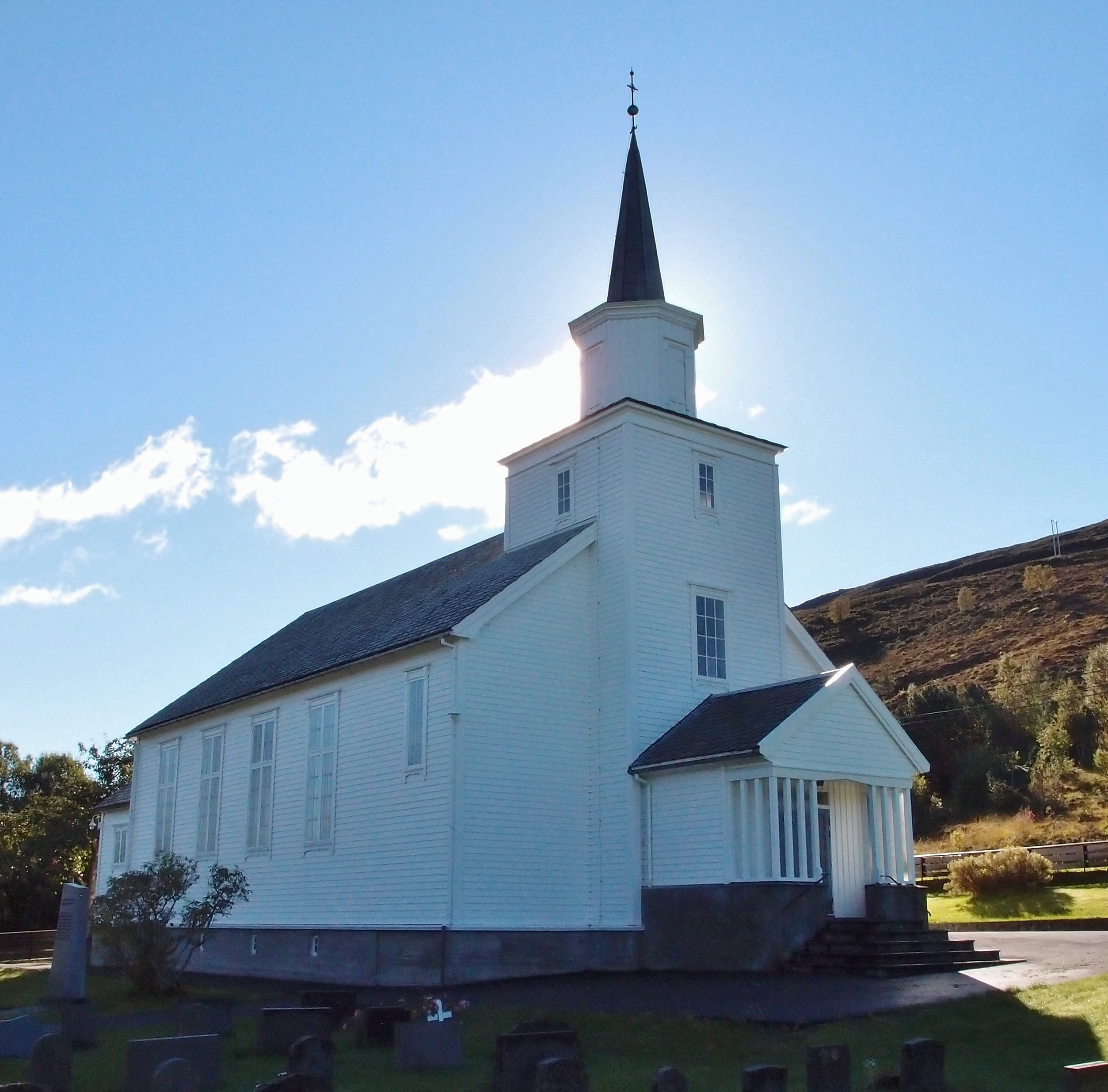
- View of the church
- Åram Church
- 62°11′53″N 5°29′27″E
- Location: Vanylven Municipality, Møre og Romsdal
- Country: Norway
- Denomination: Church of Norway
- Churchmanship: Evangelical Lutheran

History
- Status: Parish church
- Founded: 1927
- Consecrated: 20 January 1927

Architecture
- Functional status: Active
- Architect: Sivert Storegjerde
- Architectural type: Long church
- Completed: 1927 (99 years ago)

Specifications
- Capacity: 300
- Materials: Wood

Administration
- Diocese: Møre bispedømme
- Deanery: Søre Sunnmøre prosti
- Parish: Åram
- Norwegian Cultural Heritage Site
- Type: Church
- Status: Not protected
- ID: 85973

Åram Church (Norwegian: Åram kyrkje) is a parish church of the Church of Norway in Vanylven Municipality in Møre og Romsdal county, Norway. It is located in the village of Åram in the northern part of the municipality. It is the church for the Åram parish which is part of the Søre Sunnmøre prosti (deanery) in the Diocese of Møre (since 2002; prior to that time it was part of the Sande parish). The white, wooden church was built in a long church design in 1927 using plans drawn up by the architect Sivert Storegjerde. The church seats about 300 people.

== History ==
The Åram area was historically part of the Sande Church parish. In the 1910s, the parish decided to build the new Gursken Church on the island of Gurskøya and divide the parish into two. The new church was built in 1918. This led the people of Åram on the mainland to demand their own church so they didn't have to boat across a fjord to attend church services. After a lot of discussions, the parish was divided into three, and it was decided to build a new church at Åram. The new Åram Church was designed and built by the builder Sivert Storegjerde. It was consecrated on 20 January 1927. In 1964, the building was enlarged by adding bathrooms near the main entrance. On 1 January 2002, the mainland Åram portion of Sande Municipality was transferred to the neighboring Vanylven Municipality. The church was also transferred to the Vanylven parish council at the same time.

== Media gallery ==
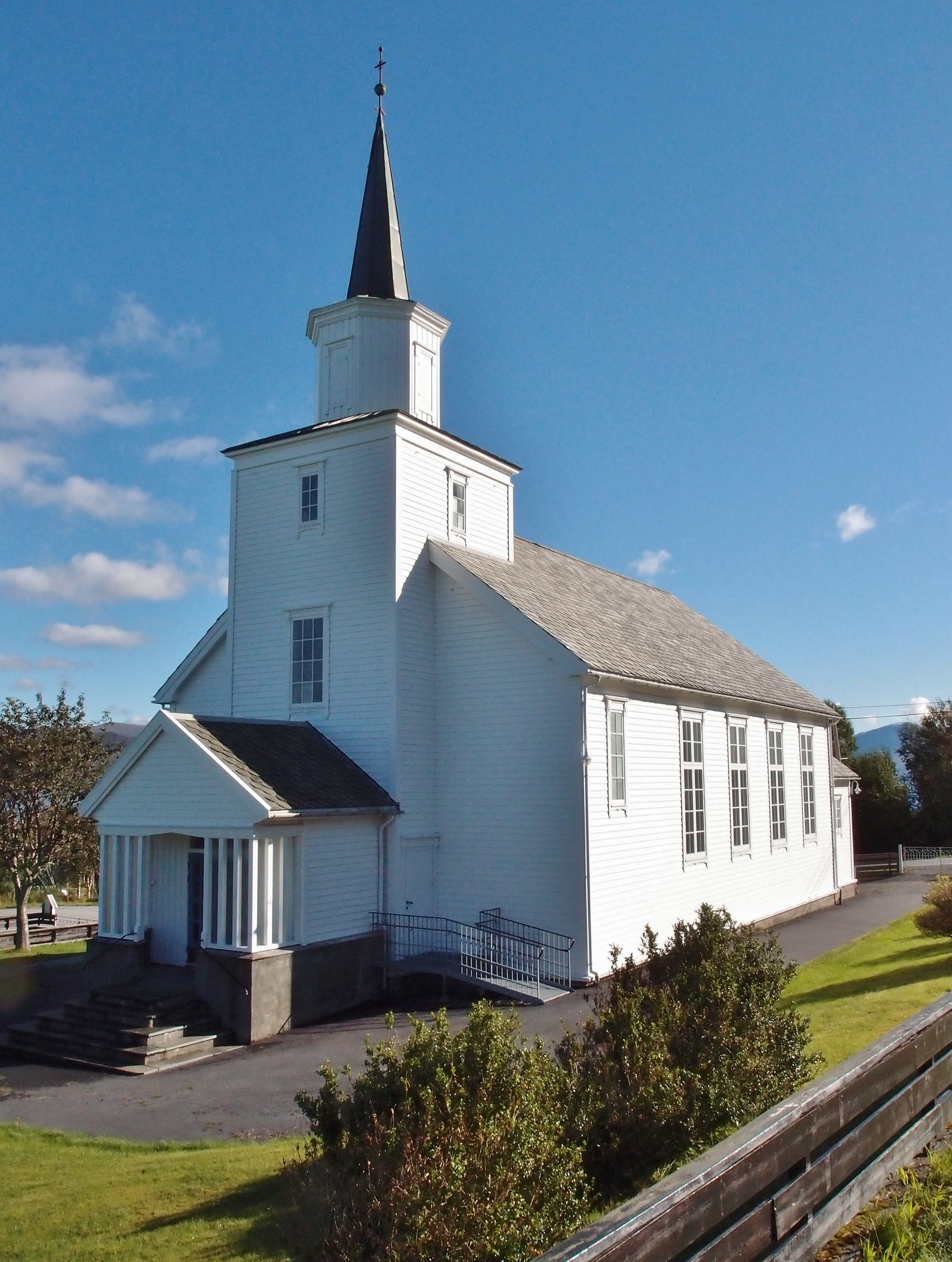

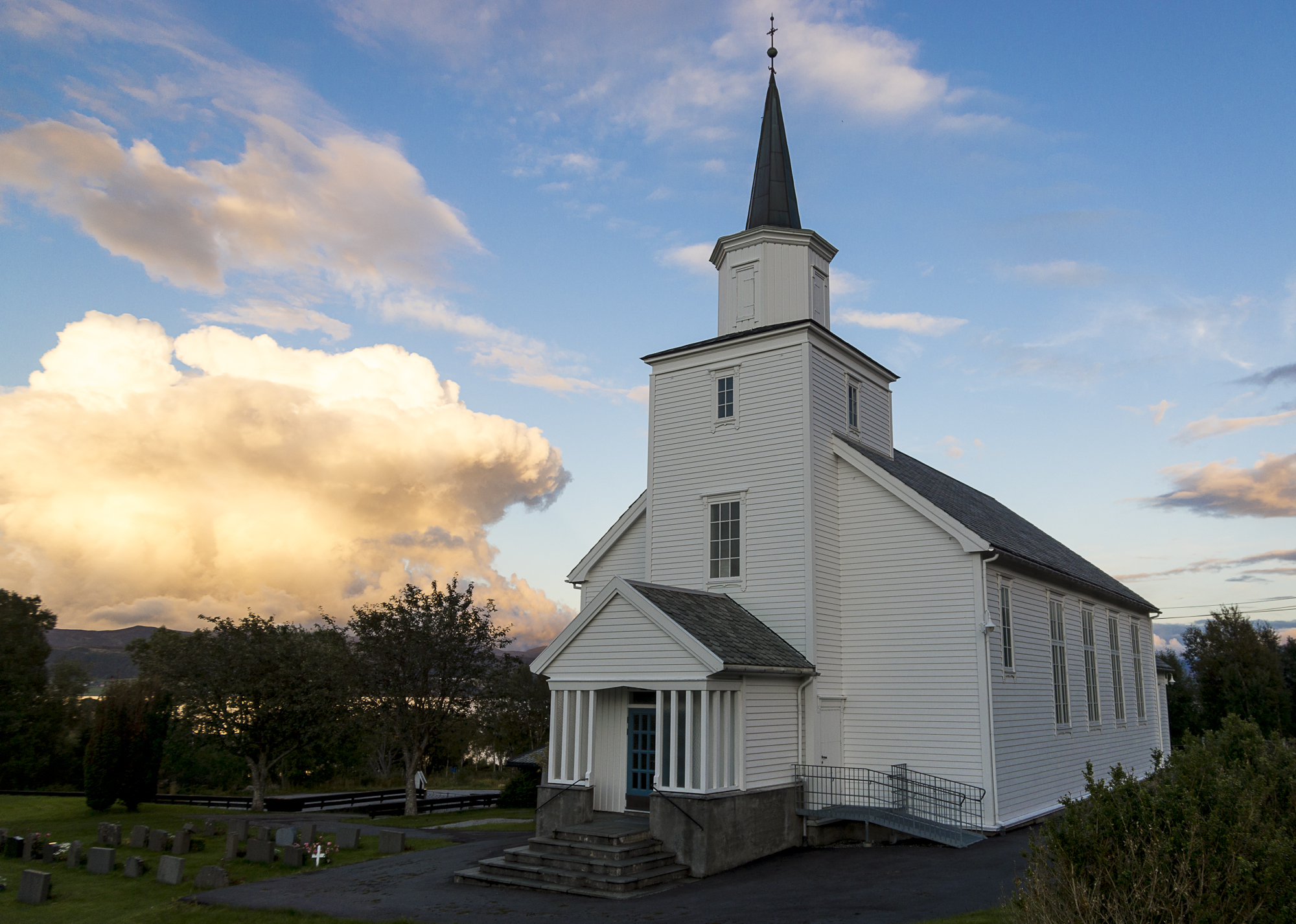

== See also ==
- List of churches in Møre
