= Sandsøya, Møre og Romsdal =

Island in Møre og Romsdal, Norway

Sandsøya
- Interactive map of Sandsøya

Geography
- Location: Møre og Romsdal, Norway
- Coordinates: 62.2550°N 5.4285°E
- Area: 11.4 km^{2} (4.4 sq mi)
- Length: 5.6 km (3.48 mi)
- Width: 3.5 km (2.17 mi)
- Highest elevation: 369 m (1211 ft)
- Highest point: Rinden

Administration
- Norway
- County: Møre og Romsdal
- Municipality: Sande Municipality

Sandsøya is an island in Sande Municipality in Møre og Romsdal county, Norway.

The 11.4-square-kilometre (4.4 sq mi) island lies west of the island of Gurskøya, north of the island of Voksa, and northeast of the island of Kvamsøya. The main village on the island is Sandshamn on the eastern shore. The Sande Church is located on the southern shore.

The island is connected to the island of Voksa to the south by a 2.5-kilometre-long (1.6 mi) bridge/road/causeway. There is a ferry connection from Voksa to the mainland, to Kvamsøya, and to the village of Larsnes on Gurskøya island.

== See also ==
- List of islands of Norway
