= Åram =

Village in Vanylven Municipality, Norway

- Village
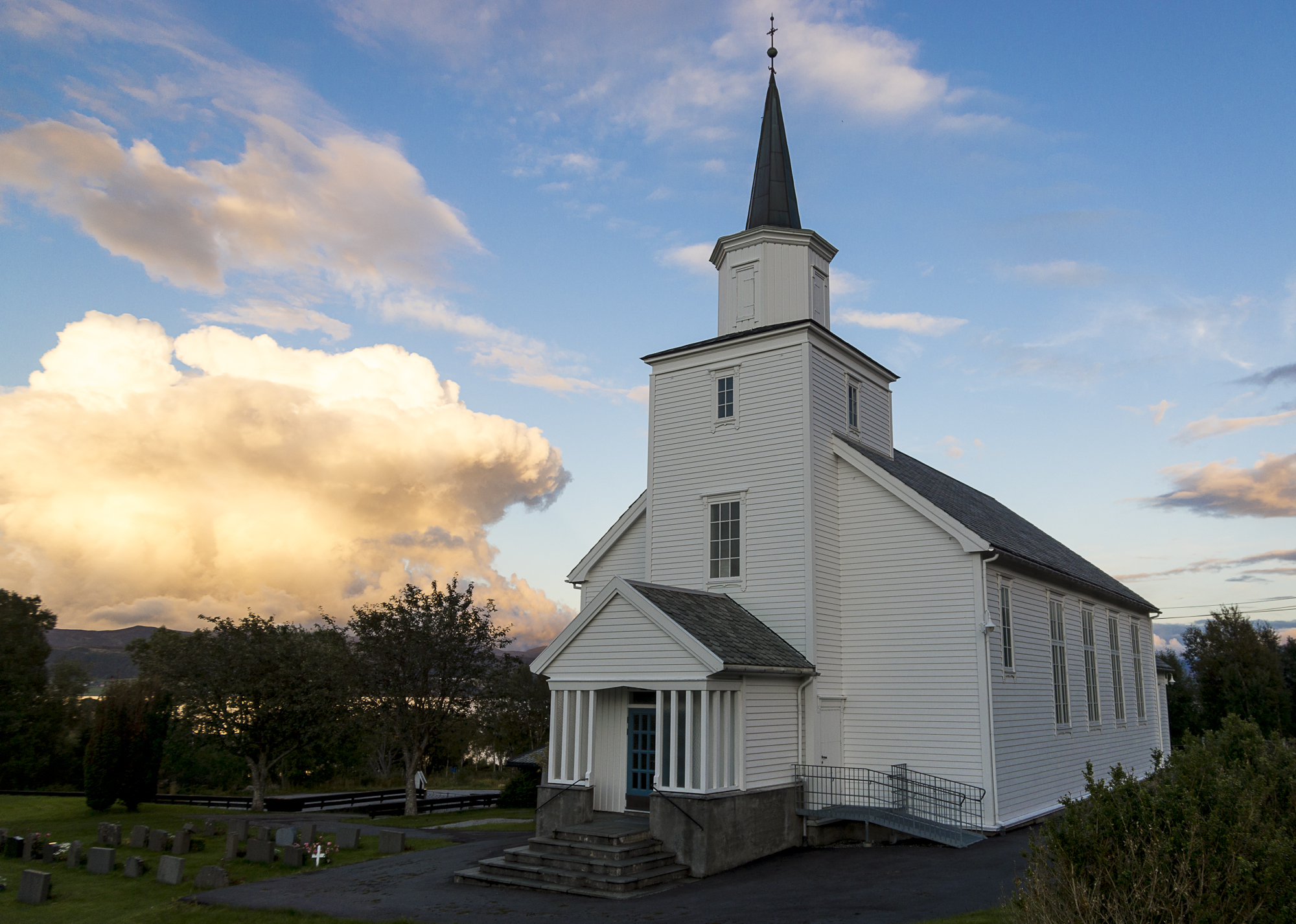
- View of the village church
- Interactive map of Åram
- Location within Møre og Romsdal Location within Norway
- Coordinates: 62.1918°N 5.5018°E
- Country: Norway
- Region: Western Norway
- County: Møre og Romsdal
- District: Sunnmøre
- Municipality: Vanylven Municipality
- Elevation: 13 m (43 ft)
- Time zone: UTC+01:00 (CET)
  - Summer (DST): UTC+02:00 (CEST)
- Post Code: 6149 Åram

Åram is a village in Vanylven Municipality in Møre og Romsdal county, Norway. The village is located on the mainland, about 12 kilometres (7.5 mi) straight north of the municipal centre of Fiskåbygd. The village has a ferry quay with regular connections to the nearby islands of Kvamsøya, Voksa, and Gurskøya in the neighboring Sande Municipality. Åram Church is located in the village.

Åram and all of the mainland for about 5 kilometres (3.1 mi) in all directions was formerly a part of Sande Municipality from 1 January 1838 until 1 January 2002 when it was administratively transferred to Vanylven Municipality.

The local football club is Åram/Vankam FK.
