= MS Fridtjof Nansen =

Norwegian cruise ship

Fridtjof Nansen
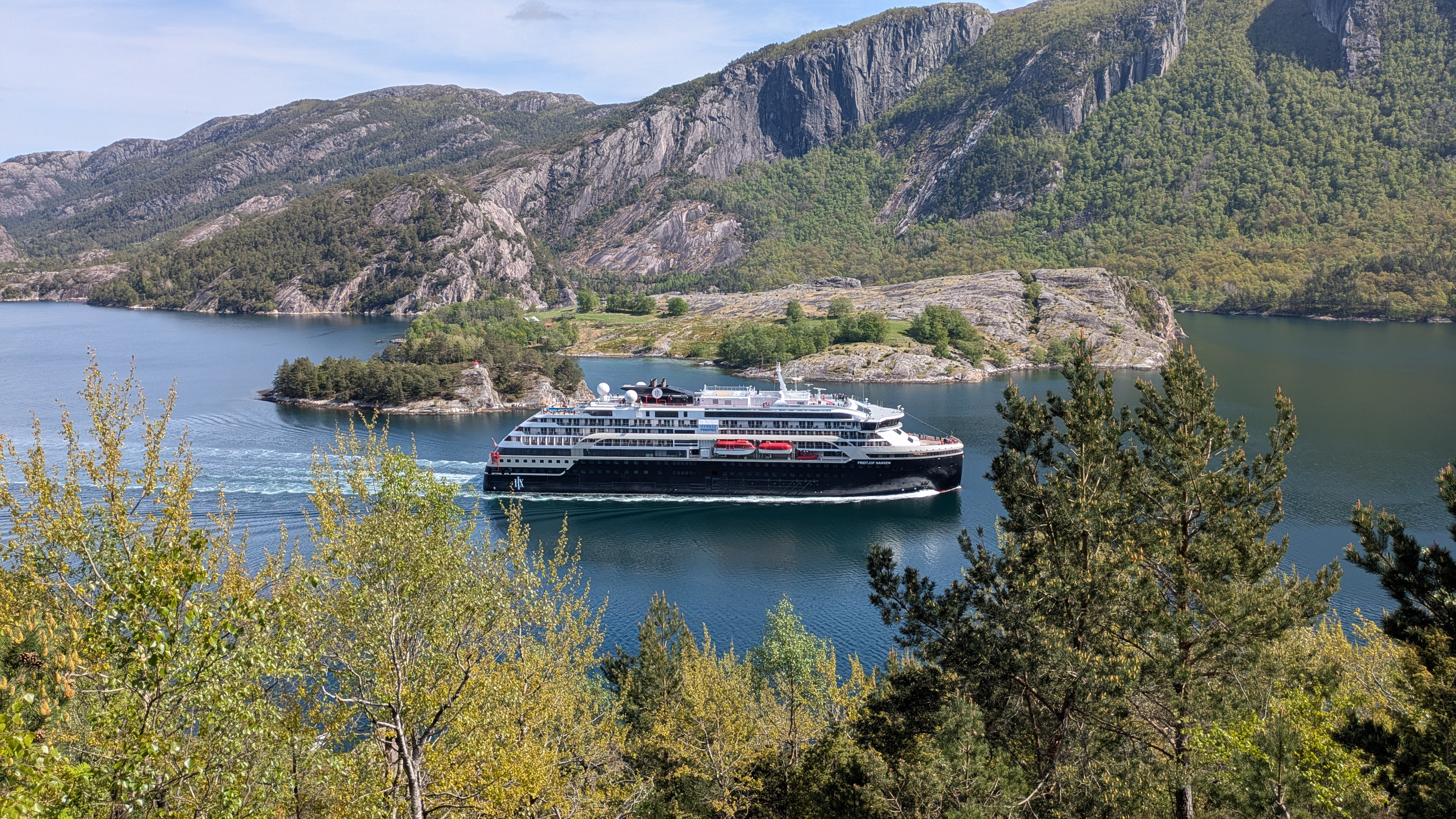
- Fridtjof Nansen in Lysefjord, seen from Fv523 looking west, Bergsholmen in the background.

History

Norway
- Name: Fridtjof Nansen
- Namesake: Fridtjof Nansen
- Operator: HX Expeditions
- Builder: Kleven Verft, Ulsteinvik, Norway
- Identification: IMO number: 9813084

General characteristics
- Type: Cruise ship
- Tonnage: 20,889 GT

MS Fridtjof Nansen is a polar expedition ship, named after polar explorer and scientist Fridtjof Nansen, it is a near identical twin to MS Roald Amundsen. It is a hybrid powered Polar Class 6 ship built by Kleven Yards Ulsteinvik for Hurtigruten, and today sails for HX.

== History ==
Hurtigruten tentatively ordered in April 2016 two newbuildings at Kleven Verft, which should be delivered in July 2018 and 2019. Fridtjof Nansen was officially ordered on 30 June 2016, together with her sister ship Roald Amundsen, at Kleven Verft. Fridtjof Nansen should originally have been delivered in summer 2019. Kleven yard ran into financial difficulties and ended up being bought outright by Hurtigruten. The ship was launched on 9. December 2018. The first cruises should have started in April 2020 from Hamburg. Due to COVID-19 the planned cruises had to be cancelled.

On 11 January 2022, the ship ran aground while on a voyage from Lofoten to Flåm. None of her two-hundred-thirty-three passengers and one-hundred-sixty-five crew were injured. The passengers were taken off the ship and transported to Ålesund. After repairs the ship resumed cruising with passengers on 1 June, departing from Reykjavík.

== Technology ==
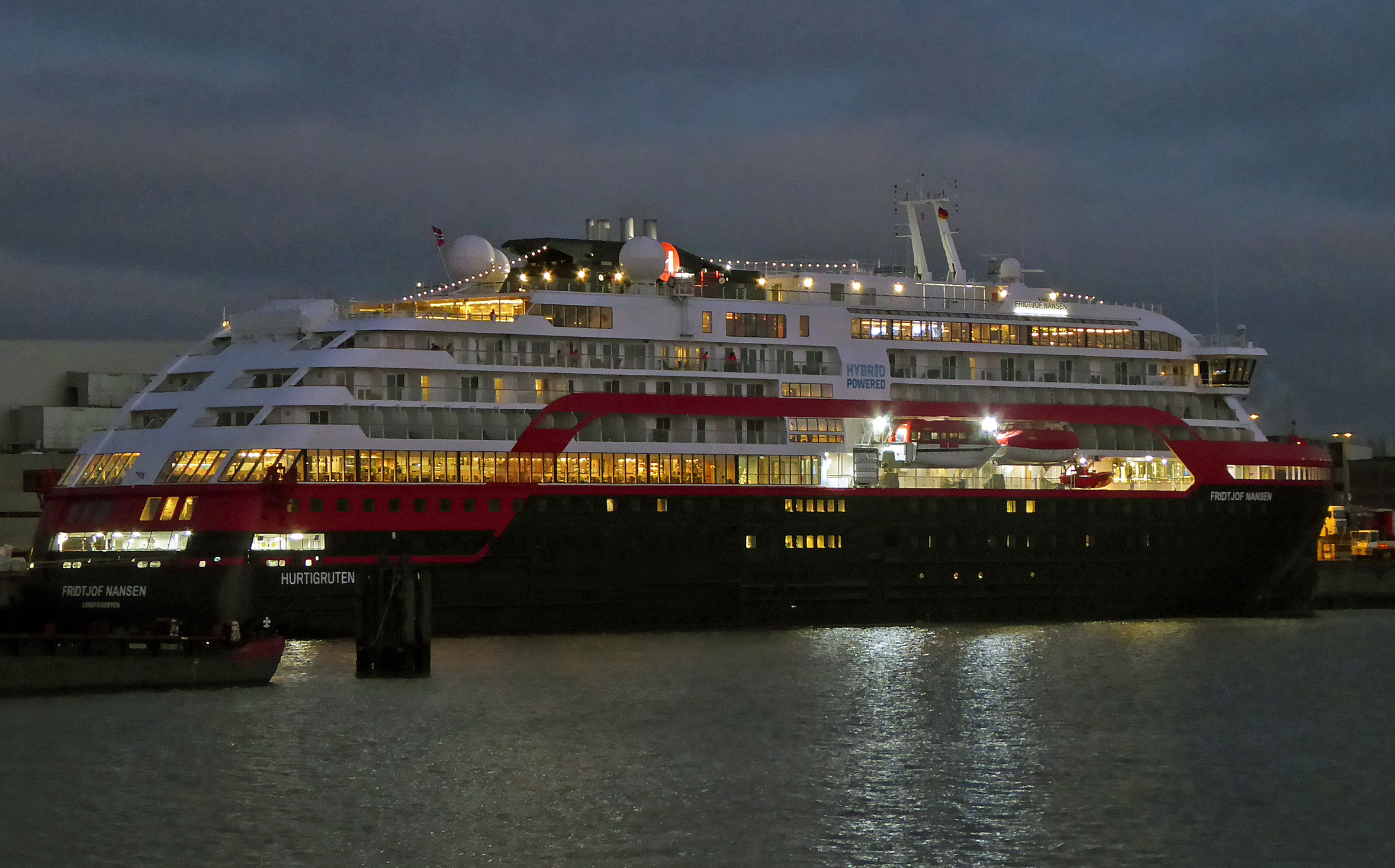
Fridtjof Nansen 2021 in Hamburg

Fridtjof Nansen is the second expedition ship of its class with hybrid power, a combination of diesel-electrical power and pure electrical power, fed from accumulators. The hull is particularly suited for polar regions (Polar class 6) and has a bow like an axe. The propulsion occurs via two Azimuth thrusters.

== Sister ships ==
The development and construction of Fridtjof Nansen is part of a 850 million dollar investment of Hurtigruten AS with the objective to have the most environment-friendly expedition fleet of the world. The first vessel Roald Amundsen has been in operation since July 2019. A third ship was ordered in October 2018 for delivery in 2021. This order was later cancelled.
