= Larsnes Church =

Church in Møre og Romsdal, Norway

- Larsnes kyrkje
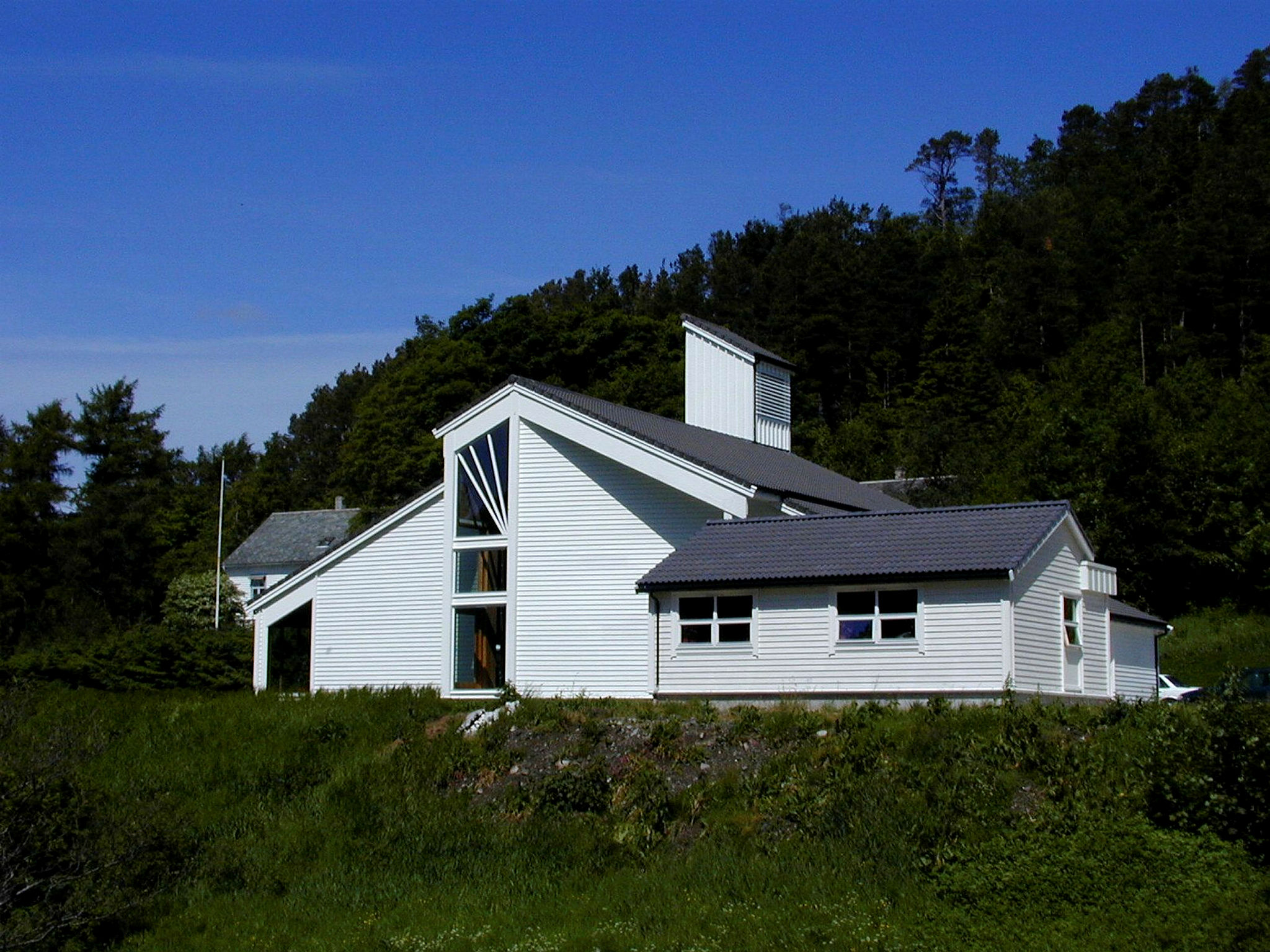
- View of the chapel
- Larsnes Church
- 62°12′05″N 5°34′49″E
- Location: Sande Municipality, Møre og Romsdal
- Country: Norway
- Denomination: Church of Norway
- Churchmanship: Evangelical Lutheran

History
- Former name: Larsnes Chapel
- Status: Chapel
- Founded: 1989
- Consecrated: 1989

Architecture
- Functional status: Active
- Architect(s): Alf Apalseth and Ole Myren
- Completed: 1989 (37 years ago)

Specifications
- Capacity: 250
- Materials: Concrete

Administration
- Diocese: Møre bispedømme
- Deanery: Søre Sunnmøre prosti
- Parish: Gursken
- Norwegian Cultural Heritage Site
- Type: Church
- Status: Not protected
- ID: 227011

Larsnes Church (Norwegian: Larsnes kyrkje; formerly named: Larsnes Chapel) is a chapel of the Church of Norway in Sande Municipality in Møre og Romsdal county, Norway. It is located in the village of Larsnes on the island of Gurskøya. It is an annex chapel in the Gursken parish which is part of the Søre Sunnmøre prosti (deanery) in the Diocese of Møre. The gray and white, concrete building was built in 1989 using plans drawn up by the architects Alf Apalseth and Ole Myren. The building seats about 250 people.

== See also ==
- List of churches in Møre
