= Rovde Municipality =

Former municipality in Møre og Romsdal, Norway

Rovde Municipality Rovde herad
- Former municipality
- Møre og Romsdal within Norway

- Rovde within Møre og Romsdal
- Coordinates: 62°10′30″N 05°44′17″E
- Country: Norway
- County: Møre og Romsdal
- District: Sunnmøre
- Established: 1 Jan 1905
  - Preceded by: Sande Municipality
- Disestablished: 1 Jan 1964
  - Succeeded by: Vanylven Municipality & Sande Municipality
- Administrative centre: Rovdane

Government
  - Mayor (1960–1963): Ola Vedeld

Area (upon dissolution)
  - Total: 51.4 km^{2} (19.8 sq mi)
  - Rank: #586 in Norway
- Highest elevation: 999 m (3,278 ft)

Population (1963)
  - Total: 1,008
  - Rank: #610 in Norway
  - Density: 19.6/km^{2} (51/sq mi)
  - Change (10 years): ▲ +9.9%

Official language
  - Norwegian form: Nynorsk
- Time zone: UTC+01:00 (CET)
  - Summer (DST): UTC+02:00 (CEST)
- ISO 3166 code: NO-1513

Rovde is a former municipality in Møre og Romsdal county, Norway. The 51.4-square-kilometre (19.8 sq mi) municipality existed from 1905 until its dissolution in 1964. The area is now divided between Sande Municipality and Vanylven Municipality in the traditional district of Sunnmøre. The administrative centre was the village of Rovdane. Rovde Church was the main church for the municipality.

Prior to its dissolution in 1964, the 51.1-square-kilometre (19.7 sq mi) municipality was the 586th largest by area out of the 689 municipalities in Norway. Rovde Municipality was the 610th most populous municipality in Norway with a population of about 1,008. The municipality's population density was 19.6 inhabitants per square kilometre (51/sq mi) and its population had increased by 9.9% over the previous 10-year period.

== General information ==
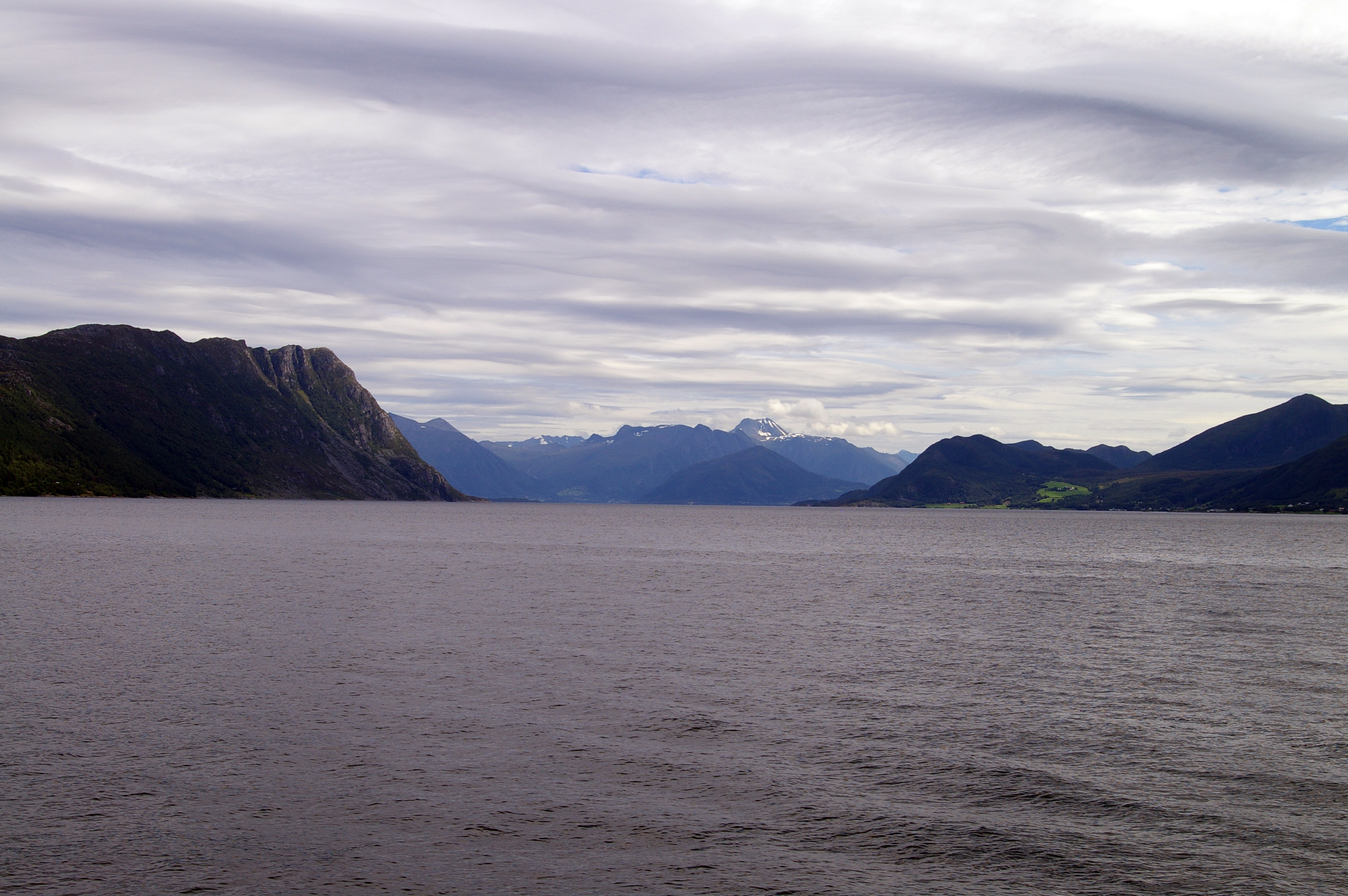
View of the Rovdefjorden, the fjord which cut through Rovde Municipality

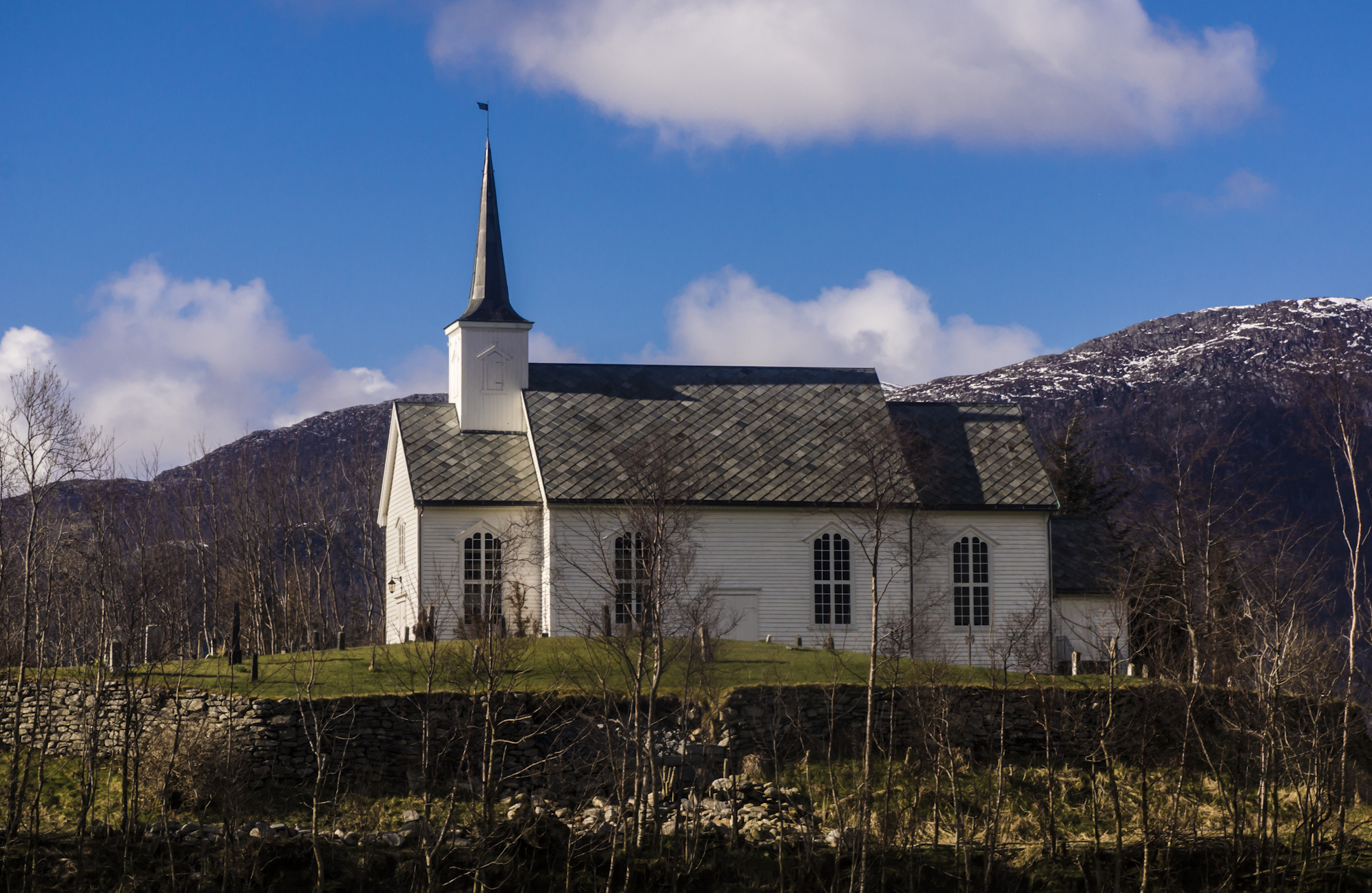
View of Rovde Church

The municipality of Rovde was established on 1 January 1905 when the old Sande Municipality was divided: the southeastern part (population: 610) became Rovde Municipality and the western part (population: 2,221) remained as a smaller Sande Municipality. The new municipality included the villages of Larsnes and Rovdane.

During the 1960s, there were many municipal mergers across Norway due to the work of the Schei Committee. On 1 January 1964, Rovde Municipality (was dissolved: the southern district of Rovde Municipality (Rovdestranda—south of the Rovdefjorden), with 436 inhabitants, was merged into the neighboring Vanylven Municipality. The rest of Rovde Municipality, on Gurskøya island, with 562 inhabitants, was reunited with Sande Municipality.

=== Name ===
The municipality (originally the parish) is named after the old Rovde farm (Old Norse: Rauðvin or Rǫðvin) since the first Rovde Church was built there. The last element of the name comes from the word vin which means "meadow" or "pasture". The first element of the name is less certain. It could come from rauðr which means "red" or rauði which means "bog iron" or rauð which means "moraine" or "ridge". Another option for the first element is that it comes from the name of a local river, Hrǫð. This name comes from the word hrǫð which means "fast",.

=== Churches ===
The Church of Norway had one parish (sokn) within Rovde Municipality. At the time of the municipal dissolution, it was part of the Sande prestegjeld and the Søre Sunnmøre prosti (deanery) in the Diocese of Bjørgvin.

Churches in Rovde Municipality
Parish (sokn)	Church name	Location of the church	Year built
Rovde	Rovde Church	Rovdane	1872

== Geography ==
Rovde included the area on both the north and south sides of the Rovdefjorden. The northern area was on the island of Gurskøya and the southern part was on the mainland. The highest point in the municipality was the 999-metre (3,278 ft) tall mountain Skoratinden. Sande Municipality was located to the northwest, Herøy Municipality was to the northeast, Dalsfjord Municipality was to the southeast, and Syvde Municipality was to the southwest.

== Government ==
Rovde Municipality was responsible for primary education (through 10th grade), outpatient health services, senior citizen services, welfare and other social services, zoning, economic development, and municipal roads and utilities. The municipality was governed by a municipal council of directly elected representatives. The mayor was indirectly elected by a vote of the municipal council. The municipality was under the jurisdiction of the Frostating Court of Appeal.

=== Municipal council ===
The municipal council (Heradsstyre) of Rovde Municipality was made up of 17 representatives that were elected to four year terms. The tables below show the historical composition of the council by political party.

Rovde heradsstyre 1959–1963
Party name (in Nynorsk)	Number of representatives
Local List(s) (Lokale lister)	17
Total number of members:	17
Note: On 1 January 1964, Rovde Municipality divided between Sande Municipality and Vanylven Municipality.

Rovde heradsstyre 1955–1959
Party name (in Nynorsk)	Number of representatives
Local List(s) (Lokale lister)	17
Total number of members:	17

Rovde heradsstyre 1951–1955
Party name (in Nynorsk)	Number of representatives
Local List(s) (Lokale lister)	16
Total number of members:	16

Rovde heradsstyre 1947–1951
Party name (in Nynorsk)	Number of representatives
Local List(s) (Lokale lister)	16
Total number of members:	16

Rovde heradsstyre 1945–1947
Party name (in Nynorsk)	Number of representatives
List of workers, fishermen, and small farmholders (Arbeidarar, fiskarar, småbrukarar liste)	1
Local List(s) (Lokale lister)	15
Total number of members:	16

Rovde heradsstyre 1937–1941*
Party name (in Nynorsk)	Number of representatives
Labour Party (Arbeidarpartiet)	1
Local List(s) (Lokale lister)	15
Total number of members:	16
Note: Due to the German occupation of Norway during World War II, no elections were held for new municipal councils until after the war ended in 1945.

=== Mayors ===
The mayor (Nynorsk: ordførar) of Rovde Municipality was the political leader of the municipality and the chairperson of the municipal council. The following people have held this position:

- 1905–1922: Daniel Liseth (V)
- 1923–1931: Emil Indresøvde (V)
- 1932–1942: Anders Søvdsnes
- 1943–1945: Paul Hageselle (NS)
- 1945–1945: Anders Søvdsnes
- 1946–1959: Rasmus Torset (V)
- 1960–1963: Ola Vedeld

== Poem ==
J. Nordhagen wrote the following poen about the Rovdestranda area of Rovde Municipality in 1928:

Rovdestranda, by the poet J. Nordhagen, 1928.
English language	Norwegian language
Sailor go from Stadt to the north on a brilliant sunny day, steer with courage from the ocean into the fjord, how calm becomes the sea. Then gaze from the bow rightwards shade your eyes for better to see the cloudfree mountains under heaven, and calm under them all lies Rovdestranden. From Søvdsnes to Kleiven along the brave way north are tended farms, where the people dwell. Yes, a finer place you can hardly find than beautiful Rovdestranda.	Seiler du leden fra Stadt imot nord en strålende solskinsdag, styer fra havet mot indre fjord, hvor sjøen får mindre drag. da sees fra baugen—du stirrer i le og skygger med hånden for bedre å se de skyfrie fjell under himmelranden, og under dem lunt ligger Rovdestranden. Fra Søvdsnes til Kleiven langs veien mot nord er velstelte gårder, hvor folket bor. Ja, skjønnere sted du knapt finne kan enn denne naturskjønne Rovdestranda.

== See also ==
- List of former municipalities of Norway
