= Rovde Church =

Church in Møre og Romsdal, Norway

- Rovde kyrkje
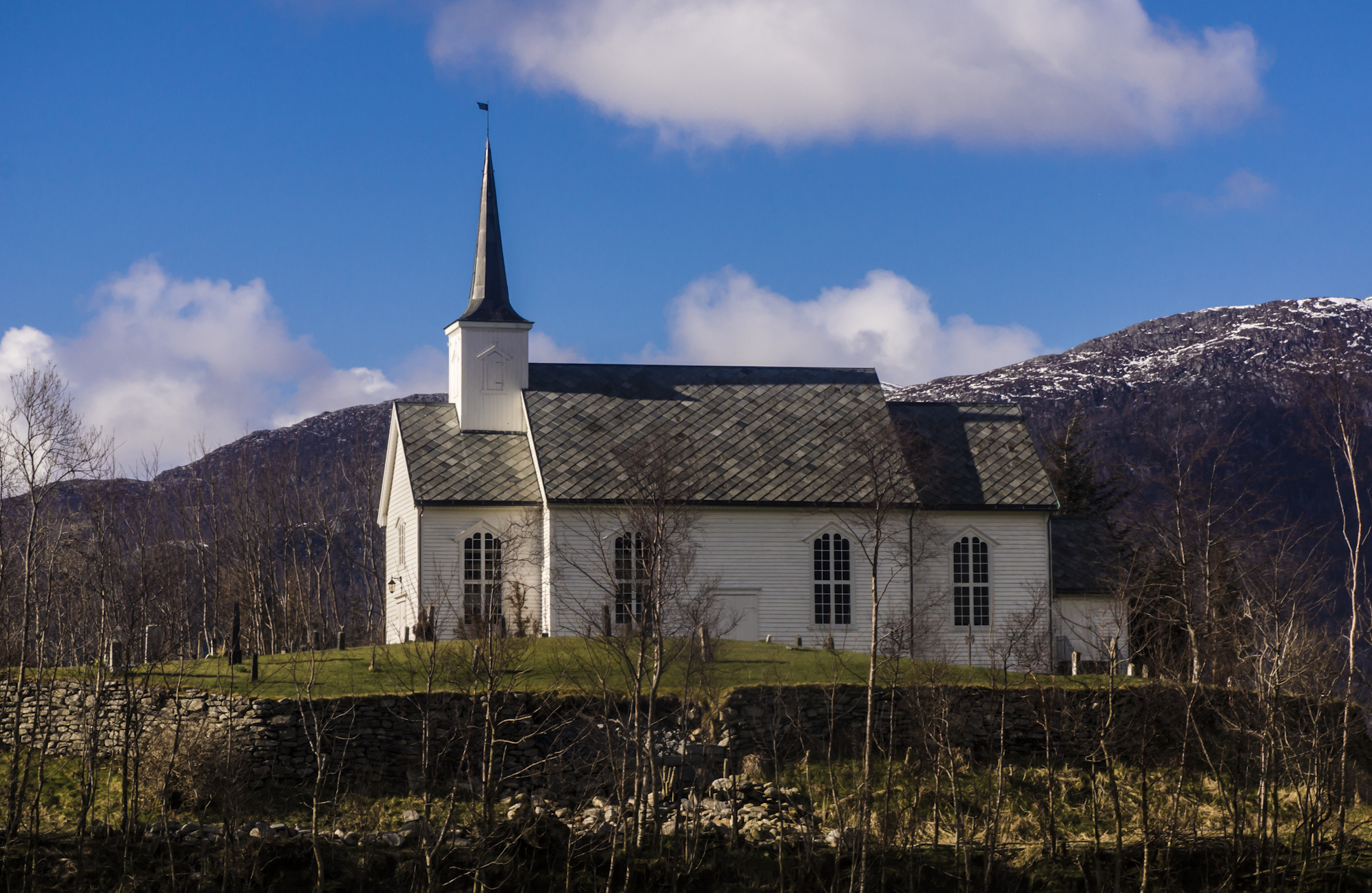
- View of the church
- Rovde Church
- 62°10′35″N 5°44′24″E
- Location: Vanylven Municipality, Møre og Romsdal
- Country: Norway
- Denomination: Church of Norway
- Churchmanship: Evangelical Lutheran

History
- Status: Parish church
- Founded: 13th century
- Consecrated: 2 Nov 1872

Architecture
- Functional status: Active
- Architect: Lars Tornæs
- Architectural type: Long church
- Completed: 1872 (154 years ago)

Specifications
- Capacity: 350
- Materials: Wood

Administration
- Diocese: Møre bispedømme
- Deanery: Søre Sunnmøre prosti
- Parish: Rovde
- Norwegian Cultural Heritage Site
- Type: Church
- Status: Listed
- ID: 85320

Rovde Church (Norwegian: Rovde kyrkje) is a parish church of the Church of Norway in Vanylven Municipality in Møre og Romsdal county, Norway. It is located in the village of Rovdane, along the Rovdefjorden. It is the church for the Rovde parish which is part of the Søre Sunnmøre prosti (deanery) in the Diocese of Møre. The white, wooden church was built in a long church design in 1872 using plans drawn up by the architect Lars Tornæs from Ålesund. The church seats about 350 people.

== History ==
The earliest existing historical records of the church date back to 1589, but the church was not new that year. The first church in Rovde was a small, wooden stave church that was likely established during the 13th century. The first church was located a few meters south of the present church site. The medieval church had a long church design with a slate roof and no tower or spire. It was one of the poorest parishes in all of Sunnmøre, not owning any property except for a few cows. Probably in the 1600s, the church was enlarged by adding a new timber-framed nave and the old nave from the stave church was converted into the new choir.

By the early 1800s, the church was in poor shape due to deterioration over time. In 1831, the centuries-old building was torn down. In 1831–1832, a new wooden church was constructed on the same site. The new church was a timber-framed long church and it was consecrated on 2 July 1832. In 1872, after only 40 years in use, the parish decided to build a new church since the old one was small and not built well. So in 1872, the church was disassembled and sold. The materials were purchased by an individual who used them to build a boathouse on nearby Sandsøya. After the old church was removed, a new church was constructed on a new site, a few meters to the northwest of the old church site. The new church was also a long church with a choir and sacristy on the east end and a church porch on the west end. It was designed by the builder Lars Tornæs from Ålesund, who presumably used the nearby Syvde Church as a model. The new building was consecrated on 2 November 1872.

== See also ==
- List of churches in Møre
