= MS Roald Amundsen =

Norwegian hybrid powered cruise ship

Roald Amundsen
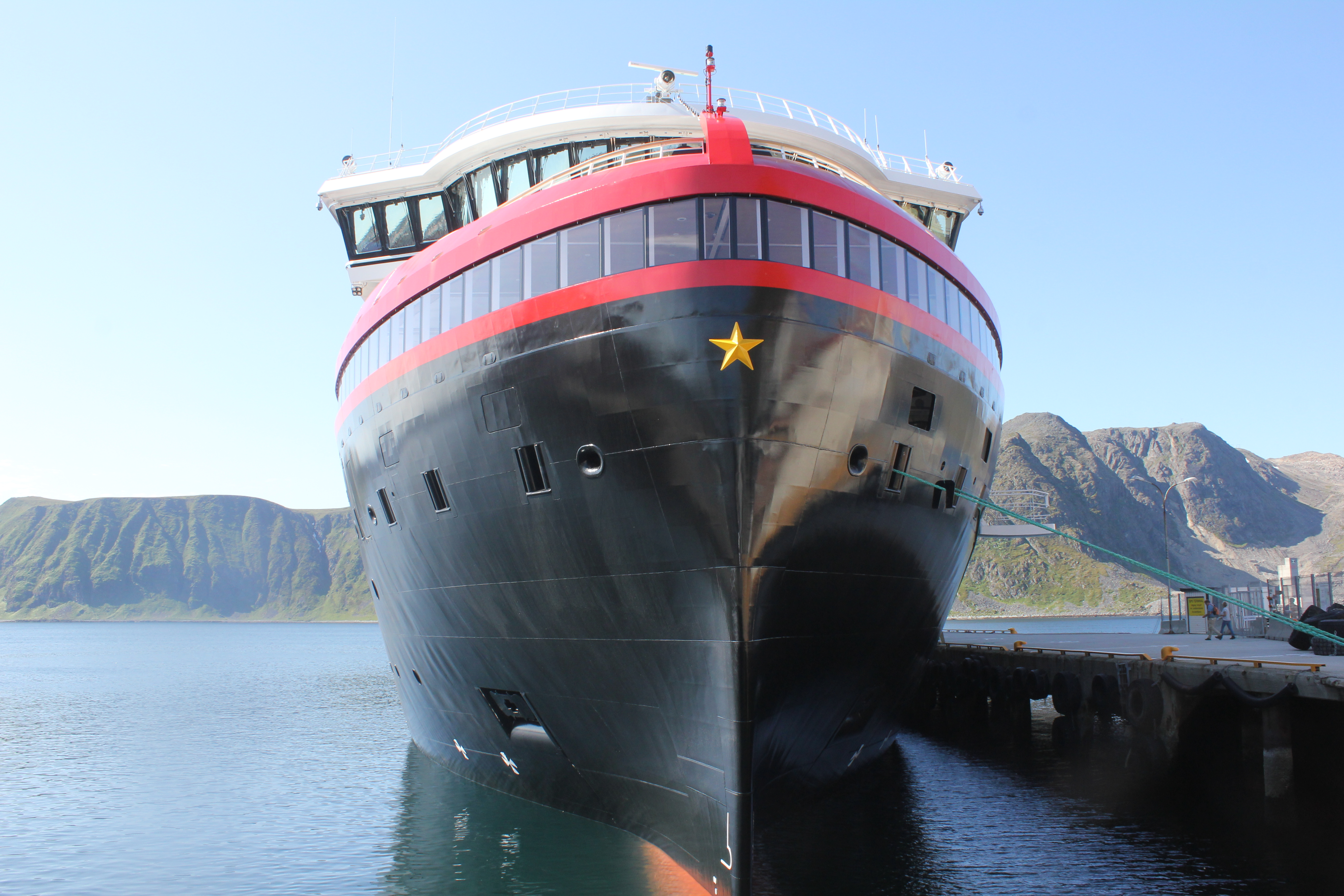

History

Norway
- Name: Roald Amundsen
- Namesake: Roald Amundsen
- Operator: HX Expeditions
- Builder: Kleven Verft, Ulsteinvik, Norway
- Launched: 17 February 2018
- Completed: July 2018
- Identification: IMO number: 9813072
- Status: Active

General characteristics
- Type: Cruise ship
- Tonnage: 20,889 GT
- Length: 140 m (459 ft 4 in)
- Beam: 23.6 m (77 ft 5 in)
- Height: 29 m (95 ft 2 in)
- Draught: 5.3 m (17 ft 5 in)
- Decks: 11
- Ice class: Polar Class 6
- Capacity: 530–1,018

MS Roald Amundsen is a hybrid powered expedition cruise ship operated by HX Expeditions. She was built by Kleven Yards of Norway and started her maiden voyage on 3 July 2019 from the Norwegian port Tromsø to Hamburg. She and her sister ship Fridtjof Nansen were the first hybrid-powered ships in the Hurtigruten fleet, but now sail with HX.

Roald Amundsen was christened in fall 2019 in Antarctica with a chunk of ice instead of the traditional bottle of champagne. The vessel has Polar Class 6 rating for arctic conditions. Roald Amundsen was the first hybrid ship to sail the Northwest Passage.

== Construction and career ==
Roald Amundsen was launched on 17 February 2018. In late February 2018, Hurtigruten announced that the company would not take delivery of Roald Amundsen until 2019 because of problems at the shipyard.

In 2019, the ship began expedition cruises along the Norwegian Coast, as well as trips to the North and South Poles. During the evening of 10 September 2019, Roald Amundsen arrived in Nome, Alaska, captained by Kai Albrigtsen, and the operator announced the first complete passage of the more than 3,000-nautical-mile (5,600 km; 3,500 mi) passage from the Atlantic Ocean to the Pacific Ocean, by hybrid propulsion.

=== Coronavirus pandemic ===
After the global halting of cruise operations due to the coronavirus pandemic, Roald Amundsen had resumed its cruises on 17 July 2020 with a seven-day roundtrip cruise from Tromsø to Svalbard, followed by another that departed on 24 July 2020. Several days before arriving back in Tromsø on 31 July 2020, two crew members became sick and were isolated. (Note: Hurtigruten claimed that the two crew members were isolated for a different illness.) Upon arrival at Tromsø, four crew members, including the two isolated ones, were tested for coronavirus, and the University Hospital of North Norway (UNN) announced that all four had tested positive for COVID-19. (Note: They were the first coronavirus patients admitted to UNN since 5 June.) As a result, all 160 crew members were to be tested.

Many passengers had already disembarked and had been making their way home before the news broke about the infected crew, with one bus driver stating that he had driven 28 passengers from Roald Amundsen to the airport hours before the news broke. Hurtigruten stated that they would inform the passengers of both cruises about their potential exposure to the virus via SMS. There were 209 passengers aboard the 17 July 2020 cruise, and 177 aboard the 24 July 2020 cruise.

Later that evening, it was revealed that a passenger from Vesterålen aboard the 17 July 2020 cruise had tested positive for the virus days earlier, and that on 29 July 2020, an official from Vesterålen clearly informed at least four people in Hurtigruten, as well as the Norwegian Institute of Public Health (NIPH), about the positive case, and recommended that all passengers on the second sailing be informed on the same day. However, Hurtigruten had believed there was no need to worry.

One report stated that passengers on the second sailing were not advised that COVID-19 infection had been found on the ship. Others said they had learned about it later from the news reports.

All 177 passengers aboard the 24 July cruise and all 160 crew members were required to enter quarantine. Roald Amundsen was originally scheduled to set sail for Svalbard again that afternoon, but the cruise was cancelled, and the ship's next planned voyage was scheduled for the beginning of September.

The next day, on 1 August 2020, Tromsø Mayor Gunnar Wilhelmsen announced that an additional 29 crew members had tested positive, meaning that 33 people had tested positive as of that date. Later that evening, Mayor Wilhelmsen confirmed that 36 people had tested positive so far, including one passenger. The mayor disapproved of how Hurtigruten had handled the situation, stating that he believed the passengers should have been informed and quarantined before the ship had docked in Tromsø, and that he worried that a major outbreak might occur because passengers had wandered around the city before they were notified about the sick crew members. Troms Parliament Member Kent Gudmundsen expressed shock over Hurtigruten's management of the situation, and Minister of Health and Care Services Bent Høie praised the efforts of Tromsø and the NIPH in containing the virus. Up to 69 municipalities might have been affected by the outbreak, and officials had still been unable to contact 20 of the 177 passengers aboard the 27 July cruise by evening.

An update on 3 August 2020 stated that four of the passengers who were on the two cruises had tested positive for the virus.
