= Haugsholmen Lighthouse =

Coastal lighthouse in Sande, Norway

Haugsholmen Lighthouse Haugsholmen fyr
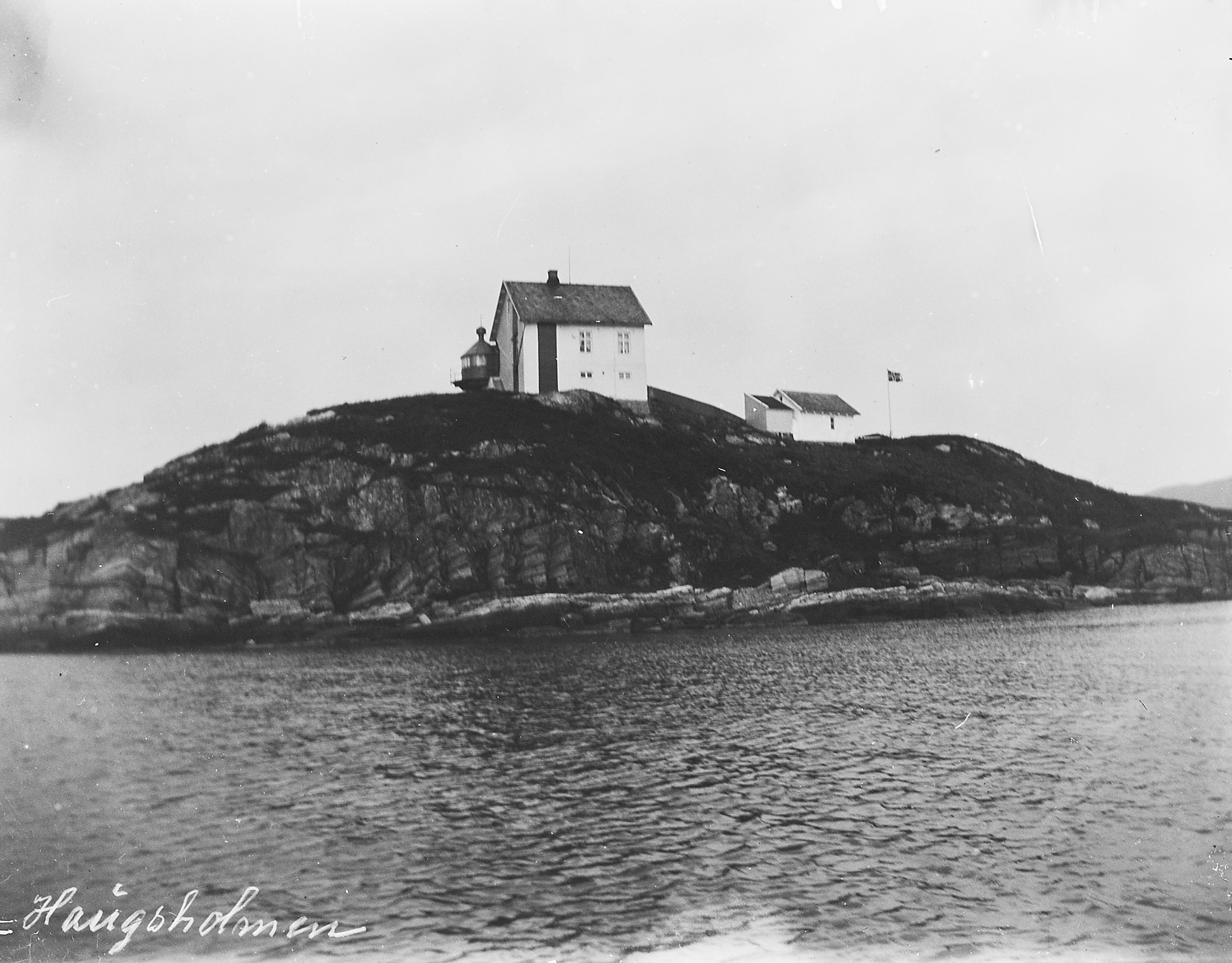
- Location: Frekøy Island; Møre og Romsdal; Norway
- Coordinates: 62°10′42″N 5°22′30″E

Tower
- Constructed: 1876
- Construction: masonry tower
- Automated: 1980
- Height: 10 m (33 ft)
- Shape: cylindrical tower with balcony and lantern attached to keeper's house
- Markings: red tower and lantern
- Operator: Sande Municipality

Light
- Focal height: 20 m (66 ft)
- Range: 13.6 nmi (25.2 km; 15.7 mi)
- Characteristic: Oc(2) WRG 10s

Haugsholmen Lighthouse (Norwegian: Haugsholmen fyr) is a coastal lighthouse located in Sande Municipality in Møre og Romsdal county, Norway. It is located on the tiny island of Vestre Frekøy, in the mouth of the Vanylvsfjorden, about 2.5 kilometres (1.6 mi) southwest of the island of Kvamsøya. It was established in 1876 and automated in 1979.

The 10-metre (33 ft) tall tower sits at an elevation of 19.7 metres (65 ft) above sea level. The light emits white, red or green light, depending on direction, occulting twice every 10 seconds. The red cylindrical tower with lantern and gallery is attached to one corner of a 2 1/2-story white keeper's house.

== See also ==
- List of lighthouses in Norway
- Lighthouses in Norway
