= Voksa =

Island in Møre og Romsdal, Norway

- Interactive map of Voksa

Geography
- Location: Møre og Romsdal, Norway
- Coordinates: 62.2179°N 5.4623°E
- Area: 1.3 km^{2} (0.50 sq mi)
- Length: 1.9 km (1.18 mi)
- Width: 1.2 km (0.75 mi)
- Coastline: 5.5 km (3.42 mi)
- Highest elevation: 52 m (171 ft)

Administration
- Norway
- County: Møre og Romsdal
- Municipality: Sande Municipality

Voksa is an island in Sande Municipality in Møre og Romsdal county, Norway. The 1.3-square-kilometre (0.50 sq mi) island lies about 2 kilometres (1.2 mi) east of the island of Kvamsøya, about 1.5 kilometres (0.93 mi) south of the island of Sandsøya, about 3.3 kilometres (2.1 mi) west of the larger island of Gurskøya, and about 1.5 kilometres (0.93 mi) north of the mainland village of Åram in neighboring Vanylven Municipality.

The island is fairly flat except for one 52-metre (171 ft) high hill along the southern shore. There are a few residents of the island, scattered about several farms on the island. Since 1965, there has been a 2.5-kilometre (1.6 mi) long road/bridge/causeway connection to the island of Sandsøya (to the north). The residents of Sandsøya must drive to Voksa to reach the only regular ferry connection to the islands. The ferry runs between the islands of Kvamsøya, Voksa, and Gurskøya and also to Åram on the mainland.

== See also ==
- List of islands of Norway
