= Gursken Church =

Church in Møre og Romsdal, Norway

- Gursken kyrkje
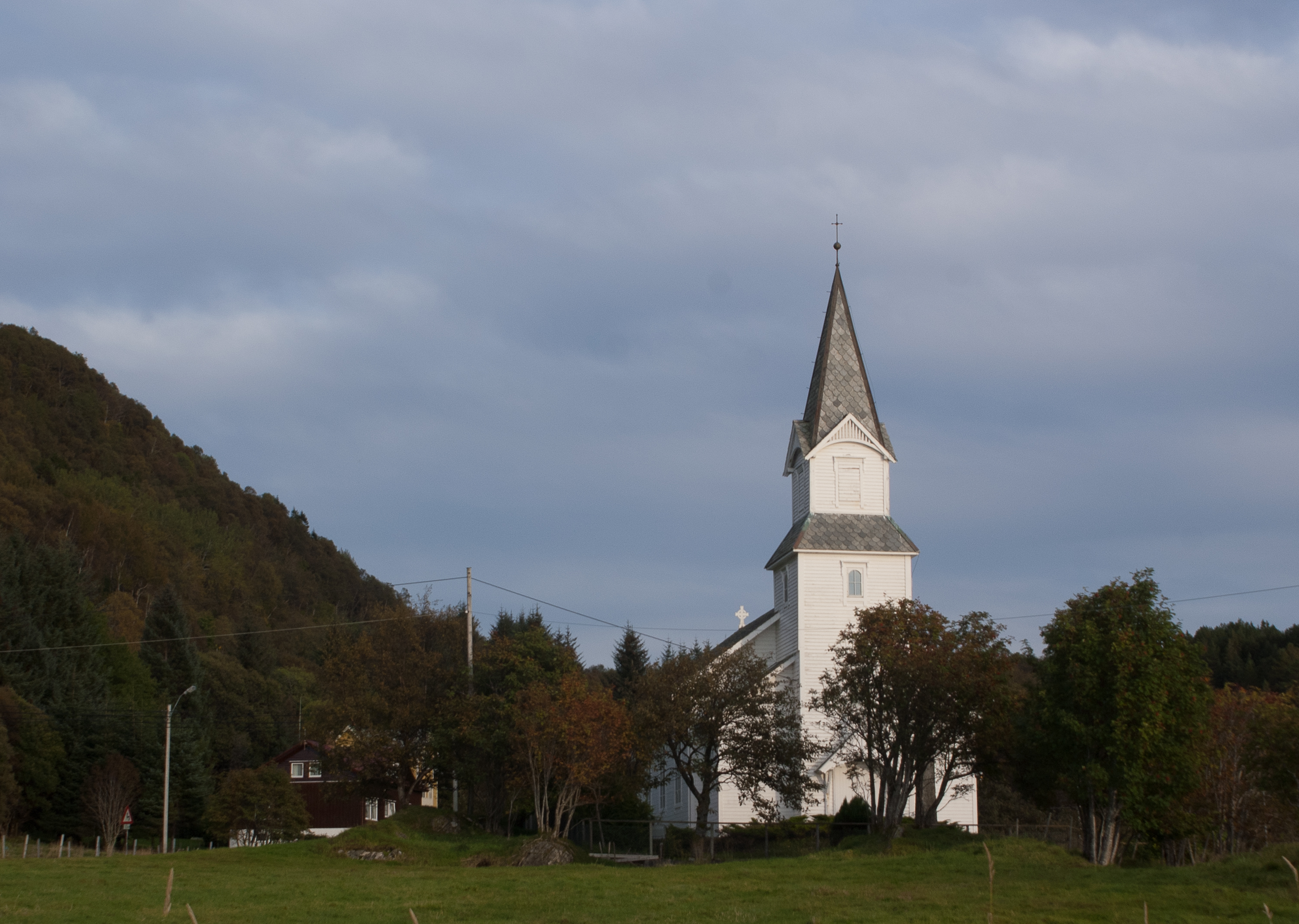
- View of the church
- Gursken Church
- 62°13′49″N 5°37′12″E
- Location: Sande Municipality, Møre og Romsdal
- Country: Norway
- Denomination: Church of Norway
- Churchmanship: Evangelical Lutheran

History
- Status: Parish church
- Founded: 1919
- Consecrated: 5 November 1919

Architecture
- Functional status: Active
- Architect: Eduard Carlén
- Architectural type: Long church
- Completed: 1919 (107 years ago)

Specifications
- Capacity: 270
- Materials: Wood

Administration
- Diocese: Møre bispedømme
- Deanery: Søre Sunnmøre prosti
- Parish: Gursken
- Norwegian Cultural Heritage Site
- Type: Church
- Status: Not protected
- ID: 84452

Gursken Church (Norwegian: Gursken kyrkje) is a parish church of the Church of Norway in Sande Municipality in Møre og Romsdal county, Norway. It is located in the village of Haugsbygda on the island of Gurskøya. It is one of the two churches for the Gursken parish which is part of the Søre Sunnmøre prosti (deanery) in the Diocese of Møre. The white, wooden church was built in a long church design in 1919 using plans drawn up by the architect Eduard Carlén. The church seats about 270 people.

== History ==
The parish received permission to build a church in Gursken in 1918. The parish hired the Swedish architect Eduard Carlén, who is best known for having designed a large number of tenements in Kristiania (now Oslo) in the 1890s. The wooden long church was built in 1918-1919. It was formally consecrated on 5 November 1919.

== See also ==
- List of churches in Møre
