= Kleven Group =

Kleven Group is the parent company for Kleven shipyard and Myklebust shipyard, and is one of the largest companies in Ulsteinvik besides Rolls-Royce Marine and Ulstein Group. Kleven Group had about 450 employees in 2011.

The Kleven Group operates businesses within the construction, repair and remodeling of vessels in Ulsteinvik, at Gursken and at rented facilities on Rovde. The financial turnover was about 2500 MNOK (430 Mill USD) in 2011. The yard was acquired by Green Yard in 2020.

In 2012 Kleven was one of the main sponsors of Hødd.
