= Haugsbygda, Møre og Romsdal =

Village in Sande Municipality, Norway

Haugsbygda Gursken
- Village
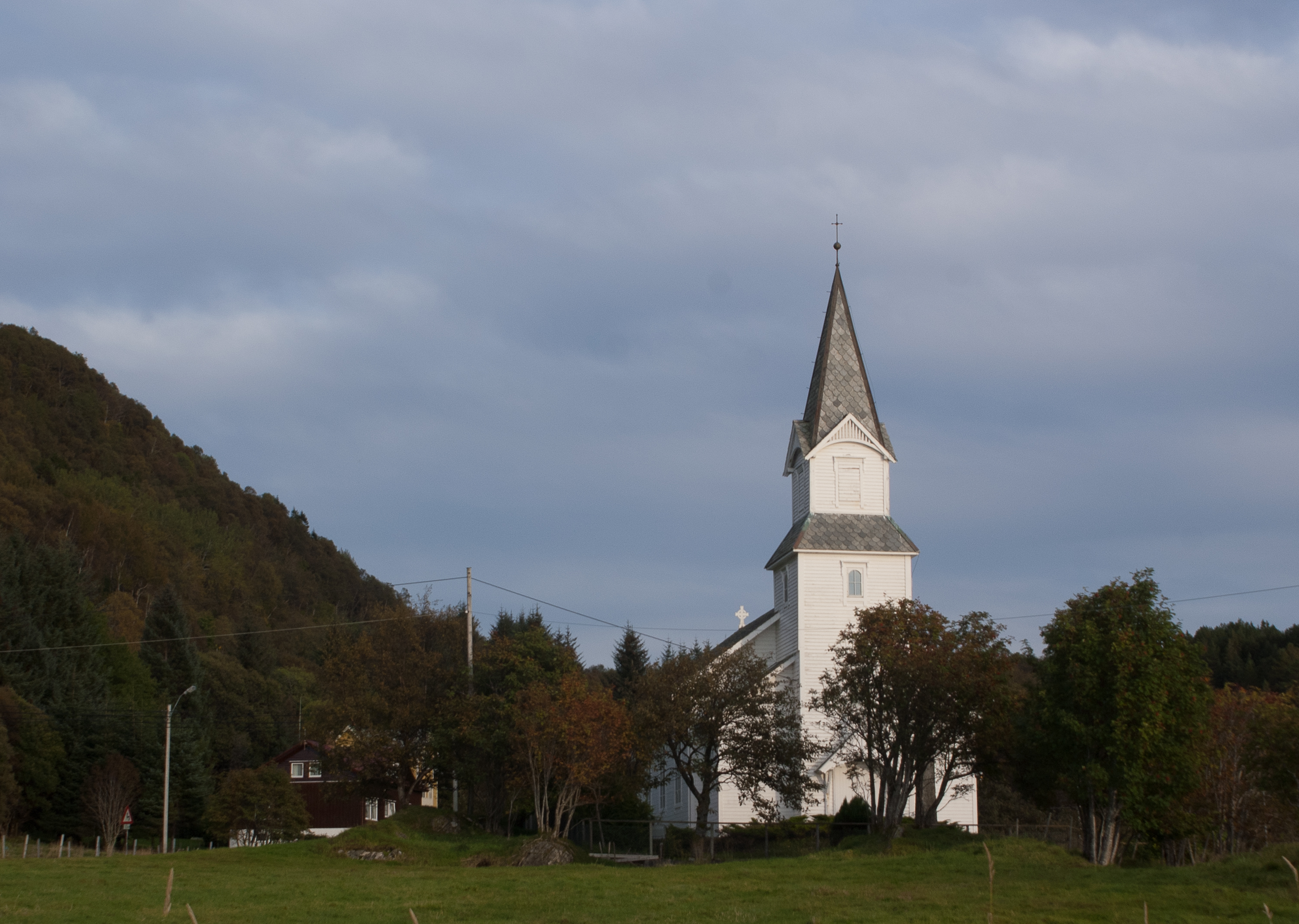
- View of Gursken Church
- Interactive map of Haugsbygda
- Location within Møre og Romsdal Location within Norway
- Coordinates: 62.2359°N 5.5847°E
- Country: Norway
- Region: Western Norway
- County: Møre og Romsdal
- District: Sunnmøre
- Municipality: Sande Municipality

Area
  - Total: 0.34 km^{2} (0.13 sq mi)
- Elevation: 39 m (128 ft)

Population (2024)
  - Total: 304
  - Density: 894/km^{2} (2,320/sq mi)
- Time zone: UTC+01:00 (CET)
  - Summer (DST): UTC+02:00 (CEST)
- Post Code: 6082 Gursken

Haugsbygda (or Gursken) is a village in Sande Municipality in Møre og Romsdal county in the western part of Norway. The village is situated on a narrow strip of relatively flat land along the Gursken fjord on the west side of the island of Gurskøya. Gursken Church is located in the eastern part of the village. Neighboring villages are Gjerde (to the north), Gurskebotn (to the east), and Larsnes (to the south).

The 0.34-square-kilometre (84-acre) village has a population (2024) of 304 and a population density of 894 inhabitants per square kilometre (2,320/sq mi).

== Economy ==
Myklebust Verft is the largest employer in the village. There is a primary school in the village called Gursken Oppvekstsenter. A grocery store is located nearby at the end of the fjord.

== Notable people ==
- Jan Åge Fjørtoft, a former Norwegian football player who hails from Gursken
