= Rovdefjorden =

Fjord in Sunnmøre, Norway

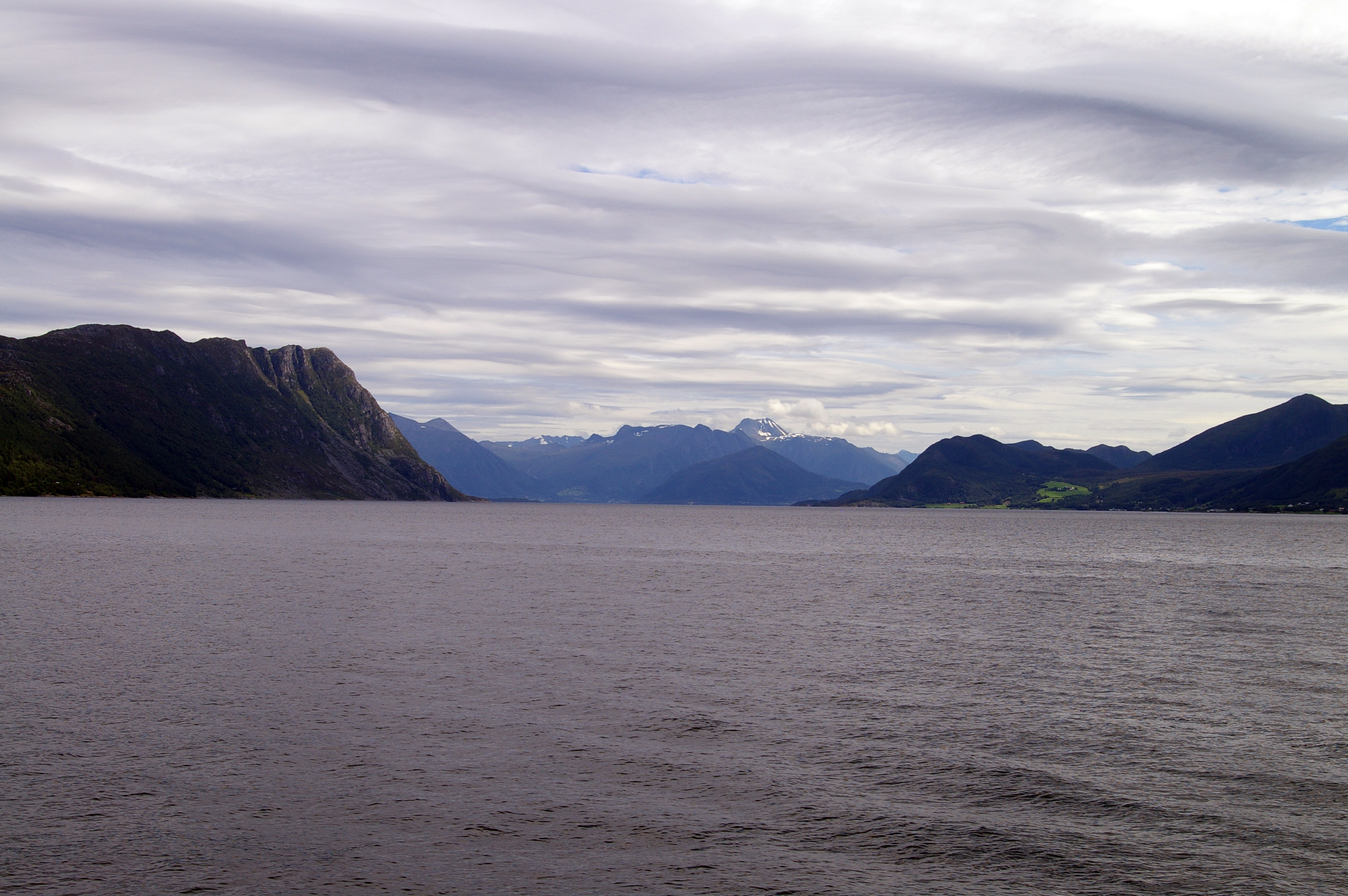
- View of the fjord
- Interactive map of the fjord
- Location: Sunnmøre, Norway
- Coordinates: 62.19075°N 5.71048°E
- Type: Fjord
- Primary inflows: Vartdalsfjorden, Voldsfjorden
- Primary outflows: Hallefjorden
- Basin countries: Norway
- Max. length: 15 kilometres (9.3 mi)
- Max. width: 3.5 kilometres (2.2 mi)
- Max. depth: 501 metres (1,644 ft)

Rovdefjorden is a fjord (more precisely, a strait) in Møre og Romsdal county, Norway. The fjord runs through the municipalities of Sande, Herøy, Vanylven, Volda, and a small part of Ulstein. The eastern end of the fjord connects with the Vartdalsfjorden and Voldsfjorden and the western end of the fjord connects with the Hallefjorden. The Syvdsfjorden branches off the Rovdefjorden to the south. The fjord is bounded by the mainland to the south and the island of Gurskøya to the north.

The 15-kilometre (9.3 mi) long fjord is about 2 to 3 kilometres (1.2 to 1.9 mi) wide, and it reaches a maximum depth of 501 metres (1,644 ft) below sea level, near the mouth of the Voldsfjorden.

The area around the Rovdefjorden was once part of the old Rovde Municipality from 1905 until 1964. The area south of the Rovdefjorden is called Rovdestranda. There are a few villages along the fjord, the largest of which is Rovdane, on the south shore in Vanylven Municipality.

== See also ==
- List of Norwegian fjords
