= Larsnes =

Village in Sande Municipality, Norway

- Village
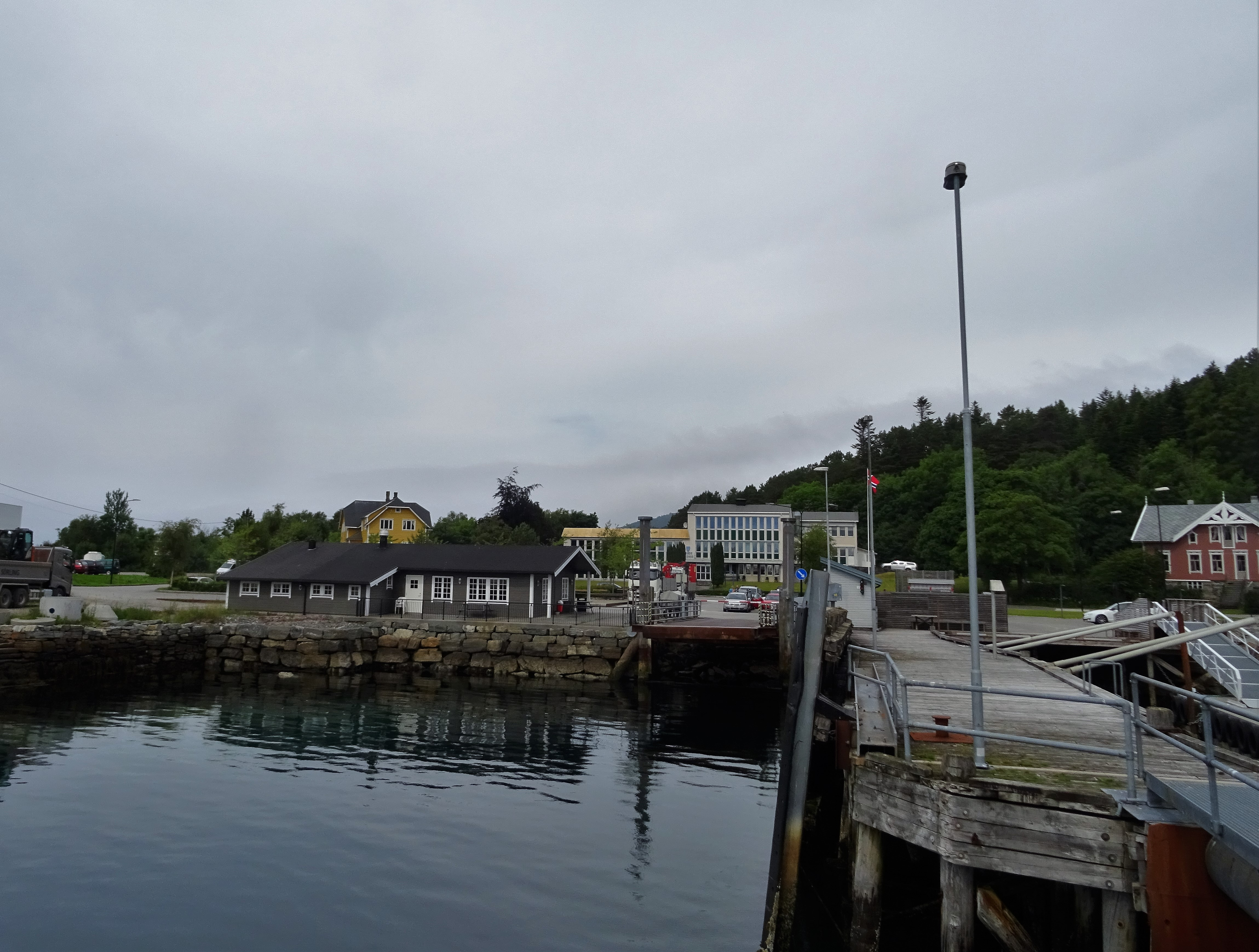
- Larsnes Ferjekai
- Interactive map of Larsnes
- Location within Møre og Romsdal Location within Norway
- Coordinates: 62.2071°N 5.5713°E
- Country: Norway
- Region: Western Norway
- County: Møre og Romsdal
- District: Sunnmøre
- Municipality: Sande Municipality

Area
  - Total: 0.59 km^{2} (0.23 sq mi)
- Elevation: 7 m (23 ft)

Population (2024)
  - Total: 644
  - Density: 1,092/km^{2} (2,830/sq mi)
- Time zone: UTC+01:00 (CET)
  - Summer (DST): UTC+02:00 (CEST)
- Post Code: 6084 Larsnes

Larsnes is the administrative centre of Sande Municipality in Møre og Romsdal county, Norway. It is located on the southwest side of the island of Gurskøya, about 8 kilometres (5.0 mi) east of the island of Kvamsøya, 8 kilometres (5.0 mi) southwest of the village of Haugsbygda, and about 25 kilometres (16 mi) southwest of the town of Ulsteinvik.

The village is home to manufacturing industry, fish processing, fish farming, and cement production. Larsnes Chapel is located in this village.

The 0.59-square-kilometre (150-acre) village has a population (2024) of 644 and a population density of 1,092 inhabitants per square kilometre (2,830/sq mi).

== History ==
From 1905 to 1964, the village of Larsnes was part of the short-lived Rovde Municipality.

== Notable people ==
- Bjartmar Gjerde (1931–2009), a Norwegian politician for the Labour Party
