= Sande Church (Sunnmøre) =

Church in Møre og Romsdal, Norway

- Sande kyrkje
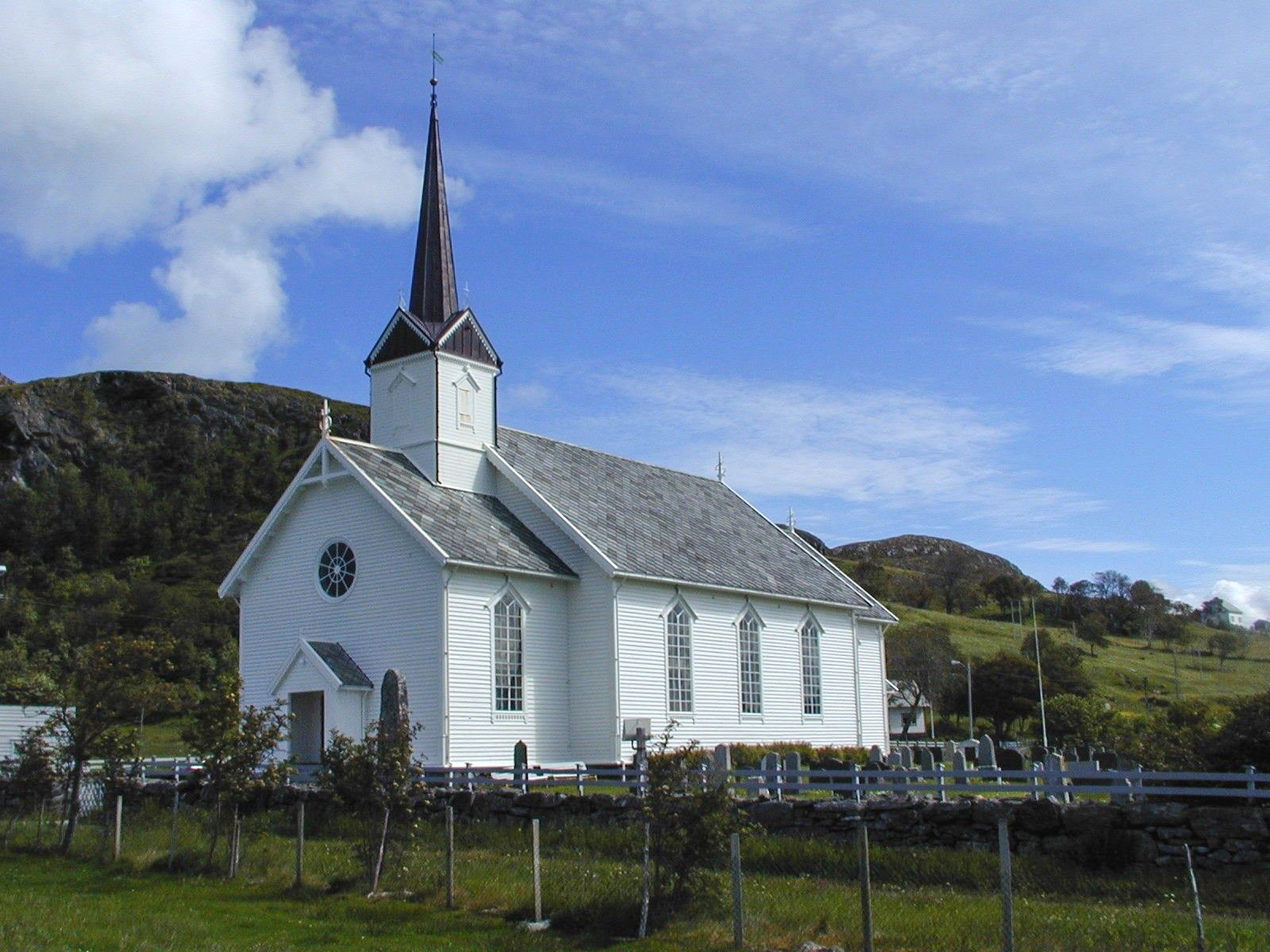
- View of the church
- Sande Church
- 62°14′27″N 5°26′35″E
- Location: Sande Municipality, Møre og Romsdal
- Country: Norway
- Denomination: Church of Norway
- Churchmanship: Evangelical Lutheran

History
- Status: Parish church
- Founded: 14th century
- Consecrated: 30 November 1880

Architecture
- Functional status: Active
- Architect: Jon Sefland
- Architectural type: Long church
- Style: Swiss chalet style
- Completed: 1880 (146 years ago)

Specifications
- Capacity: 400
- Materials: Wood

Administration
- Diocese: Møre bispedømme
- Deanery: Søre Sunnmøre prosti
- Parish: Sande
- Norwegian Cultural Heritage Site
- Type: Church
- Status: Listed
- ID: 85381

Sande Church (Norwegian: Sande kyrkje) is a parish church of the Church of Norway in Sande Municipality in Møre og Romsdal county, Norway. It is located in the village of Sande on the southern shore of the island of Sandsøya. It is the church for the Sande parish which is part of the Søre Sunnmøre prosti (deanery) in the Diocese of Møre. The white, wooden church was built in a long church design in 1880 using plans drawn up by the architect Jon Sefland. The Swiss chalet style church seats about 400 people.

== History ==
The island of Sandsøya has been a church site since the Middle Ages, and the Sande farm was owned by a noble family at least as far back as 1329. The earliest existing historical records of the church date back to the year 1432, but the church was not new that year. The first church in Sande was a wooden stave church that had a long church design. It was possibly built during the 14th century. At some point during the 1500s or 1600s, the church was enlarged by adding a transept to the north and south of the nave which created a cruciform floor plan. A historical record from 1709 mentions a that it is a cruciform stave church with two towers, one above the center of the building and a smaller tower above the eastern cross arm. At that time, the choir measured 20 by 28 feet (6.1 m × 8.5 m) and the nave measured 44 by 28 feet (13.4 m × 8.5 m). The transept (cross-arms) measured 20 by 20 feet (6.1 m × 6.1 m) each and there was also a 12-by-12-foot (3.7 m × 3.7 m) square church porch that served as the main entrance to the building.

In 1835, the old church was torn down. Soon after, a new church was built on the same site. The new building was a timber-framed long church that had a choir and sacristy on the east end and a church porch on the west end. The new church was consecrated on 6 November 1836. The church was heavily damaged during storms in 1863 and in 1874. After the 1874 storm, the parish leaders hired Jon Sefland from Nordfjordeid to repair the church again, but after studying the building, it was decided to tear down the old church. Sefland then designed and built a new church on the same site to replace the older one. The new church, designed similarly to the 1835 church, was completed in 1880. It was consecrated on 30 November 1880.

== See also ==
- List of churches in Møre
