= Rovdane =

Village in Vanylven Municipality, Norway

Rovdane Rovde
- Village
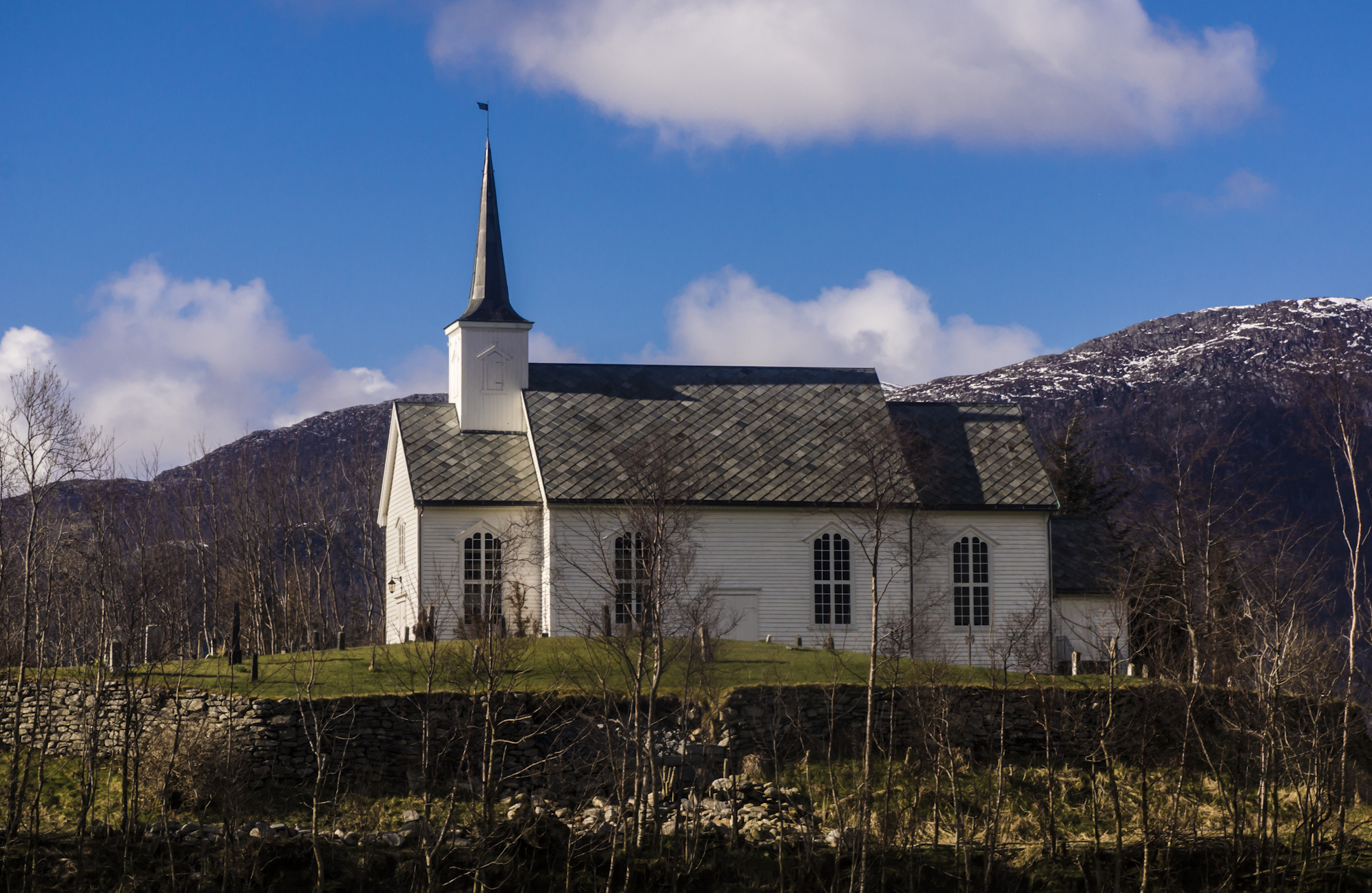
- View of the village church
- Interactive map of Rovdane
- Location within Møre og Romsdal Location within Norway
- Coordinates: 62.1786°N 5.7510°E
- Country: Norway
- Region: Western Norway
- County: Møre og Romsdal
- District: Sunnmøre
- Municipality: Vanylven Municipality
- Elevation: 10 m (33 ft)
- Time zone: UTC+01:00 (CET)
  - Summer (DST): UTC+02:00 (CEST)
- Post Code: 6141 Rovde

Rovdane is a village in Vanylven Municipality in Møre og Romsdal county, Norway. It is located along the Rovdefjorden, about 15 kilometres (9.3 mi) north of the village of Syvde, 27 kilometres (17 mi) northeast of the municipal center of Fiskå, and 20 kilometres (12 mi) (by road, not counting the ferry's sailing distance) west of the village of Volda. The district around Rovdane is referred to as Rovdestranda. Rovde Church is located in the village.

== History ==
Beginning in 1838, Rovdane was administratively a part of Herøy Municipality (see formannskapsdistrikt law). However, this changed on 1 January 1867 when Herøy Municipality was divided into two and the western part became Sande Municipality, which included the areas on both sides of the Rovdefjorden. In 1905, the new Rovde Municipality was separated from Sande Municipality, with Rovdane as the administrative centre of Rovde Municipality. On 1 January 1964, the district of Rovdestranda (south of the fjord), where Rovdane is located, was transferred to Vanylven Municipality and the rest of Rovde was reunited with Sande Municipality. Rovdestranda had 436 inhabitants at that time.
