= Gjerdsvika =

Village in Sande Municipality, Norway

Gjerdsvika Gjerde
- Village
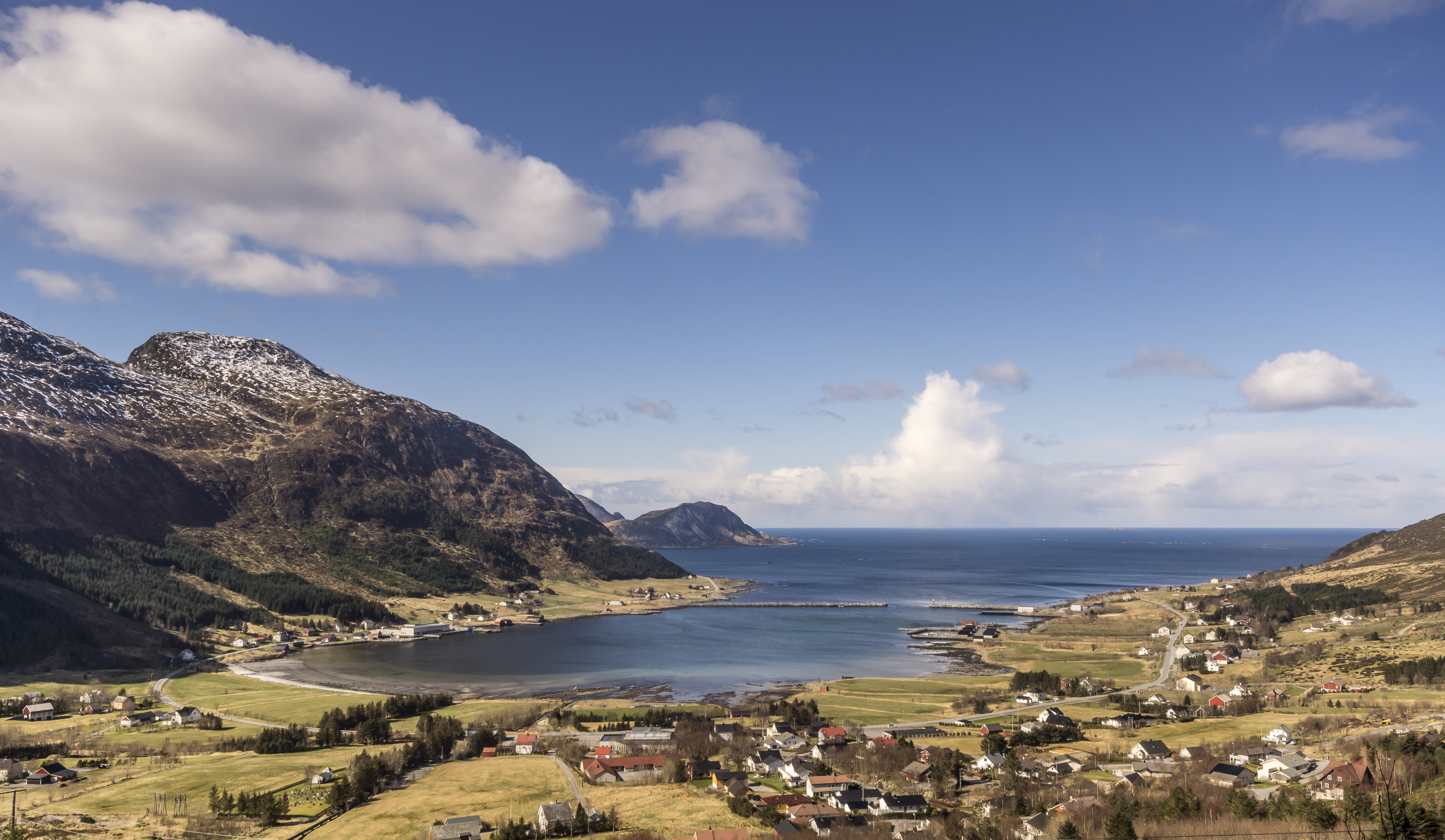
- View of the village
- Interactive map of Gjerdsvika
- Location within Møre og Romsdal Location within Norway
- Coordinates: 62.26089°N 5.579°E
- Country: Norway
- Region: Western Norway
- County: Møre og Romsdal
- District: Sunnmøre
- Municipality: Sande Municipality

Area
  - Total: 0.31 km^{2} (0.12 sq mi)
- Elevation: 11 m (36 ft)

Population (2024)
  - Total: 214
  - Density: 690/km^{2} (1,800/sq mi)
- Time zone: UTC+01:00 (CET)
  - Summer (DST): UTC+02:00 (CEST)
- Post Code: 6083 Gjerdsvika

Gjerdsvika or Gjerde is a village in Sande Municipality in Møre og Romsdal county, Norway. The village is located on the western shore of the island of Gurskøya. It lies about 3 kilometres (1.9 mi) north of the village of Haugsbygda.

The 0.31-square-kilometre (77-acre) village has a population (2024) of 214 and a population density of 690 inhabitants per square kilometre (1,800/sq mi).

Several companies are located in Gjerdsvika, including Stadt AS, Sanco shipping, John Gjerde AS (production of valves) and Sandanger AS, which produces canned food and fish food under the brand name "Sunnmøre".
