= Sande Municipality (Møre og Romsdal) =

Municipality in Møre og Romsdal, Norway

Sande Municipality Sande kommune
- Municipality
- Sandø herred (historic name)
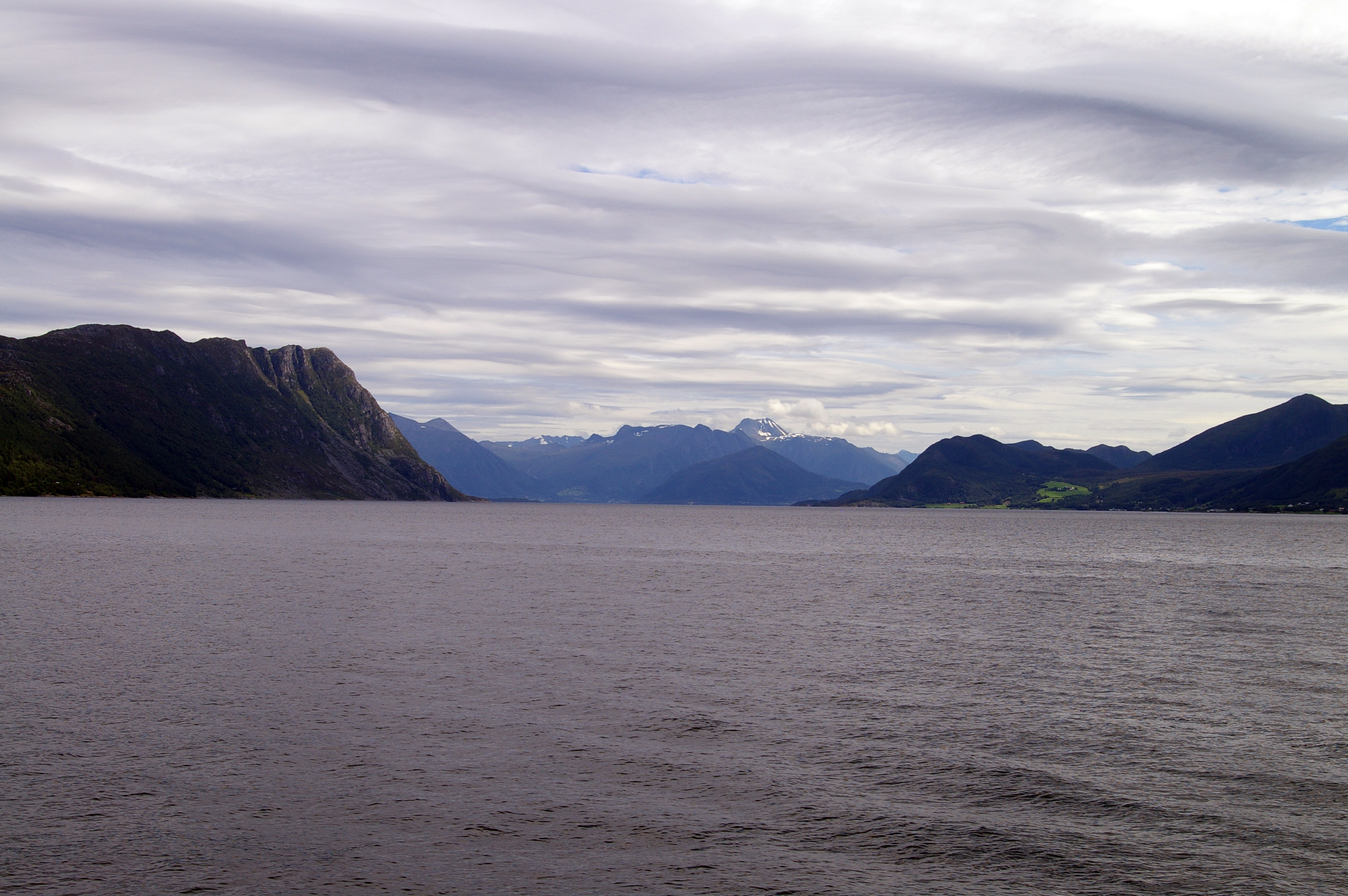
- View of the Rovdefjorden (Sande is to the left)

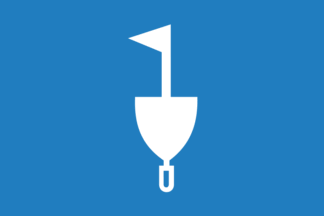
- Flag Coat of arms

- Møre og Romsdal within Norway

- Sande within Møre og Romsdal
- Coordinates: 62°15′30″N 05°25′53″E
- Country: Norway
- County: Møre og Romsdal
- District: Sunnmøre
- Established: 1 Jan 1867
  - Preceded by: Herøy Municipality
- Administrative centre: Larsnes

Government
  - Mayor (2023): Dag Arne Vaagen (H)

Area
  - Total: 93.24 km^{2} (36.00 sq mi)
  - Land: 90.17 km^{2} (34.81 sq mi)
  - Water: 3.07 km^{2} (1.19 sq mi) 3.3%
  - Rank: #332 in Norway
- Highest elevation: 659.83 m (2,164.8 ft)

Population (2024)
  - Total: 2,438
  - Rank: #261 in Norway
  - Density: 26.1/km^{2} (68/sq mi)
  - Change (10 years): ▼ −7.5%
- Demonym: Sandeværing

Official language
  - Norwegian form: Nynorsk
- Time zone: UTC+01:00 (CET)
  - Summer (DST): UTC+02:00 (CEST)
- ISO 3166 code: NO-1514
- Website: Official website

Sande is a municipality in Møre og Romsdal county, Norway. It is part of the Sunnmøre region. The administrative centre is the village of Larsnes on the island of Gurskøya. Other villages in Sande include Gjerdsvika, Haugsbygda, Sandshamn, Bringsinghaug, and Voksa.

The 93-square-kilometre (36 sq mi) municipality is the 332nd largest by area out of the 357 municipalities in Norway. Sande Municipality is the 261st most populous municipality in Norway with a population of 2,438. The municipality's population density is 26.1 inhabitants per square kilometre (68/sq mi) and its population has decreased by 7.5% over the previous 10-year period.

== General information ==
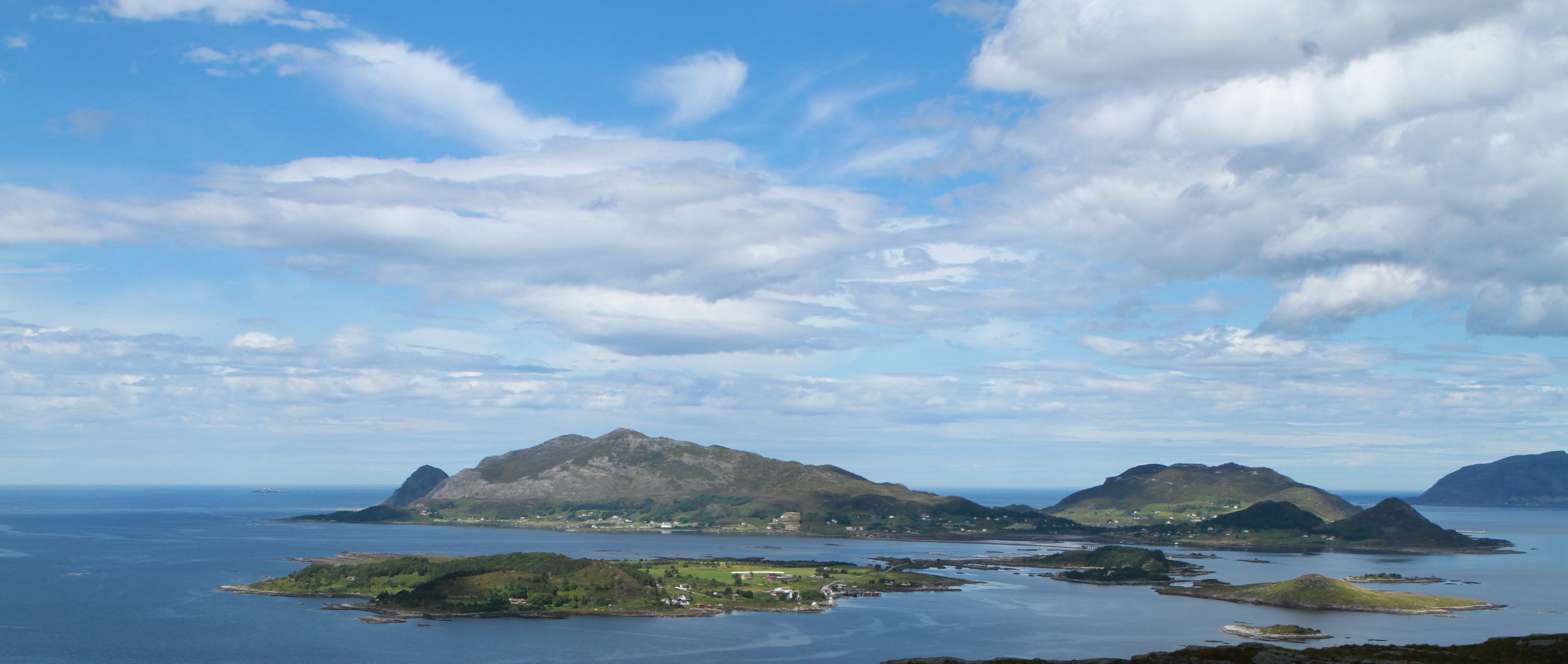
Sandsøy and Voksa islands

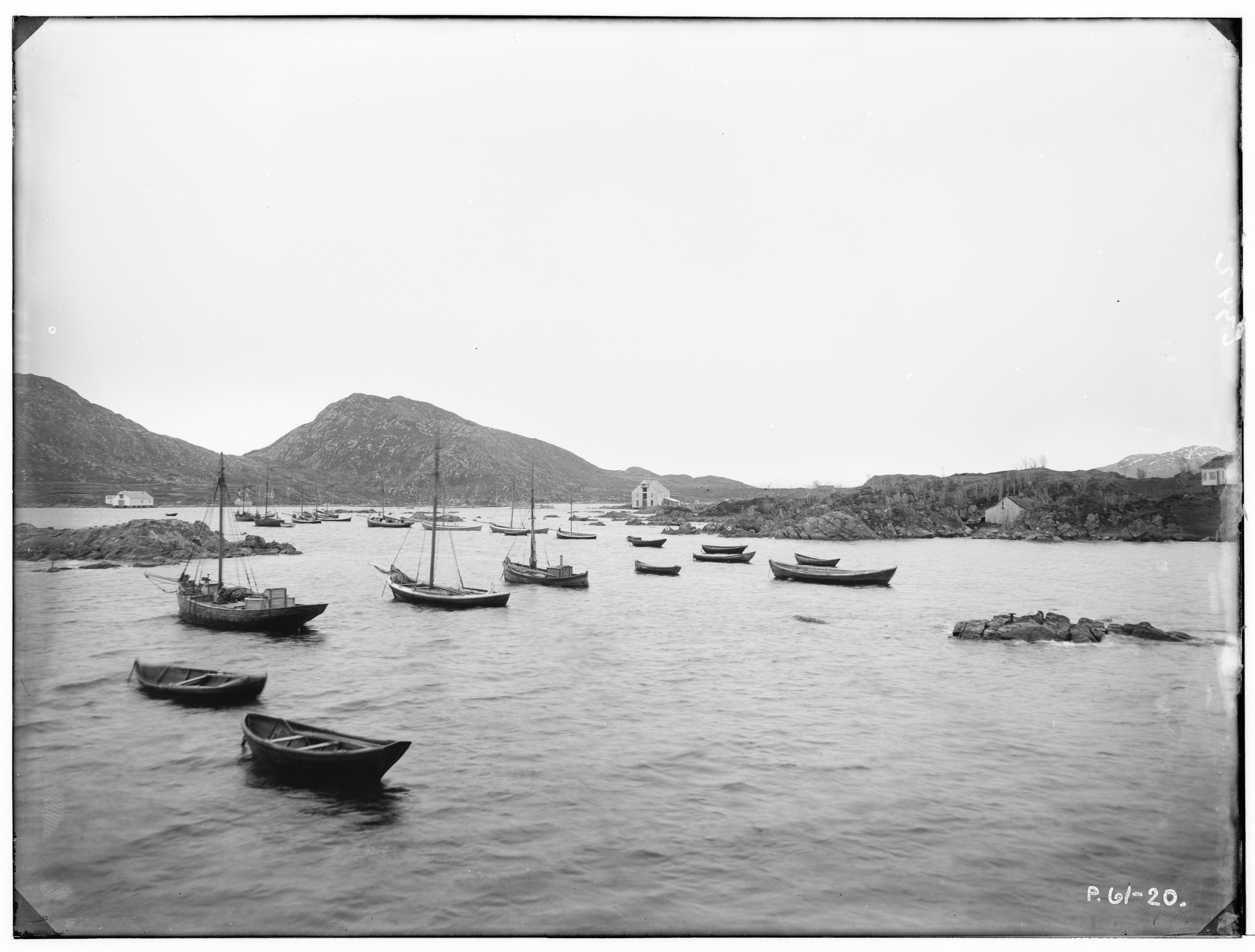
Sandshavn harbour (c. 1905)

Sande was established as a municipality on 1 January 1867 when it was separated from the large Herøy Municipality. The initial population was 2,493. On 1 January 1873, a part of eastern Sande Municipality (with 362 residents) was transferred back to Herøy Municipality. On 1 January 1889, the Eksund area and the island of Ekø (population: 119) were transferred to Herøy Municipality.

On 1 January 1905, the eastern district of Sande Municipality was separated to form the new Rovde Municipality. This left Sande Municipality with 2,221 residents. During the 1960s, there were many municipal mergers across Norway due to the work of the Schei Committee. On 1 January 1964, the northern part of Rovde Municipality (population: 562) plus three farms in the Gurskedalen valley (population: 25) were merged back with Sande Municipality (the southern part of Rovde was merged with Vanylven Municipality). The new Sande Municipality had a population of 3,465. On 1 January 2002, the Åram area (population: 380) on the mainland was transferred from Sande Municipality to Vanylven Municipality.

=== Name ===
The municipality (originally the parish) is named after the old Sande farm (Old Norse: Sandr) since the first Sande Church was built there. The name comes from the word sandr which means "sand" or "sandy beach". Before 1892, the name was written Sandø.

=== Coat of arms ===
The coat of arms was granted on 23 October 1987. The official blazon is "Azure, a line buoy argent" (Norwegian: På blå grunn ei sølv linebøye). This means the arms have a blue field (background) and the charge is a line buoy. The line buoy has a tincture of argent which means it is commonly colored white, but if it is made out of metal, then silver is used. The blue color in the field symbolizes the importance of the sea. This symbol was chosen since it was historically used by fishermen in ocean and fjords around the island municipality. The arms were designed by Jarle Skuseth who based it off an idea from Helge Kragseth. The municipal flag has the same design as the coat of arms.

=== Churches ===
The Church of Norway has two parishes (sokn) within Sande Municipality. It is part of the Søre Sunnmøre prosti (deanery) in the Diocese of Møre.

Churches in Sande Municipality
Parish (sokn)	Church name	Location of the church	Year built
Sande	Sande Church	Sande on Sandsøya	1880
Gursken	Gursken Church	Haugsbygda	1919
Gursken	Larsnes Chapel	Larsnes	1989

== Geography ==
Sande is composed of many islands including Sandsøya, Kvamsøya, Voksa, Riste, and part of Gurskøya (which is shared with neighboring Herøy). The highest point in the municipality is the 659.83-metre (2,164.8 ft) tall mountain Sollia which is located on the island of Gurskøya, along the border with Herøy Municipality. The island municipality sits north of the Rovdefjorden and east of the Vanylvsfjorden. The Haugsholmen Lighthouse sits in the southwest part of the municipality.

== Government ==
Sande Municipality is responsible for primary education (through 10th grade), outpatient health services, senior citizen services, welfare and other social services, zoning, economic development, and municipal roads and utilities. The municipality is governed by a municipal council of directly elected representatives. The mayor is indirectly elected by a vote of the municipal council. The municipality is under the jurisdiction of the Sunnmøre District Court and the Frostating Court of Appeal.

=== Municipal council ===
The municipal council (Kommunestyre) of Sande Municipality is made up of 21 representatives that are elected to four year terms. The tables below show the current and historical composition of the council by political party.

Sande kommunestyre 2023–2027
Party name (in Nynorsk)	Number of representatives
Labour Party (Arbeidarpartiet)	5
Progress Party (Framstegspartiet)	3
Conservative Party (Høgre)	9
Centre Party (Senterpartiet)	4
Total number of members:	21

Sande kommunestyre 2019–2023
Party name (in Nynorsk)	Number of representatives
Labour Party (Arbeidarpartiet)	4
Progress Party (Framstegspartiet)	3
Conservative Party (Høgre)	8
Centre Party (Senterpartiet)	4
Cross-party list: Kvamsøy, Sandsøy, Voksa (Tverrpolitisk liste: Kvamsøy, Sandsøy, Voksa)	2
Total number of members:	21

Sande kommunestyre 2015–2019
Party name (in Nynorsk)	Number of representatives
Labour Party (Arbeidarpartiet)	5
Progress Party (Framstegspartiet)	2
Conservative Party (Høgre)	7
Centre Party (Senterpartiet)	2
Liberal Party (Venstre)	1
Cross-party list: Kvamsøy, Sandsøy, Voksa (Tverrpolitisk liste: Kvamsøy, Sandsøy, Voksa)	4
Total number of members:	21

Sande kommunestyre 2011–2015
Party name (in Nynorsk)	Number of representatives
Labour Party (Arbeidarpartiet)	2
Progress Party (Framstegspartiet)	2
Conservative Party (Høgre)	8
Christian Democratic Party (Kristeleg Folkeparti)	1
Centre Party (Senterpartiet)	2
Liberal Party (Venstre)	2
Cross-party list: Kvamsøy, Sandsøy, Voksa (Tverrpolitisk liste: Kvamsøy, Sandsøy, Voksa)	4
Total number of members:	21

Sande kommunestyre 2007–2011
Party name (in Nynorsk)	Number of representatives
Labour Party (Arbeidarpartiet)	2
Progress Party (Framstegspartiet)	3
Conservative Party (Høgre)	5
Christian Democratic Party (Kristeleg Folkeparti)	2
Centre Party (Senterpartiet)	4
Cross-party list for Kvamsøy, Sandsøy, and Voksa (Tverrpolitisk liste for Kvamsøy, Sandsøy og Voksa)	5
Total number of members:	21

Sande kommunestyre 2003–2007
Party name (in Nynorsk)	Number of representatives
Labour Party (Arbeidarpartiet)	2
Progress Party (Framstegspartiet)	3
Conservative Party (Høgre)	4
Christian Democratic Party (Kristeleg Folkeparti)	2
Centre Party (Senterpartiet)	3
Socialist Left Party (Sosialistisk Venstreparti)	3
Cross-party list for Kvamsøy, Sandsøy, and Voksa (Tverrpolitisk liste for Kvamsøy, Sandsøy og Voksa)	4
Total number of members:	21

Sande kommunestyre 1999–2003
Party name (in Nynorsk)	Number of representatives
Labour Party (Arbeidarpartiet)	4
Conservative Party (Høgre)	8
Christian Democratic Party (Kristeleg Folkeparti)	4
Centre Party (Senterpartiet)	1
Cross-party list for Åram, Kvamsøy, and Sandsøy (Tverrpolitisk liste for Åram, Kvamsøy og Sandsøy)	7
Local list for Gjerdsvika (Bygdaliste for Gjerdsvika)	5
Total number of members:	29

Sande kommunestyre 1995–1999
Party name (in Nynorsk)	Number of representatives
Labour Party (Arbeidarpartiet)	3
Conservative Party (Høgre)	5
Christian Democratic Party (Kristeleg Folkeparti)	3
Centre Party (Senterpartiet)	1
Liberal Party (Venstre)	1
Cross-party list for Åram, Kvamsøy, and Sandsøy (Tverrpolitisk liste for Åram, Kvamsøy og Sandsøy)	9
Election list for Gjerdsvika, Haugsbygda, and Vågen (Valliste for Gjerdsvika, Haugsbygda og Vågen)	7
Total number of members:	29

Sande kommunestyre 1991–1995
Party name (in Nynorsk)	Number of representatives
Labour Party (Arbeidarpartiet)	1
Conservative Party (Høgre)	5
Christian Democratic Party (Kristeleg Folkeparti)	3
Centre Party (Senterpartiet)	1
Socialist Left Party (Sosialistisk Venstreparti)	1
Liberal Party (Venstre)	1
Cross-party list for Åram, Kvamsøy, and Sandsøy (Tverrpolitisk liste for Åram, Kvamsøy og Sandsøy)	9
Election list for Gjerdsvika, Haugsbygda, and Vågen (Valliste for Gjerdsvika, Haugsbygda og Vågen)	8
Total number of members:	29

Sande kommunestyre 1987–1991
Party name (in Nynorsk)	Number of representatives
Labour Party (Arbeidarpartiet)	4
Conservative Party (Høgre)	5
Christian Democratic Party (Kristeleg Folkeparti)	5
Centre Party (Senterpartiet)	1
Socialist Left Party (Sosialistisk Venstreparti)	1
Liberal Party (Venstre)	2
Cross-party list for Åram, Kvamsøy, and Sandsøy (Tverrrpolitisk liste for Åram, Kvamsøy og Sandsøy)	11
Total number of members:	29

Sande kommunestyre 1983–1987
Party name (in Nynorsk)	Number of representatives
Labour Party (Arbeidarpartiet)	6
Conservative Party (Høgre)	6
Christian Democratic Party (Kristeleg Folkeparti)	7
Centre Party (Senterpartiet)	3
Liberal Party (Venstre)	5
List for Hakallestranda and Sørbrandal (Liste for Hakallestranda og Sørbrandal)	2
Total number of members:	29

Sande kommunestyre 1979–1983
Party name (in Nynorsk)	Number of representatives
Labour Party (Arbeidarpartiet)	4
Conservative Party (Høgre)	7
Christian Democratic Party (Kristeleg Folkeparti)	9
Centre Party (Senterpartiet)	4
Liberal Party (Venstre)	5
Common list for Hallebygda, Larsnes, and Skredestranda (Samlingsliste for Hallebygda, Larsnes og Skredestranda)	1
Election list for the Åram area (Valliste for Åram krets)	3
Total number of members:	33

Sande kommunestyre 1975–1979
Party name (in Nynorsk)	Number of representatives
Labour Party (Arbeidarpartiet)	3
Conservative Party (Høgre)	2
Local list for Kvamsøy (Krinsliste for Kvamsøy)	3
Election list for the Åram area (Valliste for Åram Krins)	3
Joint list of the Centre Party (Senterpartiet), Christian Democratic Party (Kristeleg Folkeparti), and Liberal Party (Venstre)	11
Local list for Sandsøy and Voksa (Krinsliste for Sandsøy og Voksa)	1
Election list for the Gjerdsvika area (Valliste for Gjerdsvika krins)	2
Common list for V[gen and Haugsbygda (Samlingsliste for Vågen og Haugsbygda)	5
Common list for Halleberg, Larsnes and Skredestranda (Samlingsliste for Halleberg, Larsnes og Skredestranda)	3
Total number of members:	33

Sande kommunestyre 1971–1975
Party name (in Nynorsk)	Number of representatives
Labour Party (Arbeidarpartiet)	3
Conservative Party (Høgre)	2
Christian Democratic Party (Kristeleg Folkeparti)	4
Centre Party (Senterpartiet)	5
Liberal Party (Venstre)	5
Local List(s) (Lokale lister)	14
Total number of members:	33

Sande kommunestyre 1967–1971
Party name (in Nynorsk)	Number of representatives
Labour Party (Arbeidarpartiet)	5
Conservative Party (Høgre)	3
Christian Democratic Party (Kristeleg Folkeparti)	9
Centre Party (Senterpartiet)	6
Liberal Party (Venstre)	10
Total number of members:	33

Sande kommunestyre 1963–1967
Party name (in Nynorsk)	Number of representatives
Local List(s) (Lokale lister)	33
Total number of members:	33

Sande heradsstyre 1959–1963
Party name (in Nynorsk)	Number of representatives
Local List(s) (Lokale lister)	33
Total number of members:	33

Sande heradsstyre 1955–1959
Party name (in Nynorsk)	Number of representatives
List of workers, fishermen, and small farmholders (Arbeidarar, fiskarar, småbrukarar liste)	2
Local List(s) (Lokale lister)	31
Total number of members:	33

Sande heradsstyre 1951–1955
Party name (in Nynorsk)	Number of representatives
Local List(s) (Lokale lister)	32
Total number of members:	32

Sande heradsstyre 1947–1951
Party name (in Nynorsk)	Number of representatives
Local List(s) (Lokale lister)	32
Total number of members:	32

Sande heradsstyre 1945–1947
Party name (in Nynorsk)	Number of representatives
Local List(s) (Lokale lister)	32
Total number of members:	32

Sande heradsstyre 1937–1941*
Party name (in Nynorsk)	Number of representatives
Labour Party (Arbeidarpartiet)	7
Local List(s) (Lokale lister)	25
Total number of members:	32
Note: Due to the German occupation of Norway during World War II, no elections were held for new municipal councils until after the war ended in 1945.

=== Mayors ===
The mayor (Nynorsk: ordførar) of Sande Municipality is the political leader of the municipality and the chairperson of the municipal council. Here is a list of people who have held this position:

- 1867–1870: Knut R. Bjørlykke
- 1871–1880: Bendt L. Redse
- 1881–1898: Rasmus K. Sætre
- 1899–1905: Daniel D. Liset
- 1905–1919: Hans J. Aaram
- 1920–1922: Ole S. Dyrkoren
- 1923–1937: August A. Kragset
- 1938–1941: Jakob Sætre
- 1941–1941: Torvald Baade (NS)
- 1941–1945: Oskar Sandanger (NS)
- 1945–1947: Jakob Sætre
- 1948–1951: Sverre Myklebust
- 1952–1955: Torvald Baade
- 1956–1957: Sverre Myklebust
- 1958–1975: Petter H. Kragset (V)
- 1976–1981: John Gjerde (V)
- 1982–1983: Jon Martin Bringsvor (H)
- 1984–1987: John Gjerde (V)
- 1988–2003: Arne Dyrhol (H)
- 2003–2007: Jon Garen (Sp)
- 2007–2019: Dag Arne Vaagen (H)
- 2019–2023: Olav Myklebust (Sp)
- 2023–present: Dag Arne Vaagen (H)

== Notable people ==
- Ingolf Rogde (1911 in Haugsholmen, Sande – 1978), an actor with the touring theatre Riksteatret
- Bjartmar Gjerde (1931 in Larsnes, Sande – 2009), a politician, government minister, and DG of the Norwegian Broadcasting Corporation
- Odd S. Lovoll (born 1934 in Sande), a Norwegian-American author, historian, educator, and academic
- Morten Schakenda (born 1966 in Gjerdsvika, Sande), a cook and leading chef
- Jan Åge Fjørtoft (born 1967 in Gursken, Sande), a former footballer with 497 club caps and 71 for Norway

== Gallery ==
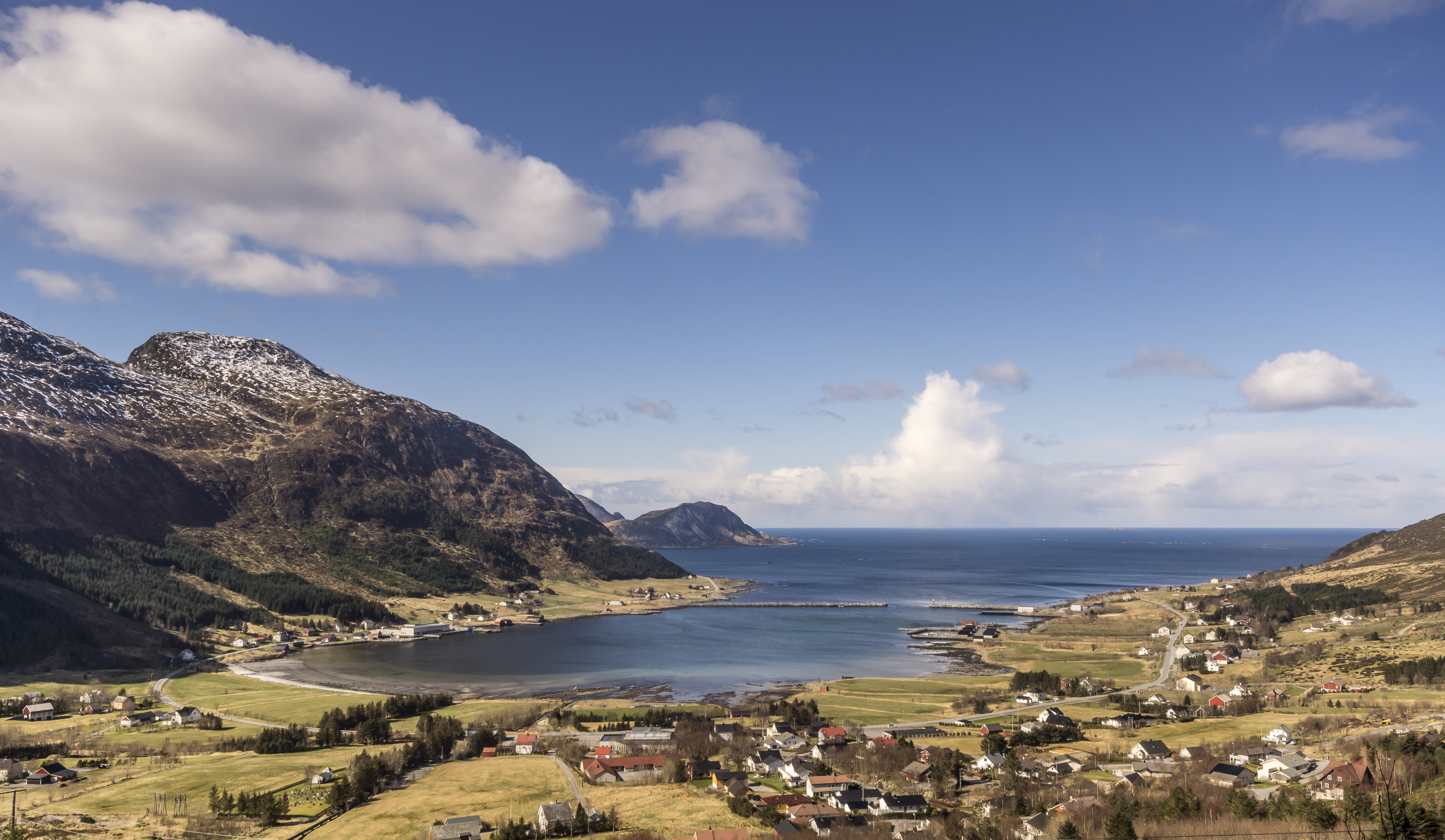
Gjerdsvika

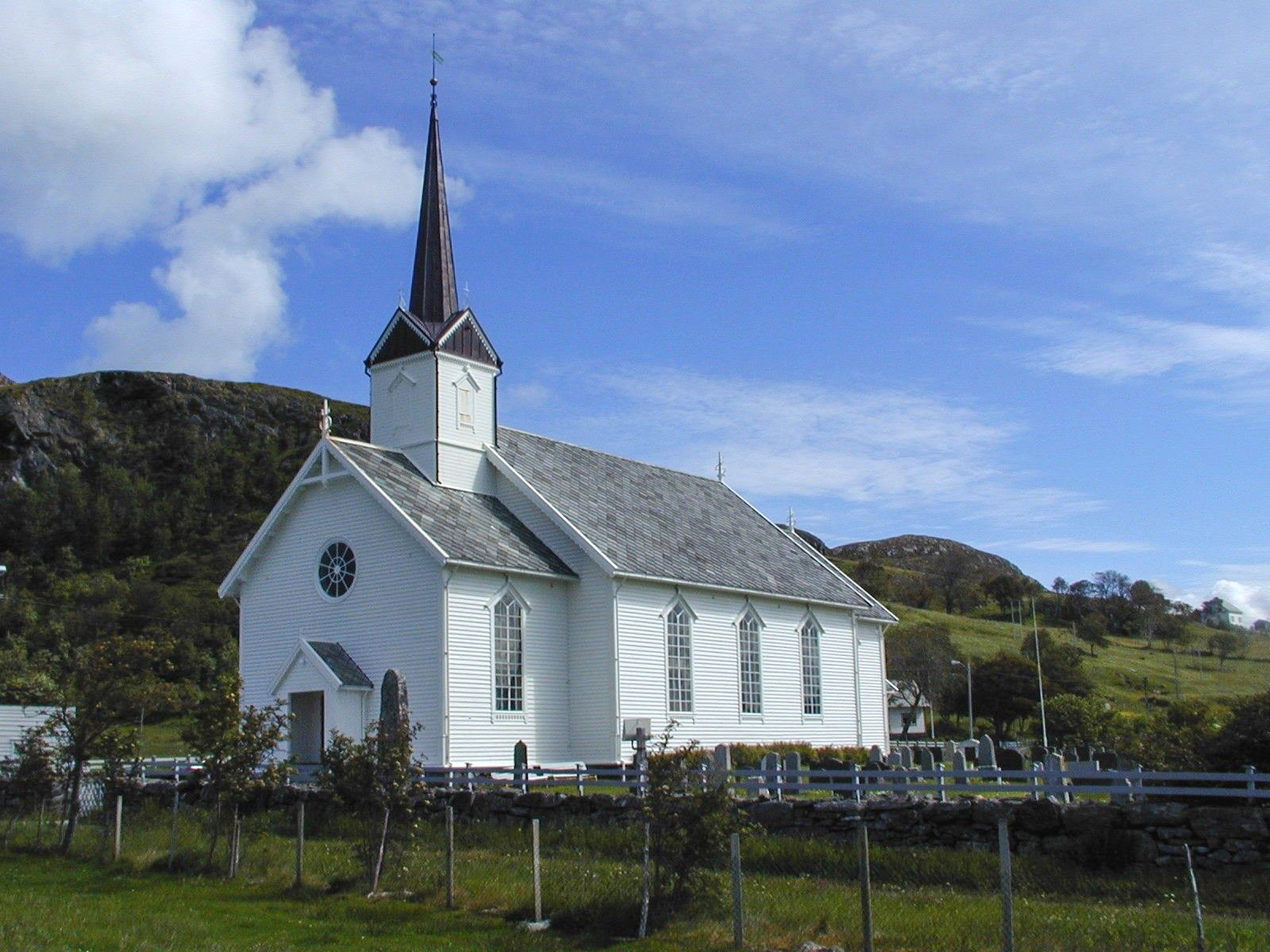
Sande Church

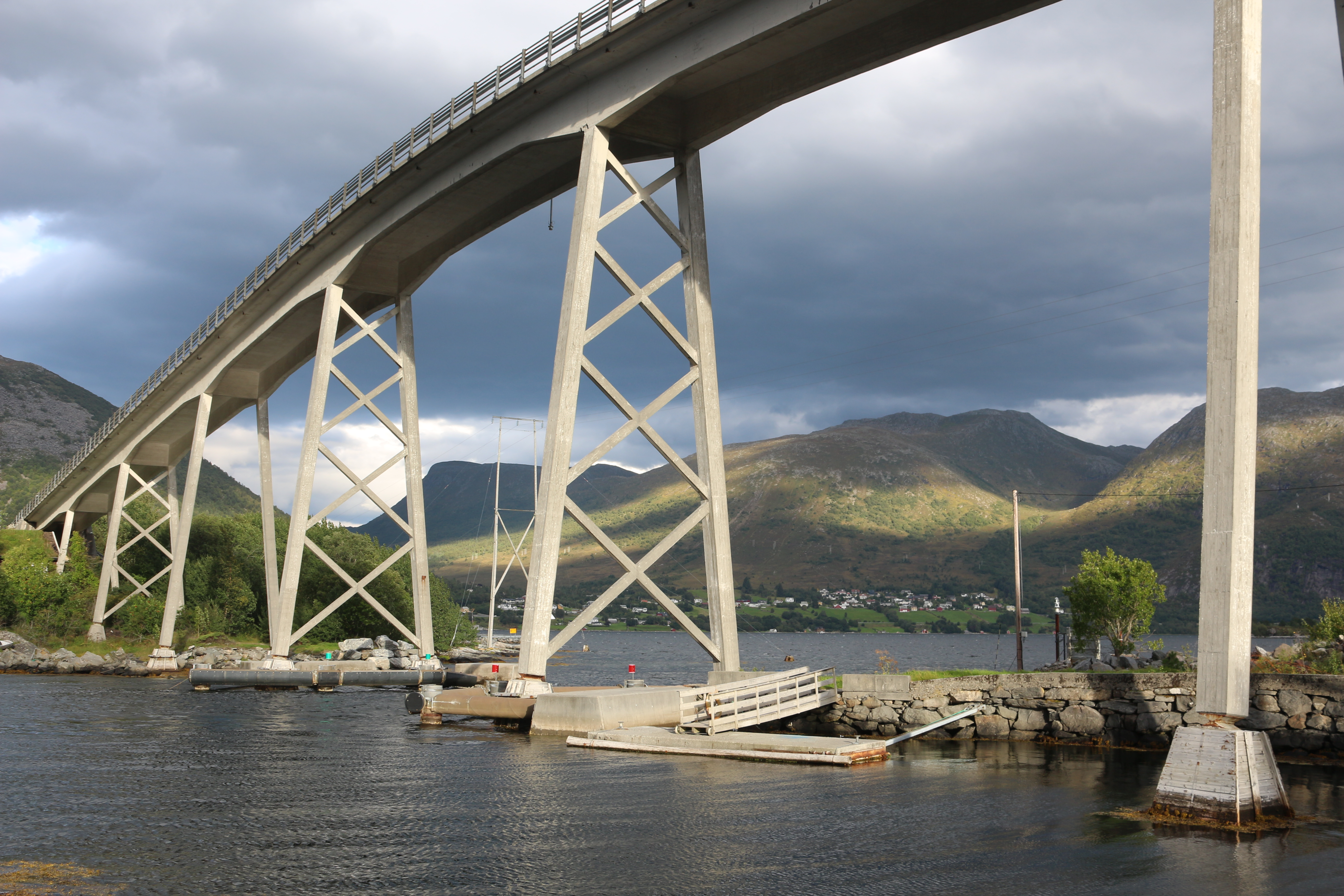
Dragsundbrua Access South
