= Kvamsøya, Møre og Romsdal =

Island in Møre og Romsdal, Norway

Kvamsøya
- Interactive map of Kvamsøya

Geography
- Location: Møre og Romsdal, Norway
- Coordinates: 62.2120°N 5.3702°E
- Area: 7.5 km^{2} (2.9 sq mi)
- Length: 3.6 km (2.24 mi)
- Width: 3.9 km (2.42 mi)
- Highest elevation: 289 m (948 ft)
- Highest point: Nonshornet

Administration
- Norway
- County: Møre og Romsdal
- Municipality: Sande Municipality

Demographics
- Population: 226 (202)

Kvamsøya is an island in Sande Municipality in Møre og Romsdal county, Norway. It is located 6 kilometres (3.7 mi) east of the Stad peninsula in Stad Municipality and about 7 kilometres (4.3 mi) west of the village of Larsnes on the island of Gurskøya. The island lies in the Vanylvsgapet, the entrance to the Vanylvsfjorden.

The island has been inhabited for a very long time. There have been settlements found on the island dating back to the Bronze Age. Kvamsøya has an area of 7.5 square kilometres (2.9 sq mi) and 226 inhabitants (2020), all of whom live along the shoreline. The largest population centre on the island is the village of Bringsinghaug. There is a ferry connection from Bringsinghaug to Voksa and on to Åram (in Vanylven Municipality) and then to Larsnes. The island of Kvamsøya is mountainous and has very few trees on it.
