= Gurskøya =

Island in Møre og Romsdal, Norway

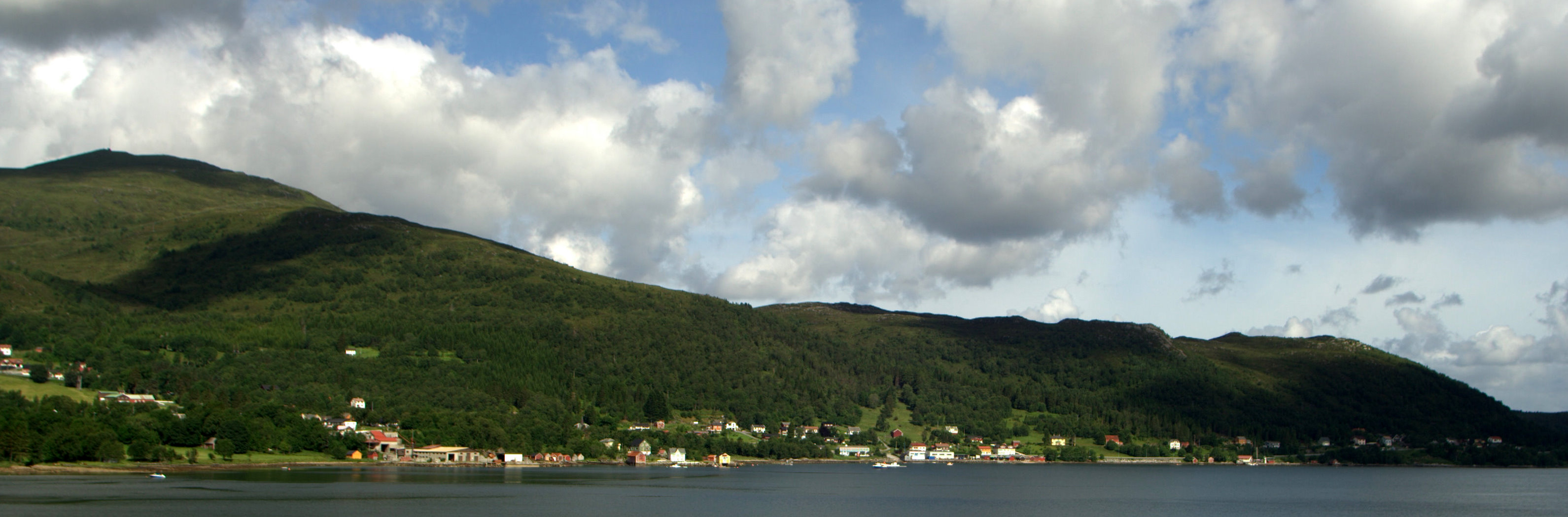
- View of the Leikong area on the east coast of the island.
- Interactive map of Gurskøya

Geography
- Location: Møre og Romsdal, Norway
- Coordinates: 62.2086°N 5.6381°E
- Area: 137 km^{2} (53 sq mi)
- Length: 11 km (6.8 mi)
- Width: 16.5 km (10.25 mi)
- Highest elevation: 660 m (2170 ft)
- Highest point: Sollia

Administration
- Norway
- County: Møre og Romsdal
- Municipality: Herøy Municipality and Sande Municipality

Demographics
- Population: 4647 (2015)

Gurskøya is an island in Møre og Romsdal county, Norway.

== Settlements ==
The 137-square-kilometre (53 sq mi) island is shared by Sande Municipality and Herøy Municipality. The villages of Haugsbygda, Gjerdsvika, Larsnes, Leikong and Moldtustranda are located on the island. The southern part of the island was historically part of the old Rovde Municipality. In 2015, there were 4,647 residents living on the island.

The island is home to many fish-related industries such as fishing and fish processing.

== Location ==
The island lies north of the Rovdestranda area on the mainland; southwest of the islands of Hareidlandet and Dimnøya, west of the island of Eika; east of the islands of Kvamsøya, Voksa, and Sandsøya; and south of the Norwegian Sea and the islands of Nerlandsøya, Bergsøya, Leinøya, and Flåværet.

== Notable residents ==
- Anne Leer, an author
- Anlaug Amanda Djupvik, an astronomer

== See also ==
- List of islands of Norway
- List of islands of Norway by area
