= 1906 in Norway =

- Centuries: 18th; 19th; 20th; 21st
- Decades: 1880s; 1890s; 1900s; 1910s; 1920s
- See also: List of years in Norway

Events in the year 1906 in Norway.

== Incumbents ==
- Monarch – Haakon VII.
- Prime Minister of Norway – Christian Michelsen

== Events ==
- 12 January - Mining starts at A/S Sydvaranger in Finnmark.
- 4–5 February - Noregs Mållag is founded in Kristiania.
- 1 March - The steamship "Thor" sinks near Lyngholmen in Sveio Municipality, 39 people perish.
- 2 March - The Second Gjæsling Accident: 25 fishermen is killed in a storm in the fjord Folda, Trøndelag.
- 2 March - The first Norwegian Blue Cross association is founded in Kristiania.
- 8 March - 19 people perish in an avalanche close to the fishing village Steine in Lofoten.
- 22 June – Haakon VII and Maud of Wales are crowned monarch and consort of Norway in the Nidaros Cathedral.
- 27 June - Coop Norge is established.
- 4 September - The Norwegian explorer Roald Amundsen completed a three-year voyage through the Northwest Passage in the converted herring boat Gjøa, after being trapped in ice for three winters.
- The 1906 Parliamentary election takes place.
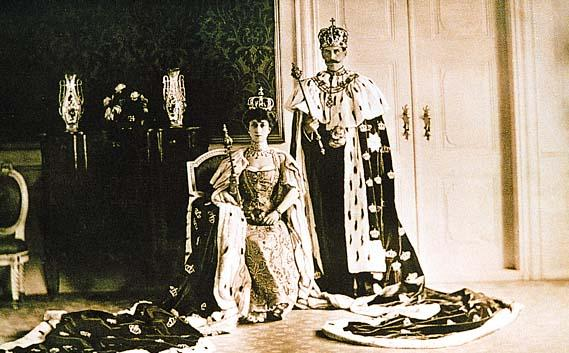
The coronation of King Haakon VII and Queen Maud on 22 June 1906

== Popular culture ==
=== Sports ===
- 28 August – Moss FK football club is founded.

=== Literature ===
- The Knut Hamsund novel Under Høststjærnen. En Vandrers Fortælling (Under the Autumn Star), was published.

== Notable births ==
=== January to June ===
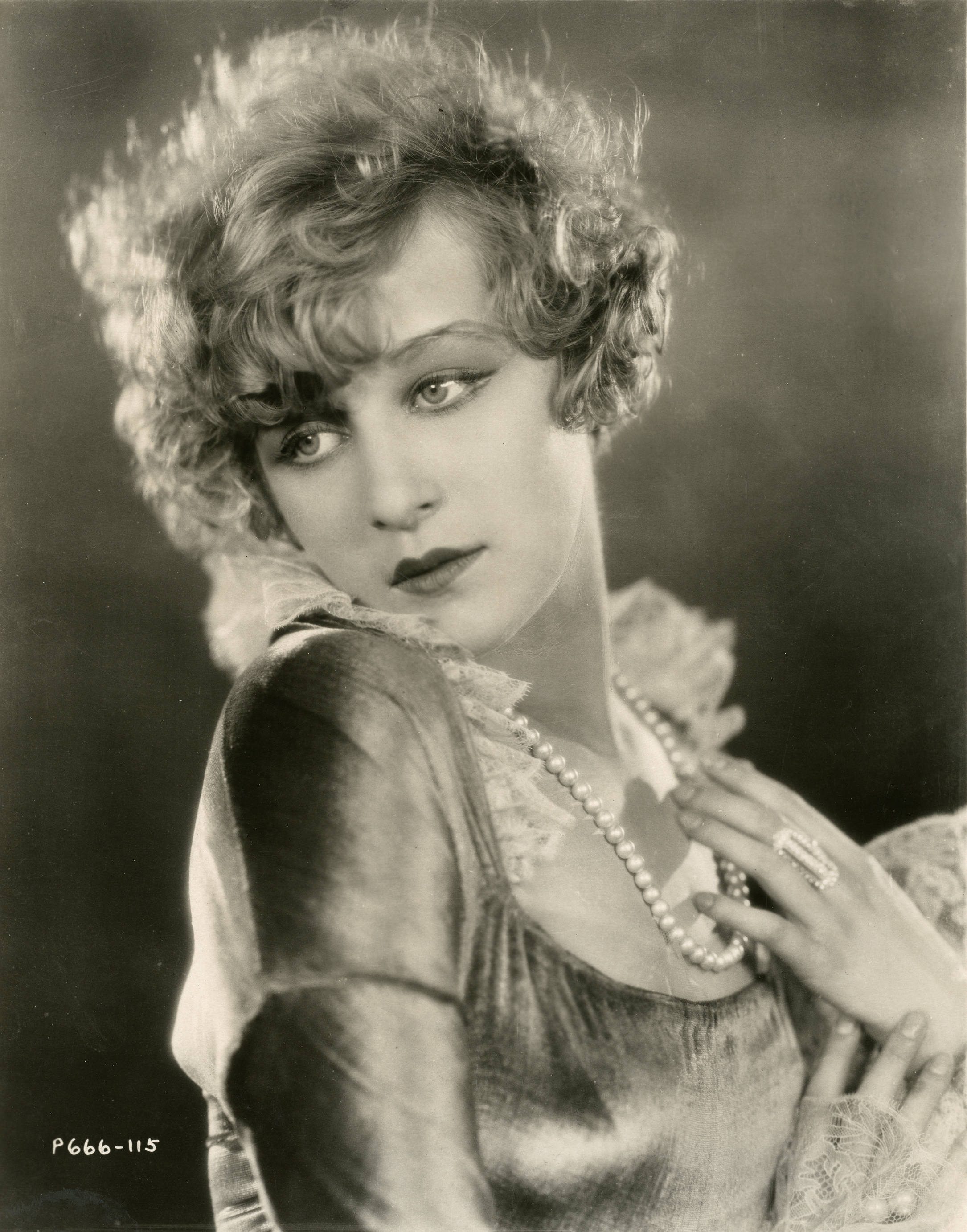
Greta Nissen

- 9 January – Leif Larsen, naval officer (died 1990)
- 30 January – Greta Nissan, actress (died 1988)
- 31 January – Jørgen Adolf Lier, politician (died 1994)
- 17 February – Henrik Selberg, mathematician (died 1993).
- 1 April – Sigve Lie, sailor and twice Olympic gold medallist (died 1958)
- 6 April – Bernt Østerkløft, Nordic combined skier (died 1996)
- 20 April – Johan Jentoft Johansen, politician (died 1973)
- 29 April – Arthur Arntzen, politician (died 1997)
- 15 May – Alf Andersen, ski jumper and Olympic gold medallist (died 1975)
- 21 May – Astrid Sommer, actress (died 1990).
- 26 May – Fridtjov Søiland Birkeli, Lutheran missionary, writer, magazine editor, and bishop (died 1983).
- 29 May – Andreas Holm, politician (died 2003)
- 5 June – Andreas Holmsen, professor and historian (died 1989)
- 11 June – Sigurd Marius Johansen, politician (died 1989)
- 18 June – Nils Handal, politician and Minister (died 1992)
- 23 June – Holger Albrechtsen, hurdler (died 1992)

=== July to December ===
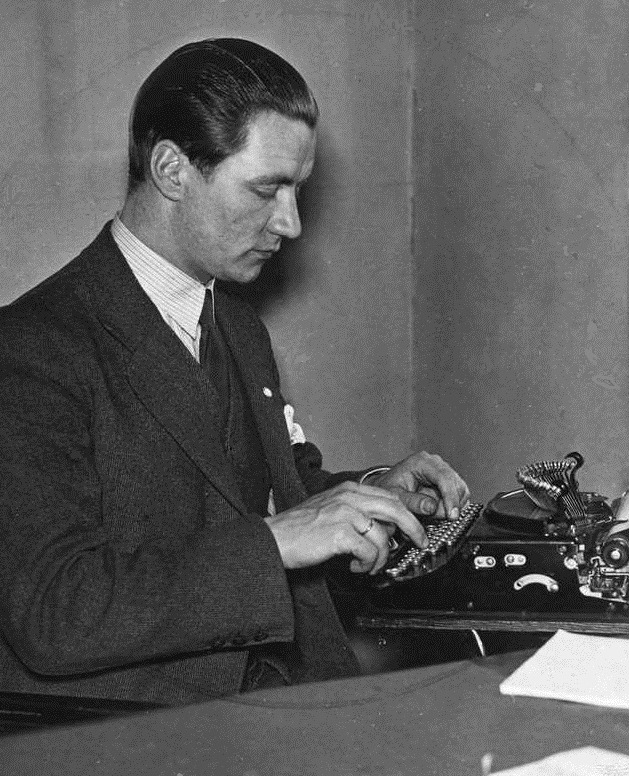
Jørgen Juve

- 13 July – Erling Petersen, economist and politician (died 1992)
- 19 July – Klaus Egge, composer and music critic (died 1979)
- 9 August – Atle Roll-Matthiesen, judge.
- 11 August – Haakon Lind, boxer (died 1955)
- 13 August – Kjellaug Hølaas, textile artist and educator (died 1990).
- 15 August – Asle Enger, priest (died 2000).
- 15 August – Gunvor Katharina Eker, politician (died 1980)
- 16 August – Harald Damsleth, cartoonist, illustrator and ad-man (died 1971)
- 24 August – Otto Berg, long jumper (died 1991)
- 21 September – Lauritz Johnson, novelist, children's writer, and radio and television host (died 1992).
- 9 October – Rolf Hansen, long distance runner (died 1980)
- 9 October – Haakon Pedersen, speed skater (died 1991)
- 11 October – Olaf Hansen, boxer (died 1986)
- 17 October – Brynjulf Bull, lawyer, Supreme Court advocate and politician (died 1993)
- 13 November – Torborg Nedreaas, author (died 1987)
- 22 November – Jørgen Juve, international soccer player and Olympic bronze medallist (died 1983)
- 1 December – Jakob Sande, writer, poet and folk singer (died 1967)
- 8 December – Borghild Bondevik Haga, politician (died 1990)

=== Full date unknown ===
- Caroline Mikkelsen, first woman to set foot on Antarctica
- Arne Skaug, politician and Minister (died 1974)
- Egil Lindberg, radio officer and intelligence agent (died 1952).

== Notable deaths ==
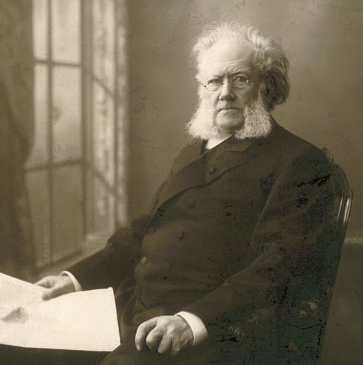
Henrik Ibsen

- 16 January – Brita Bjørgum, writer, teacher and women's rights activist (born 1858)
- 21 February – Walter Scott Dahl, politician and Minister (born 1839)
- 8 March – Johannes Bergh, barrister (born 1837).
- 6 April – Alexander Kielland, novelist (born 1849)
- 14 April – Ole Irgens, politician (born 1829)
- 15 April – Anders Bull, politician and Minister (born 1817)
- 23 May – Henrik Ibsen, playwright (born 1828)
- 9 October – Henriette Wulfsberg, school owner and writer (born 1843).
- 26 October – Rolf Andvord, shipowner and consul (born 1847)
- 5 November – Frits Thaulow, painter (born 1847)
- 6 November –Gyda Gram, painter (born 1851).
