= 1902 in Norway =

- Centuries: 18th; 19th; 20th; 21st
- Decades: 1880s; 1890s; 1900s; 1910s; 1920s
- See also: 1902 in Sweden; List of years in Norway

Events in the year 1902 in Norway.

== Incumbents ==
- Monarch: Oscar II.
- Prime Minister: Johannes Steen, then Otto Blehr

== Events ==
- 15 November – The Ofoten Line opened.
- 23 November – The Valdres Line opened.
- Oslo Police Museum is established.
- The town of Victoriahavn changed its name to Narvik.

== Popular culture ==
=== Sports ===
- Football Association of Norway is founded.

== Notable births ==
=== January to March ===
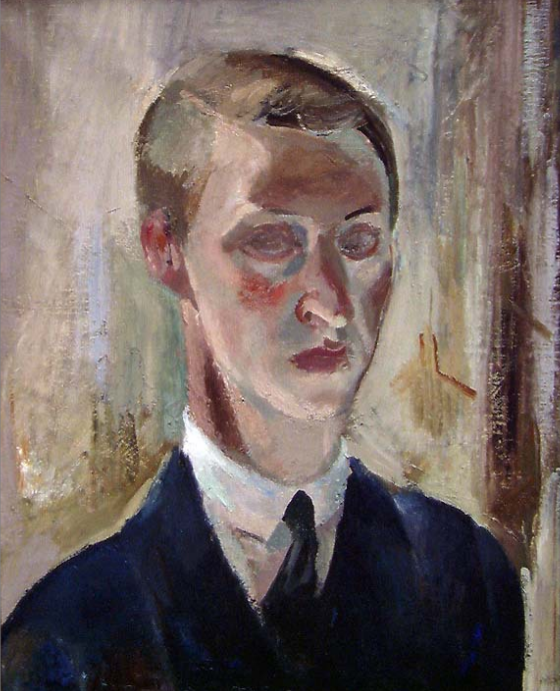
Bjarne Ness (self portrait)

- 6 January – Erik Harry Johannessen, painter (died 1980).
- 15 January – Olaug Hay, politician (died 2000)
- 24 January – Sigurd Lund Hamran, politician (died 1977)
- 30 January – Magnus Jensen, historian and educator (died 1990).
- 12 February – Henry Wilhelm Kristiansen, newspaper editor and politician (died 1942)
- 25 February – Hans Berg, politician (died 1980)
- 15 March – Harald Hagen, sailor and Olympic gold medallist (died 1970)
- 17 March – Bjarne Ness, painter and illustrator (died 1927).
- 22 March – Petter Jacob Semb Meyer, judge and politician (died 1987).

=== April to June ===
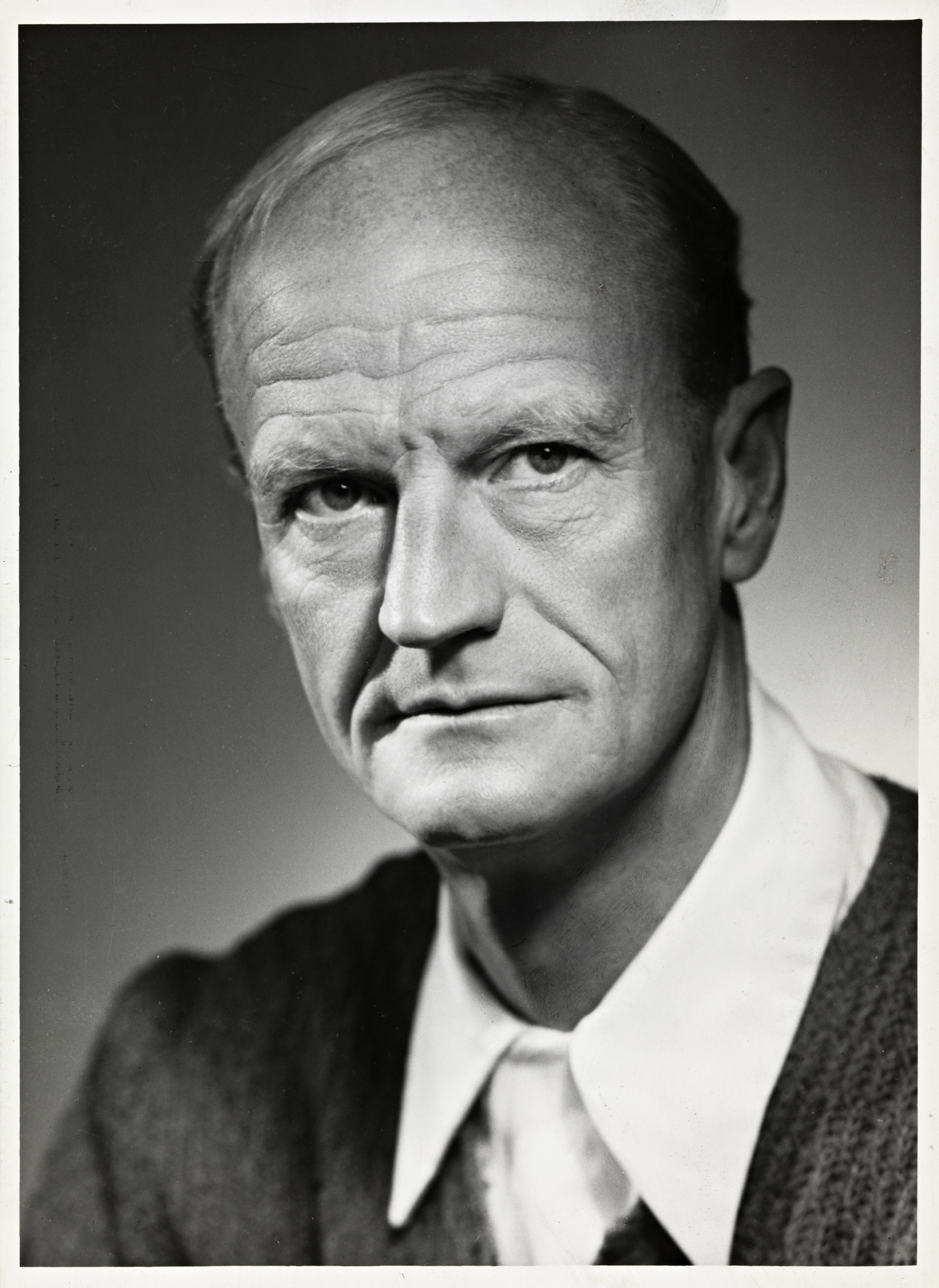
Johan Borgen

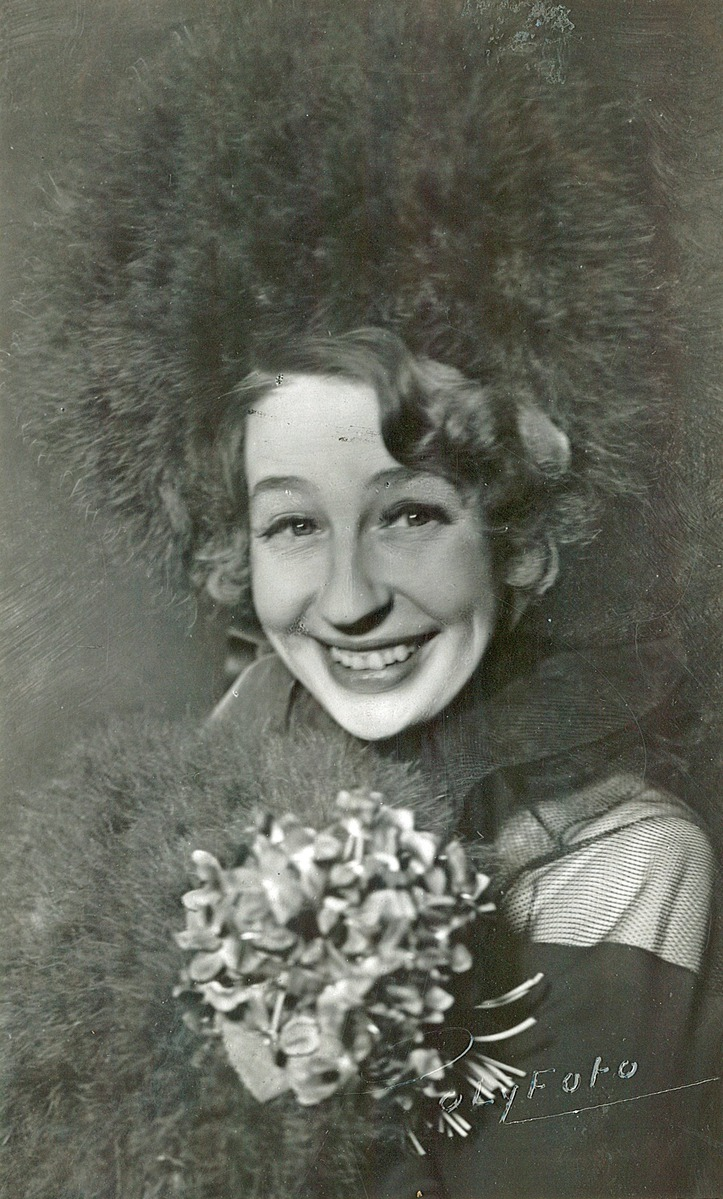
Elisabeth Reiss

- 3 April – Dagmar Maalstad, politician (died 2000)
- 4 April – Sverre Hope, politician (died 1966)
- 5 April – Olav Nielsen, boxer (died 1944)
- 6 April – Gustav Sjaastad, politician and Minister (died 1964)
- 12 April – Finn Øen, politician (died 1979)
- 18 April – Gulborg Nygaard, politician (died 1991)
- 24 April – Hans Struksnæs, sailor and Olympic silver medallist (died 1983)
- 25 April – Per Aabel, comic actor (died 1999)
- 28 April – Johan Borgen, author, journalist and critic (died 1979)
- 5 May – Johan Andersen, politician (died 1968)
- 17 May – Nils Lie, writer, literary consultant and translator (died 1978).
- 21 May – Asbjørn Øye, politician (died 1998)
- 23 May – Lars Tangvik, politician (died 1991)
- 14 June – Elisabeth Reiss, pianist and cabaret performer (died 1970).
- 18 June – John Rognes, military officer (died 1949).

=== July to September ===
- 11 July – Rolf Wideröe, particle physicist (died 1996)
- 23 July – Kaare Strøm, limnologist (died 1967)
- 1 August – Peder Kjellberg, boxer (died 1975)
- 9 August – Anton Rønneberg, writer, theatre critic, dramaturg and theatre director (died 1989).
- 14 August – Otto Carlmar, film producer, writer and actor (died 1987)
- 18 August – Ole Bae, civil servant (died 1972)
- 2 September – Peter Torleivson Molaug, politician (died 1985)
- 16 September – Halvard Lange, diplomat, politician and Minister (died 1970)

=== October to December ===
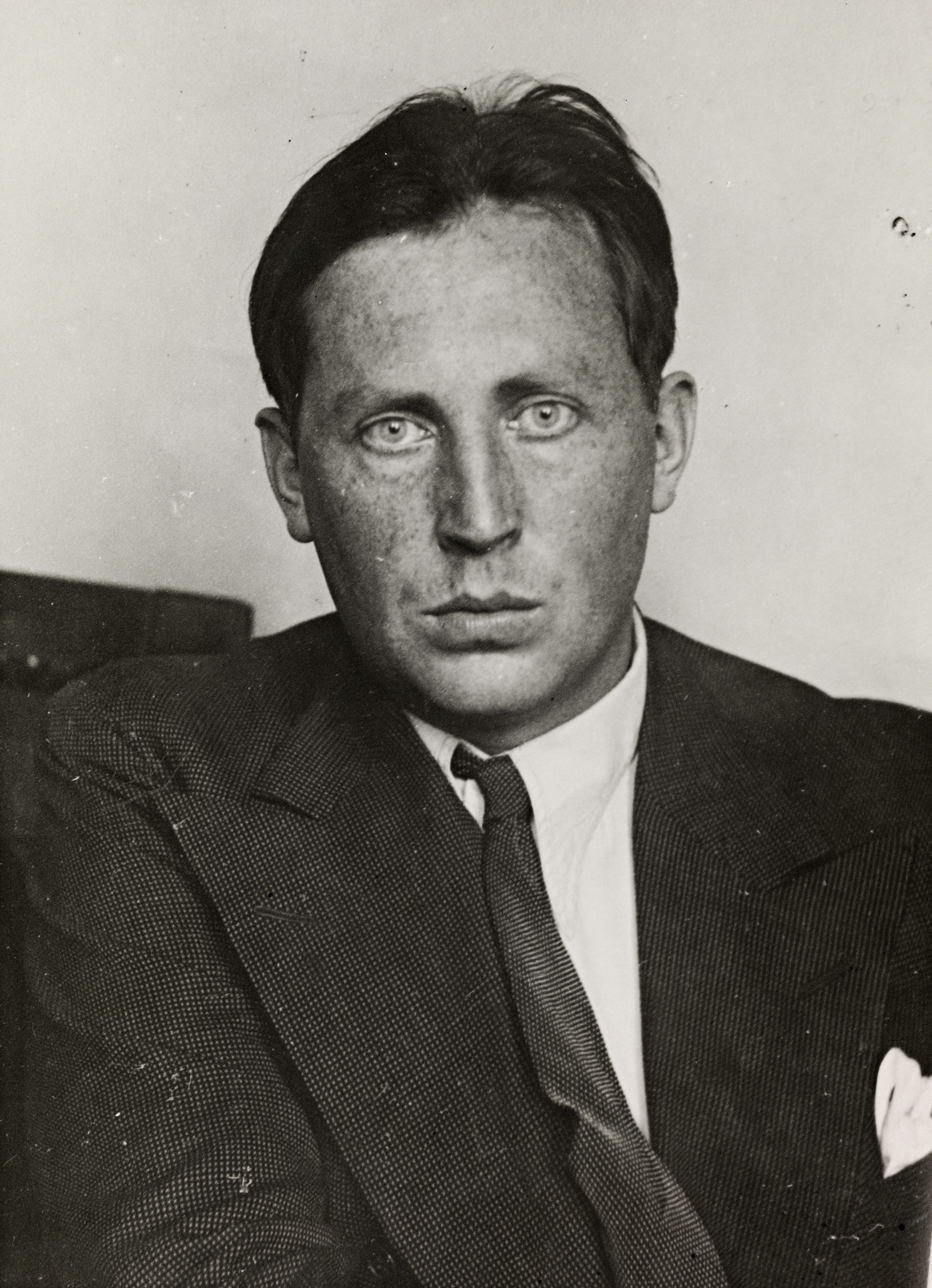
Nordahl Grieg

- 1 October – Jon Snersrud, skier and Olympic bronze medallist (died 1986)
- 5 October – Vaadjuv Nyqvist, sailor and Olympic silver medallist (died 1961)
- 10 October – Sigurd Monssen, rower and Olympic bronze medallist (died 1990).
- 11 October – Bent Røiseland, politician (died 1981)
- 12 October – Bernt Ingvaldsen, politician (died 1985)
- 12 October – Finn Moe, politician (died 1971)
- 12 October – Steffen Ingebriktsen Toppe, politician (died 1979)
- 1 November – Nordahl Grieg, poet, novelist, dramatist, and journalist (died 1943)
- 8 November – Jørgen Holmboe, meteorologist (died 1979)
- 16 November – Hjalmar Hvam, Nordic skier and inventor of the first safety ski binding (died 1996)
- 25 November – Trygve Stokstad, boxer (died 1979)
- 13 December – Halfdan Olaus Christophersen, historian (died 1980).
- 15 December – Hans Aasnæs, sport shooter (died 1965).
- 19 December – Johan Andreas Lippestad, NS politician (died 1961).
- 22 December – Hartvig Svendsen, politician (died 1971)

== Notable deaths ==
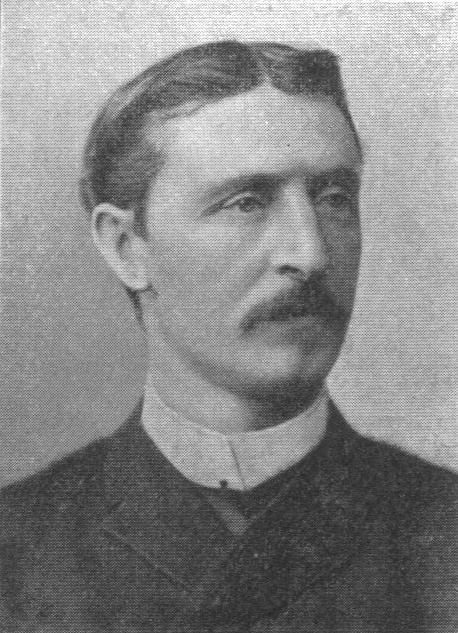
Oscar Jacobsen

- 6 January – Lars Hertervig, painter (born 1830)
- 17 January – Elias Blix, poet, musician, politician and Minister (born 1836)
- 18 February – Hans Christian Harboe Grønn, barrister and politician (born 1829).
- 26 May – Jacob Otto Lange, politician and Minister (born 1833)
- 6 August – Oscar Jacobsen, engineer and politician (born 1850)
- 6 October – Lucie Wolf, actress (born 1833).
- 12 October – Jacob Andreas Michelsen, businessperson and politician (born 1821)
- 13 November – Sivert Christensen Strøm, jurist and politician (born 1819)

=== Full date unknown ===
- Jon Eilevsson Steintjønndalen, Hardanger fiddle maker (born 1845)
- Knut Eilevsson Steintjønndalen, Hardanger fiddle maker (born 1850)
- Sofie Parelius, actress (born 1823)
