= 2000 in Norway =

- Centuries: 18th; 19th; 20th; 21st
- Decades: 1980s; 1990s; 2000s; 2010s; 2020s
- See also: List of years in Norway

The following lists events that happened during 2000 in Norway.

== Incumbents ==
- Monarch – Harald V.
- Prime Minister – Kjell Magne Bondevik (Christian Democratic Party) until 17 March, Jens Stoltenberg (Labour Party)

== Events ==
=== January ===
- 19 January – Five people die when a bus is taken by an avalanche in Lyngen Municipality.

=== March ===
- 3 March – Kjell Magne Bondevik resigns after losing a confidence vote.
- 11 March – Three people die when a community center in Målselv Municipality collapsed due to heavy snowfall.
- 17 March – Stoltenberg's First Cabinet was appointed.

=== April ===
- 5 April – Two freight trains collide at Lillestrøm Station. 2,000 people were evacuated because of the danger of a gas explosion.
- 14 April -- Å Energi (formally Agder Energi) is founded.

=== May ===
- 19 May – The Baneheia murders.

=== June ===
- 23 June – The Frøya Tunnel is opened.
- June – Project Deep Spill: the first intentional deepwater oil and gas spill, which was done in order to study how crude oil behaved at depth.

=== December ===
- 1 December – King Harald V of Norway informs the Norwegian government about the engagement between Crown Prince Haakon and Mette-Marit Tjessem Høiby.
- 4 December – The state-owned telecommunications company Telenor is partially privatised and listed on the Oslo Stock Exchange and NASDAQ.

== Popular culture ==
=== Sports ===
- 19 to 26 February – The Biathlon World Championships 2000 were held in Holmenkollen.

=== Music ===
- Norway in the Eurovision Song Contest 2000

=== Literature ===
- Jon Fosse – Morning and Evening (Morgon og kveld) (novella).

== Births ==
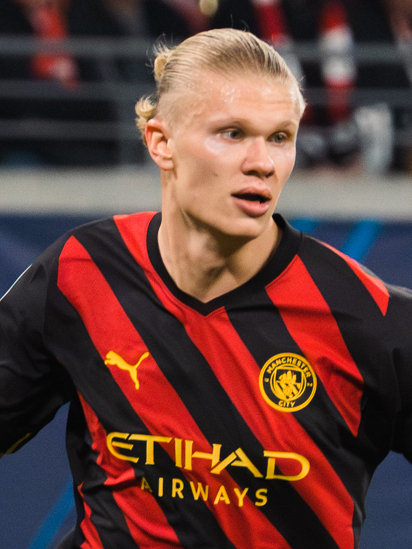
Erling Haaland

- 10 January – Erik Botheim, footballer
- 6 February – Jørgen Strand Larsen, footballer
- 18 February – Anders Waagan, footballer
- 27 February – Erik Sandberg, footballer
- 29 February – Hugo Vetlesen, footballer
- 7 April – André Klippenberg Grindheim, swimmer.
- 19 April – Lucas Pinheiro Braathen, alpine skier.
- 7 May – Markus Karlsbakk, footballer
- 9 May – Ragne Wiklund, speed skater and orienteer.
- 21 July
  - Erling Haaland, English-born Norwegian footballer.
  - Jens Lurås Oftebro, Nordic combined skier.
- 9 August – Julia Eikeland, politician.
- 18 August – Ida Marie Hagen, Nordic combined skier.
- 19 September – Jakob Ingebrigtsen, middle- and long-distance runner.
- 22 November – Simen Velle, politician.

== Notable deaths ==
=== January – March ===
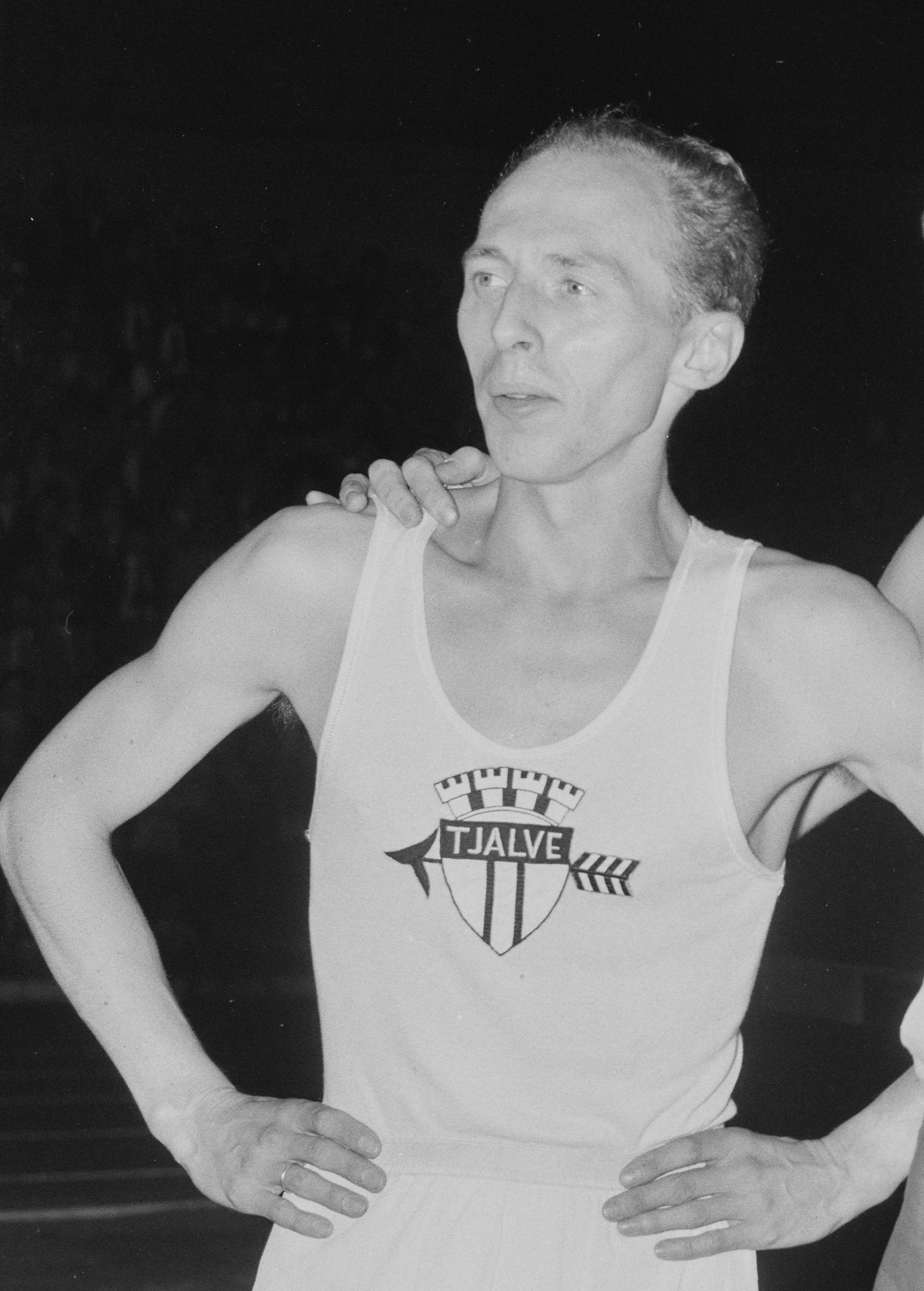
Audun Boysen

- 9 January – Olaug Hay, politician (b.1902)
- 11 January – Edvard Magnus Edvardsen, politician (b.1910).
- 21 January – Kristian Asdahl, politician (b.1920)
- 27 January – Asle Enger, priest (born 1906).
- 30 January – Gerd Kjølaas, ballet dancer and choreographer (born 1909).
- 3 February – Aslaug Fredriksen, politician (b.1918)
- 16 February – Karsten Solheim, golf club designer and businessman in America (b.1911)
- 2 March – Audun Boysen, middle-distance runner and Olympic bronze medallist (b.1928)
- 3 March – Egil Werner Erichsen, politician (b.1901)
- 6 March – Ole Jacob Hansen, jazz drummer (b.1940).
- 18 March – Randi Hultin, jazz critic and impresario (b.1926).

=== April – June ===
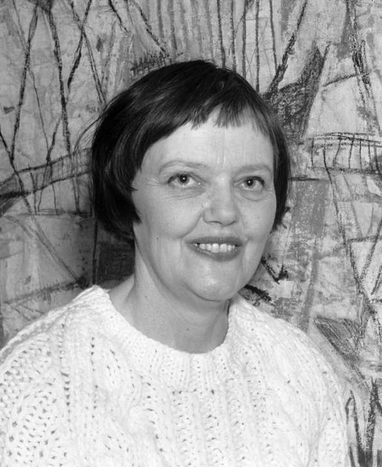
Synnøve Anker Aurdal, textile artist

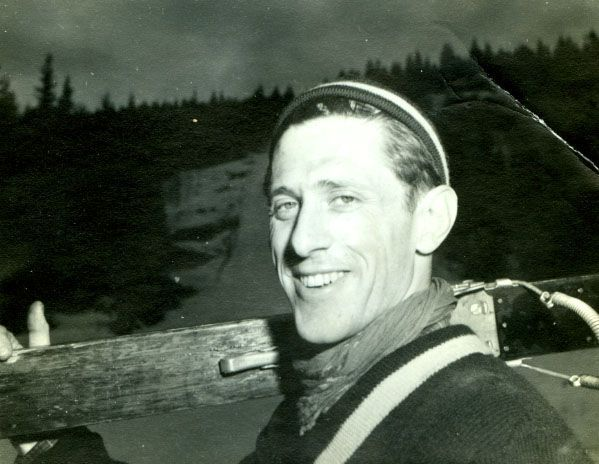
Petter Hugsted, Olympic gold medalist in 1948

- 2 April – Greta Gynt, singer, dancer and actress (b.1916)
- 2 April – Synnøve Anker Aurdal, textile artist (born 1908).
- 11 April – Olav Økern, cross country skier and Olympic bronze medallist (b.1911)
- 22 April – Arnt Eliassen, meteorologist (b.1915)
- 28 April – Anders Skauge, politician (b.1912)
- 19 May – Petter Hugsted, ski jumper and Olympic gold medallist (b.1921)
- 11 June – Aud Alvær, politician (b.1921)
- 17 June – Jæger Dokk, insurance executive (born 1921).
- 22 June – Svein Finnerud, jazz pianist (b.1945).
- 26 June – Arne Thomas Olsen, actor, stage producer and theatre director (b.1909)
- 27 June – Dagmar Maalstad, politician (b.1902)

=== July – September ===
- 2 September – Johannes Sandven, educator (born 1909).
- 4 September – Jack Fjeldstad, actor (born 1915).
- 10 September – Haldis Havrøy, politician (b.1925)

=== October – December ===
- 17 October – Joachim «Jokke» Nielsen (36), rock musician and poet.
- 26 October – Birgit Wessel, textile designer (born 1911).
- 4 November – Anneliese Dørum, politician (b.1939)
- 18 November – Torstein Tynning, politician (b.1932)
- 28 November – Margith Johanne Munkebye, politician (b.1911)
- 30 December – Tom Blohm, footballer (born 1920).

=== Full date unknown ===
- Bjarte Birkeland, literary researcher (b.1920)
- Finn-Egil Eckblad, mycologist and professor (b.1923)
- Jostein Goksøyr, microbiologist (b.1922)
- Kjell Holler, politician and Minister (b.1925)
- Jul Låg, soil researcher (b.1915)
- Arne B. Mollén, sports official (b.1913)
- Odd Narud, businessperson (b.1919)
- Christian Norberg-Schulz, architect, architectural historian and theorist (b.1926)
