= Syvde =

Syvde may refer to:

- Syvde, Møre og Romsdal, a village within Vanylven Municipality in Møre og Romsdal county, Norway
- Syvde Municipality, a former municipality in Møre og Romsdal county, Norway
- Syvde Fjord or Syvdefjorden, a fjord within Vanylven Municipality in Møre og Romsdal county, Norway
- Syvde Church, a church in Vanylven Municipality in Møre og Romsdal county, Norway
