= Syvde Municipality =

Former municipality in Møre og Romsdal, Norway

Syvde Municipality Syvde herred
- Former municipality
- Søvde herred (historic name)
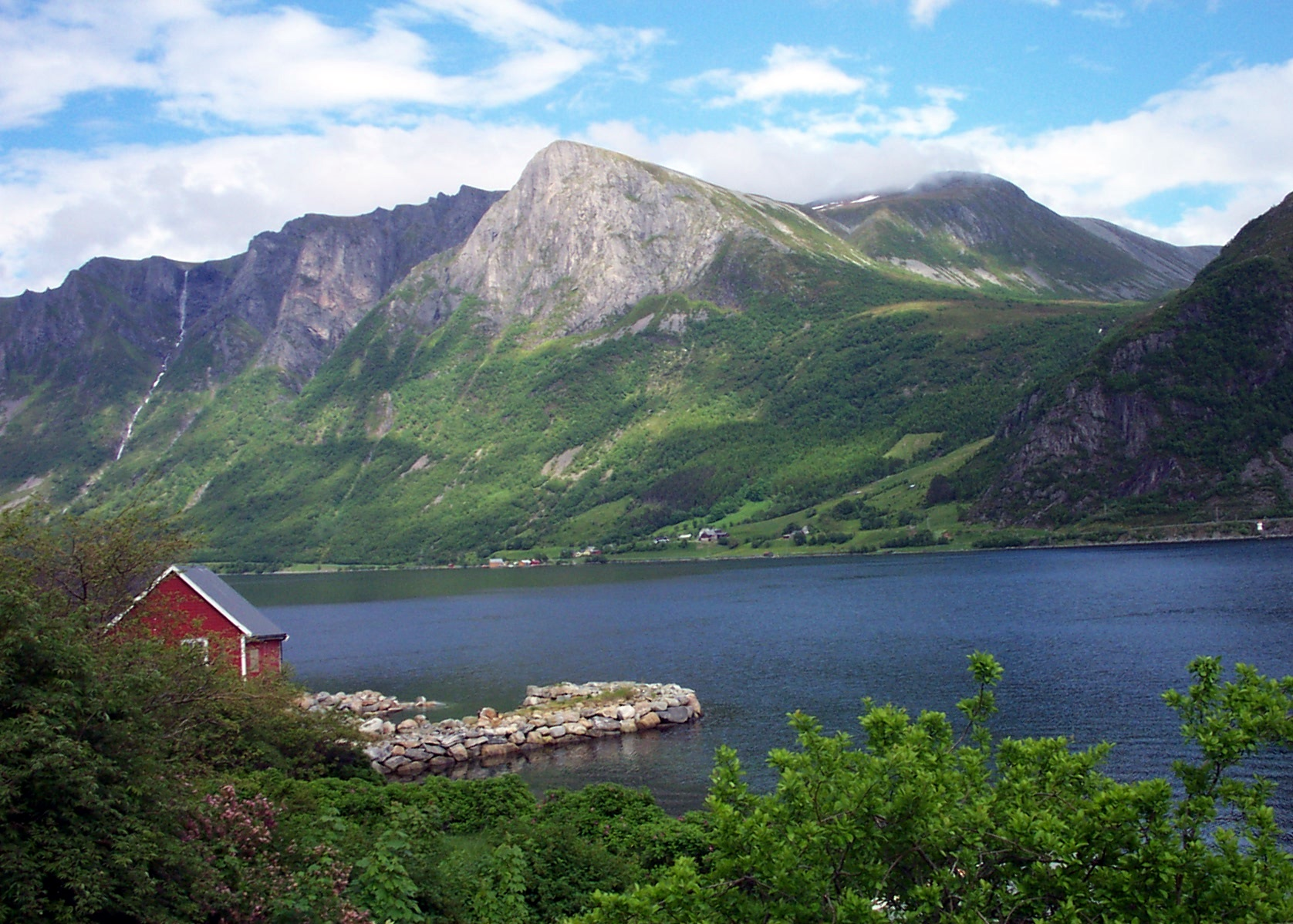
- View from Eidså across the Syvdsfjorden in the area of the old Syvde municipality

- Møre og Romsdal within Norway

- Syvde within Møre og Romsdal
- Coordinates: 62°05′16″N 05°44′15″E
- Country: Norway
- County: Møre og Romsdal
- District: Sunnmøre
- Established: 1 Feb 1918
  - Preceded by: Vanylven Municipality
- Disestablished: 1 Jan 1964
  - Succeeded by: Vanylven Municipality
- Administrative centre: Myklebost

Government
  - Mayor (1959–1963): Botolv Holsvik

Area (upon dissolution)
  - Total: 127.3 km^{2} (49.2 sq mi)
  - Rank: #468 in Norway
- Highest elevation: 1,142.95 m (3,749.8 ft)

Population (1963)
  - Total: 1,482
  - Rank: #538 in Norway
  - Density: 11.6/km^{2} (30/sq mi)
  - Change (10 years): ▲ +2.5%
- Demonym: Syvding

Official language
  - Norwegian form: Nynorsk
- Time zone: UTC+01:00 (CET)
  - Summer (DST): UTC+02:00 (CEST)
- ISO 3166 code: NO-1512

Syvde is a former municipality in Møre og Romsdal county, Norway. The 127-square-kilometre (49 sq mi) municipality existed from 1918 until its dissolution in 1964. The area is now part of Vanylven Municipality in the traditional district of Sunnmøre. The administrative centre was the village of Myklebost, at the end of the Syvdsfjorden. Syvde Church was the municipal church.

Prior to its dissolution in 1964, the 127.3-square-kilometre (49.2 sq mi) municipality was the 468th largest by area out of the 689 municipalities in Norway. Syvde Municipality was the 538th most populous municipality in Norway with a population of about 1,482. The municipality's population density was 11.6 inhabitants per square kilometre (30/sq mi) and its population had increased by 2.5% over the previous 10-year period.

== General information ==
The municipality of Søvde (later spelled Syvde) was established on 1 February 1918 when the old Vanylven Municipality was split into two municipalities: Vanyvlen Municipality (population: 1,848) in the west and the new Søvde Municipality (population: 1,260) in the east.

During the 1960s, there were many municipal mergers across Norway due to the work of the Schei Committee. On 1 January 1964, Syvde Municipality was dissolved and the following areas were merged to form a new, larger Vanylven Municipality:

- all of Syvde Municipality (population: 1,458)
- the portion of Rovde Municipality that was located south of the Rovdefjorden (population: 436)
- all of Vanylven Municipality (population: 2,003)

=== Name ===
The municipality is named after the local fjord, Syvdsfjorden (Old Norse: Sybðir). The name is likely derived from the word svífa which means "to swerve" or "to drift", probably referring to the crooked or bent shape of the fjord. Historically, the name was spelled Søvde.

=== Churches ===
The Church of Norway had one parish (sokn) within Syvde Municipality. At the time of the municipal dissolution, it was part of the Vanylven prestegjeld and the Søre Sunnmøre prosti (deanery) in the Diocese of Bjørgvin.

Churches in Syvde Municipality
Parish (sokn)	Church name	Location of the church	Year built
Syvde	Syvde Church	Syvde	1837

== Geography ==
The municipality included the areas surrounding the Syvdsfjorden. The highest point in the municipality was the 1,142.95-metre (3,749.8 ft) tall mountain Storeblæja. Rovde Municipality was located to the northeast, Dalsfjord Municipality was located to the east and south, Vanylven Municipality was located to the west, and Sande Municipality was located to the northwest.

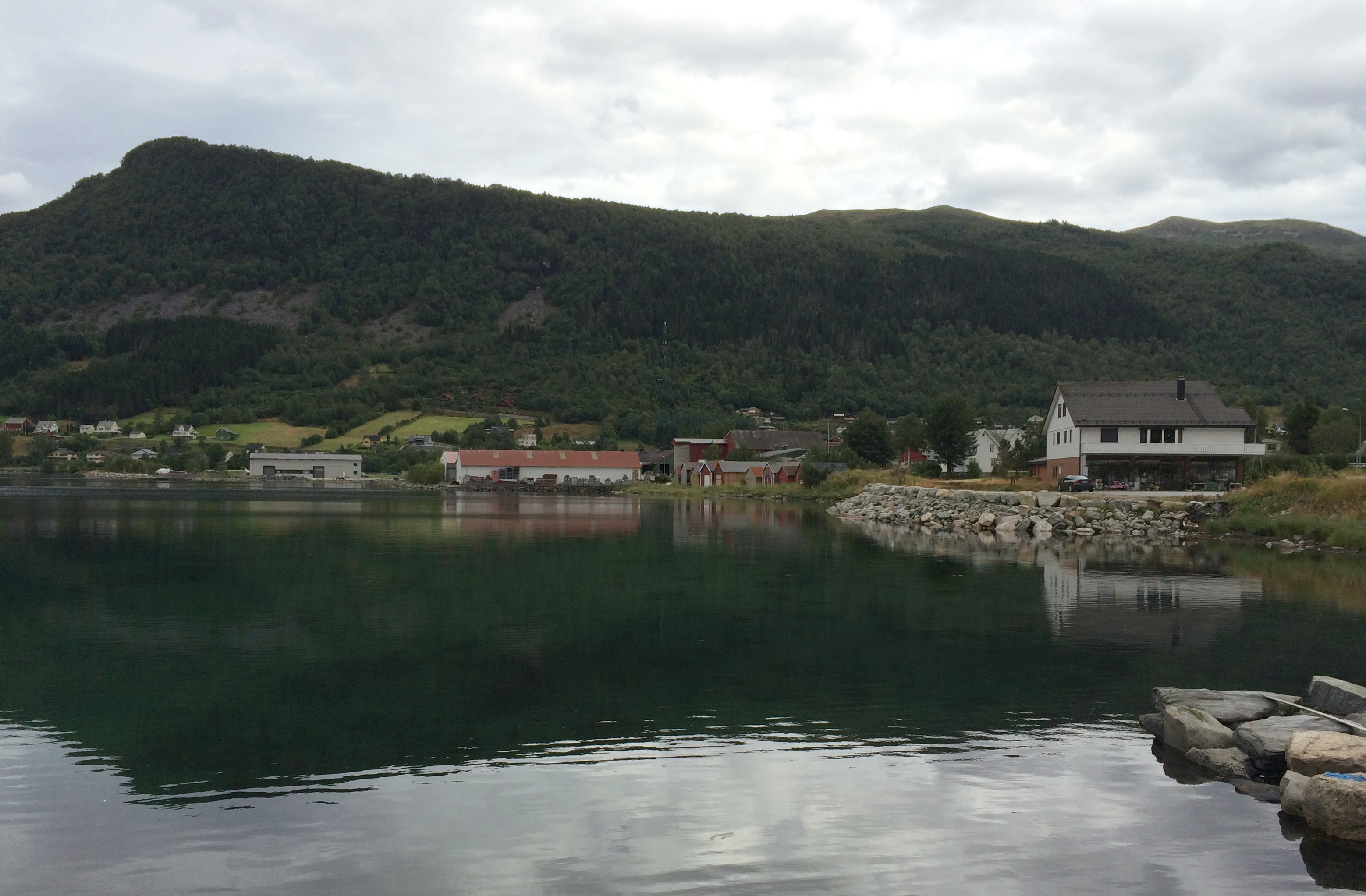
View of the Syvde area

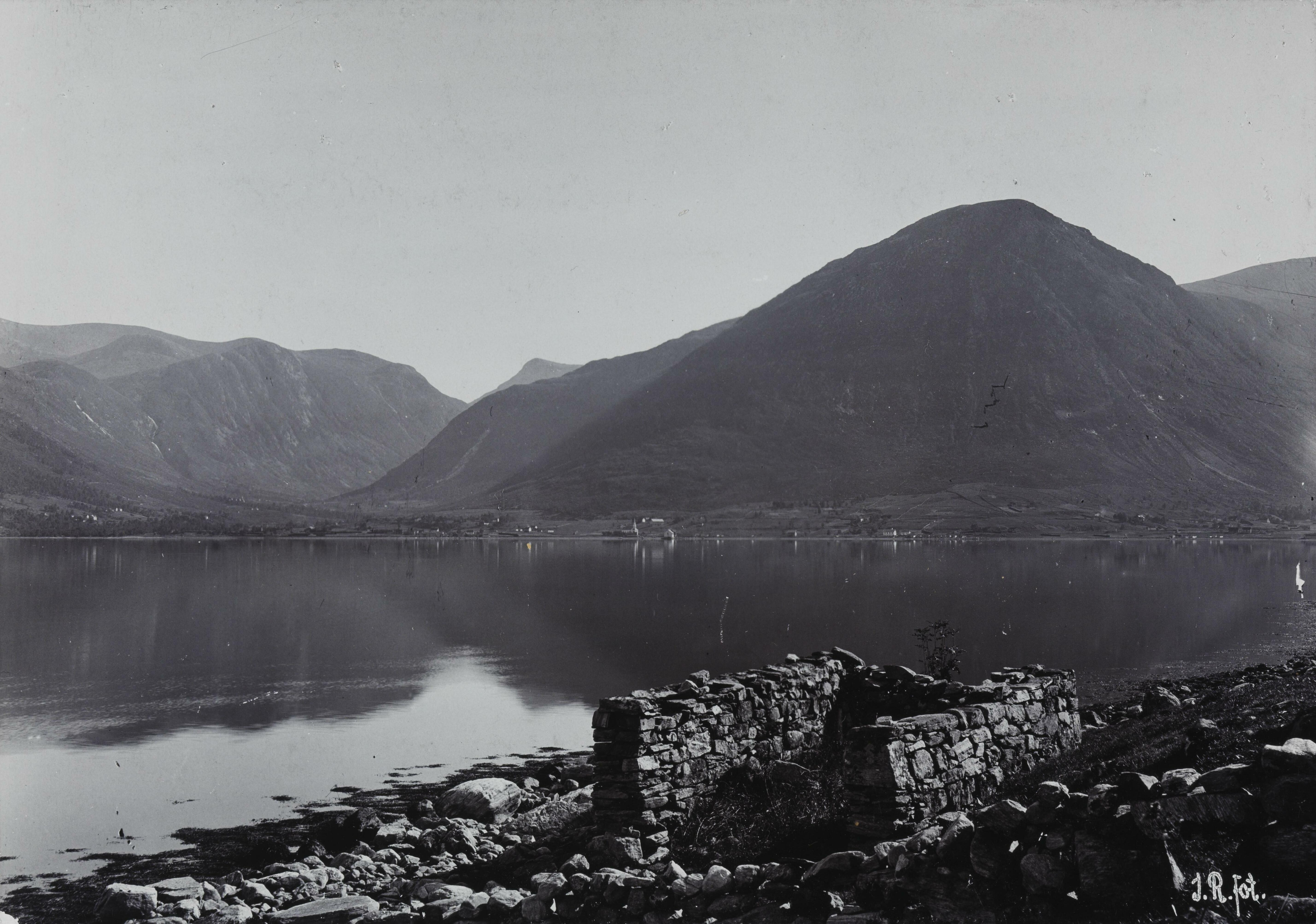
Syvde seen from Ytre Løset

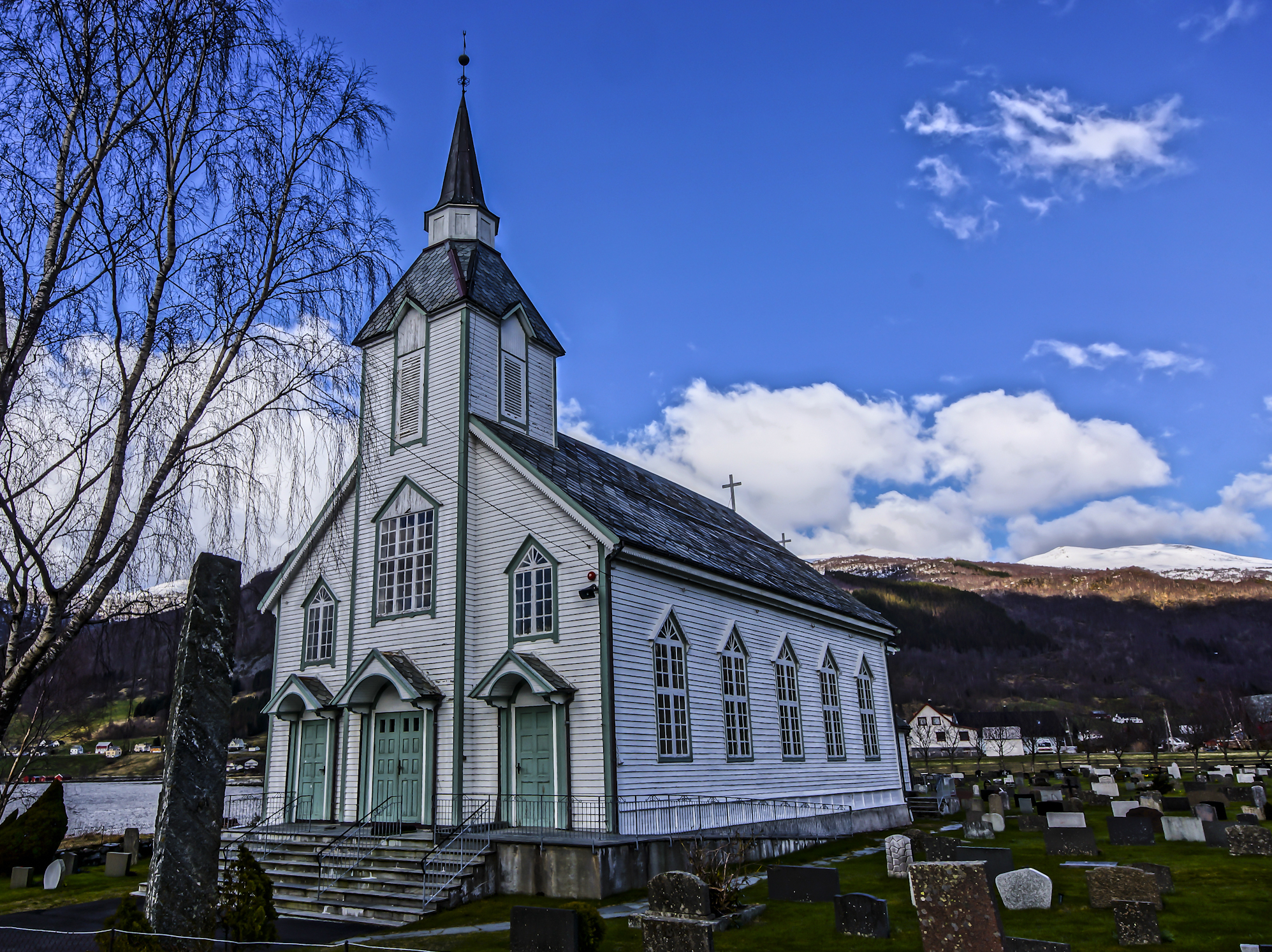
Syvde Church

== Government ==
Syvde Municipality was responsible for primary education (through 10th grade), outpatient health services, senior citizen services, welfare and other social services, zoning, economic development, and municipal roads and utilities. The municipality was governed by a municipal council of directly elected representatives. The mayor was indirectly elected by a vote of the municipal council. The municipality was under the jurisdiction of the Frostating Court of Appeal.

=== Municipal council ===
The municipal council (Heradsstyre) of Syvde Municipality was made up of 17 representatives that were elected to four year terms. The tables below show the historical composition of the council by political party.

Syvde heradsstyre 1959–1963
Party name (in Nynorsk)	Number of representatives
Local List(s) (Lokale lister)	17
Total number of members:	17
Note: On 1 January 1964, Syvde Municipality became part of Vanylven Municipality.

Syvde heradsstyre 1955–1959
Party name (in Nynorsk)	Number of representatives
Local List(s) (Lokale lister)	17
Total number of members:	17

Syvde heradsstyre 1951–1955
Party name (in Nynorsk)	Number of representatives
Local List(s) (Lokale lister)	16
Total number of members:	16

Syvde herredsstyre 1947–1951
Party name (in Norwegian)	Number of representatives
Farmers' Party (Bondepartiet)	6
Local List(s) (Lokale lister)	10
Total number of members:	16

Syvde heradsstyre 1945–1947
Party name (in Nynorsk)	Number of representatives
Local List(s) (Lokale lister)	16
Total number of members:	16

Syvde heradsstyre 1937–1941*
Party name (in Nynorsk)	Number of representatives
Labour Party (Arbeidarpartiet)	3
Local List(s) (Lokale lister)	13
Total number of members:	16
Note: Due to the German occupation of Norway during World War II, no elections were held for new municipal councils until after the war ended in 1945.

=== Mayors ===
The mayor (Nynorsk: ordførar) of Syvde Municipality was the political leader of the municipality and the chairperson of the municipal council. The following people have held this position:

- 1918–1928: Kristian Sandnes (V/Bp)
- 1928–1937: Ola Larsen Vik
- 1937–1944: Peter Vik
- 1945–1947: Asbjørn Øye (V)
- 1947–1951: Kristoffer Sørdal
- 1951–1959: Simon Eikrem (Bp)
- 1959–1963: Botolv Holsvik

== See also ==
- List of former municipalities of Norway
