= Justice Roll =

Justice Roll may refer to:

- Curtis Roll (1884-1970), justice of the Supreme Court of Indiana from 1931 to 1943
- Jacob Roll (born 1783) (1783–1870), chief justice of Trondhjem Diocesan Court in Norway from 1828 to 1855

== See also ==
- Atle Roll-Matthiesen (1906–?), justice of the Supreme Court of Norway in 1958
