= Magnus Jensen =

Magnus Jensen may refer to:

- Magnus Jensen (footballer) (born 1996), Danish football player
- Magnus Jensen (historian) (1992–1990), Norwegian resistance leader
- Magnus Jensen (Queensland politician) (1857–1915), Australian politician
