= Operation Catechism =

British air raid of World War II

- Part of World War II
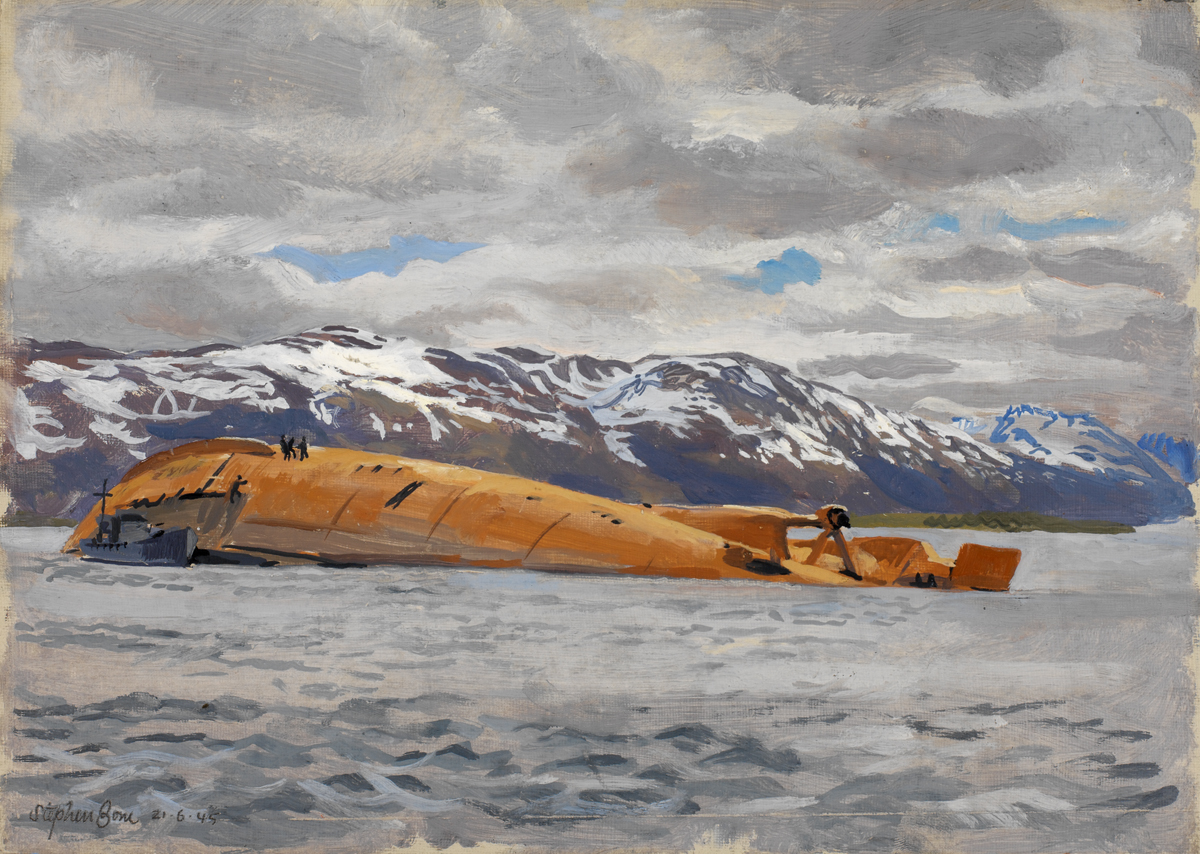
- 'The Wreck of the Tirpitz'
Date	12 November 1944
Location	Near Tromsø, Norway 69°38′49″N 18°48′26″E
Result	British victory

Belligerents
United Kingdom	Germany

Commanders and leaders
James Tait	Robert Weber †

Strength
29 bombers	Battleship Tirpitz; 2 flak ships; Anti-aircraft guns

Casualties and losses
1 aircraft damaged	940–1,204 killed; Tirpitz destroyed

Operation Catechism was the British air raid of World War II that destroyed the German battleship Tirpitz. It was conducted on 12 November 1944 by 29 heavy bombers from the Royal Air Force, which attacked the battleship at its anchorage near the Norwegian city of Tromsø. The ship capsized after being hit by at least two bombs and damaged by the explosions of others, killing between 940 and 1,204 members of the crew; the British suffered no casualties.

The attack ended a long-running series of air and naval operations against Tirpitz that sought to eliminate the threat she posed to Allied shipping. The battleship had been moved to the Tromsø area in October 1944 after being crippled on 15 September during Operation Paravane. This attack had been carried out by the RAF's elite Nos. 9 and 617 Squadrons, who unsuccessfully attempted to strike Tirpitz again at Tromsø on 29 October during Operation Obviate.

Operation Catechism re-used the plans for Operation Obviate, and was conducted by the same squadrons. The aircraft departed from bases in northern Scotland and, due to clear weather conditions, the Commonwealth airmen were able to accurately target and bomb the battleship. The bombers were unmolested by a unit of German fighter aircraft that failed to take off from nearby Tromsø in time. One bomber was significantly damaged by anti-aircraft artillery.

Tirpitz capsized within minutes of being hit. Rescuers picked up hundreds of her crew from the water, but few of those trapped within the hull were saved. Several German military personnel were convicted of dereliction of duty following the attack. The battleship's destruction was celebrated in Allied countries and Norway, and is commemorated by several memorials and displays in museums.

== Background ==
From early 1942, Tirpitz posed a significant threat to Allied convoys transporting supplies through the Norwegian Sea to the Soviet Union. Stationed in fjords on the Norwegian coast, the battleship was capable of overwhelming the close-escort forces assigned to the Arctic convoys or breaking out into the North Atlantic. To counter this threat, the Allies needed to keep a powerful force of warships with the British Home Fleet, and capital ships accompanied most convoys part of the way to the Soviet Union.

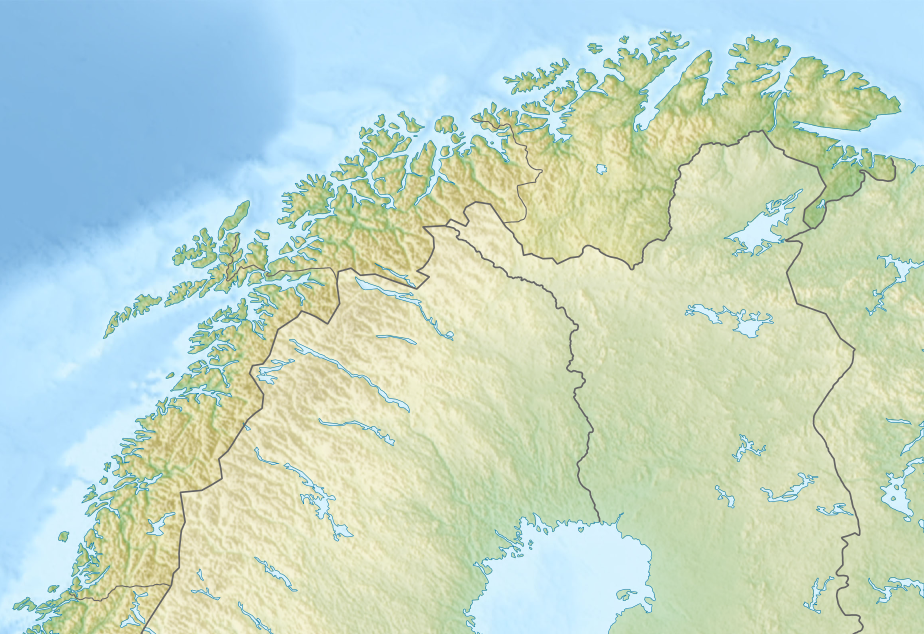
Northern Norway and nearby areas of Sweden, Finland and the Soviet Union

Tirpitz was repeatedly attacked at her anchorages in Norway by Allied forces over several years. Royal Air Force (RAF) heavy bombers made four unsuccessful raids on the battleship between January and April 1942 while she was stationed at Fættenfjord. From March 1943, Tirpitz was based at Kaafjord in the far north of Norway. During Operation Source on 22 September, she was severely damaged by explosives placed on her hull by Royal Navy personnel who had used midget submarines to penetrate Kaafjord. On 3 April 1944, aircraft flying from Royal Navy aircraft carriers attacked Tirpitz during Operation Tungsten and inflicted further damage. A series of subsequent aircraft carrier attacks were unsuccessful, including Operation Mascot on 17 July and Operation Goodwood which was conducted between 22 and 29 August 1944.

After the failure of Operation Goodwood, it was decided that further carrier attacks against Tirpitz would be fruitless due to the inadequacies of the Royal Navy's aircraft and their armament. Accordingly, responsibility for sinking Tirpitz was transferred to the RAF's Bomber Command. On 15 September 1944, the elite Nos. 9 and 617 Squadrons attacked the battleship at Kaafjord in what was designated Operation Paravane. This operation employed Avro Lancaster heavy bombers armed with Tallboy heavy bombs and "Johnnie Walker" mines. The Tallboy bomb weighed 12,000 pounds (5,400 kg) and had been developed to destroy heavily armoured targets. When dropped from a high altitude, the bomb could penetrate a battleship's deck armour before exploding within the vessel. Tirpitz was struck by a single Tallboy during the attack that caused extensive damage to her bow and rendered her unfit for combat.

As Tirpitz could not be repaired and Soviet forces were advancing towards Kaafjord, Grand Admiral Karl Dönitz, the commander of the Kriegsmarine (the German Navy), ordered that she be transferred to near the northern Norwegian city of Tromsø and used as an immobile battery to defend the area from attack. Dönitz hoped that this would also convince the Allies that Tirpitz continued to pose a threat. An anchorage was selected just off the coast of the island of Håkøya where it was believed the water was shallow enough to prevent the battleship from sinking if another attack was successful. Tirpitz arrived there on 16 October. The depth of water at the mooring was found to be greater than anticipated, leaving the battleship vulnerable to capsizing. Because of the space needed by Tirpitz's torpedo nets, it was not possible to move her closer to shore.

RAF and Royal Navy reconnaissance aircraft located Tirpitz at Tromsø on 18 October. As the Allied intelligence services had not been able to confirm that the battleship had been crippled, it was considered necessary to conduct further air raids against her. Nos. 9 and 617 Squadrons attacked Tirpitz on 29 October during Operation Obviate. As the Tromsø area was within range of RAF bases in northern Scotland if the Lancasters were modified, this attack was somewhat simpler to conduct than Operation Paravane. To extend their range, the Lancasters were fitted with extra fuel tanks and more powerful engines and their forward and mid-upper gun turrets and pilot's armour plate were removed. The reduction in armament left the Lancasters very vulnerable to German fighter aircraft, and they would have to fly without escort as no British fighters had the range needed to reach Tromsø.

During Operation Obviate, the bombers flew north over the Norwegian Sea, and met up over Torneträsk lake in Northern Sweden. This violated Sweden's neutrality, but allowed the bombers to approach Tromsø from the south-east. The Allies believed the Germans would not expect an attack from this direction. Despite clear weather for most of the flight, Tirpitz was covered by cloud shortly before the Lancasters reached the point where they were to release their Tallboy bombs. The cloud made it impossible to accurately target the battleship, and the 33 aircraft which bombed achieved no hits. Tirpitz was slightly damaged by a near miss. One of the Lancasters made a forced landing in Sweden after being damaged by anti-aircraft gunfire, and the remainder returned to base.

== Preparations ==
=== British ===
Bomber Command remained determined to sink Tirpitz as soon as possible and preparations for another attack began shortly after Operation Obviate. A report issued by the Royal Navy's Naval Intelligence Division on 3 November judged that it remained necessary to attack Tirpitz in northern Norway. The report argued that the battleship could potentially be repaired and made fully operational if she was left unmolested and able to reach a major port. As it would be difficult to target the battleship during the period of near perpetual darkness in the northern winter, further attacks had to be made within the 23 days before this commenced. No. 5 Group RAF directed on 3 November that the next attack on Tirpitz was to take place on 5 November, and would re-use the plans developed for Operation Obviate. The raid was designated Operation Catechism.

Two de Havilland Mosquito meteorological aircraft were stationed at RAF Sumburgh from 4 November, from where they conducted daily sorties to monitor weather conditions in the Tromsø area. On the same day, twenty No. 9 Squadron and nineteen No. 617 Squadron Lancasters were dispatched to airfields in northern Scotland in preparation for the operation. A gale warning was issued that night and the raid was cancelled as a result on the morning of 5 November. Both squadrons returned to their home bases during the day. The two squadrons deployed again to Scotland on 7 November, but soon returned to their bases when the attack was cancelled.

On 10 November, the Lancaster crews were briefed for another attack on Tirpitz. Both squadrons moved to northern Scotland on 11 November when meteorological reports indicated that there would be clear weather over Tromsø for up to two days. The aircraft were split between RAF Kinloss, RAF Lossiemouth and RAF Milltown.

=== German ===
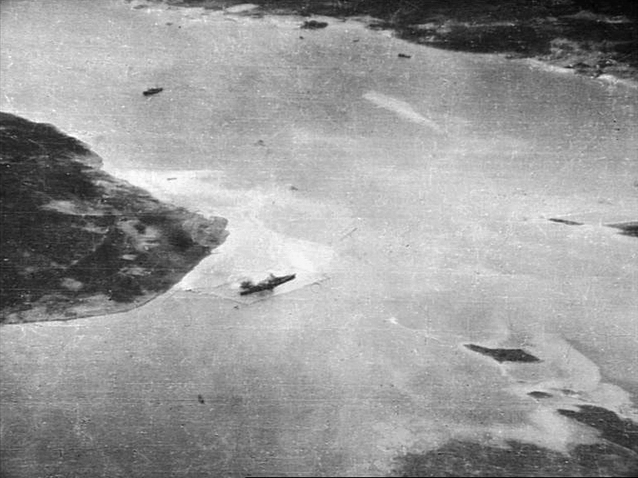
Tirpitz at her mooring off the island of Håkøya in northern Norway in November 1944

Tirpitz's defences were improved after Operation Obviate. Additional anti-aircraft guns were emplaced in the Tromsø area and torpedo nets were laid around the battleship. These augmented the protection offered by the anti-aircraft ships Nymphe and Thetis and several anti-aircraft batteries on the shore. Dredging operations to reduce the water level below the battleship's hull began on 1 November. By 12 November these were half complete. The smoke generators that had previously protected Tirpitz at Kaafjord were still being installed at the time of Operation Catechism and were not yet operational. In their place, seven fishing boats fitted with smoke generators were positioned near the battleship; these were not capable of generating a smokescreen that could completely cover Tirpitz.

The battleship's crew continued regular training exercises, and remained concerned about further air attacks. On 4 November Tirpitz's commanding officer Captain Wolf Junge departed. He was replaced by the executive officer, Captain Robert Weber. Weber believed that within three weeks the days would be short enough to prevent further air attacks. On 12 November around 1,700 men were on board Tirpitz.

A force of 38 fighters was transferred to Bardufoss after Operation Obviate to bolster the Tromsø region's air defences. These aircraft formed part of Jagdgeschwader 5 (JG 5), and were under the temporary command of Major Heinrich Ehrler. The unit had been evacuated from Kirkenes in the far northeastern region of Norway as Soviet forces advanced towards the town, and was disorganised at the time of Operation Catechism. Most of the pilots at Bardufoss were inexperienced and ill-trained, and the unit had not been properly briefed on Tirpitz's presence in the area. Ehrler arrived at Bardufoss on 9 November en route to Alta, and decided to remain there until the morning of 12 November to oversee an emergency training programme for the fighter pilots.

== Attack ==
=== Departure ===
The decision to launch Operation Catechism was made in the early hours of 12 November. A weather forecast issued on the afternoon of 11 November predicted that clouds might be encountered over northern Norway. One of the Mosquito meteorological aircraft flew over the area that evening, and its crew reported patches of cloud when they returned to Scotland shortly after midnight on the night of 11–12 November. The commander of No. 5 Group, Air Commodore Ralph Cochrane, decided to attempt another attack in the hope that the bombers would encounter clear weather over Tromsø. The plan for this operation remained the same as that used in Operation Obviate, with the attack force to use identical routes.

A total of 32 Lancasters were dispatched. No. 617 Squadron contributed eighteen bombers, and No. 9 Squadron thirteen. As with Operations Paravane and Obviate, they were joined by a Lancaster fitted out as a film aircraft from No. 463 Squadron RAAF. The role of this aircraft was to collect material for use in propaganda films. Seven No. 9 Squadron Lancasters, including that of its commanding officer Wing Commander James Bazin, were unable to participate, as they could not be cleared in time of snow and ice that had formed on them overnight. The No. 617 Squadron aircraft took off between 2:59 and 3:25 am BST, and the No. 9 Squadron aircraft between 3:00 and 3:35 am BST. The aircraft flown by No. 9 Squadron's deputy commander, Squadron Leader Bill Williams, was among those able to take off and he assumed command of the unit.

The Lancasters flew individually over the Norwegian Sea. As had been the case during Operation Obviate, they crossed the Norwegian coast between the towns of Mosjøen and Namsos where a gap in German radar coverage had been located. Several of the bombers flew too far to the north, and came within range of German radar stations. The Lancasters rendezvoused over Torneträsk lake. After making two orbits, No. 617 Squadron's commanding officer, Wing Commander "Willie" Tait, fired a flare gun from his aircraft to signal the force to proceed to Tromsø. Two No. 9 Squadron Lancasters failed to reach Torneträsk lake in time and returned to base without attacking.

=== Approach ===
The attack force proceeded north-west towards Tromsø, and climbed to 14,000 feet (4,300 m) to clear the mountains along the border of Sweden and Norway. They were guided by radio homing signals transmitted by a Norwegian Milorg agent stationed near the border between the two countries. By the time they reached the Tromsø area, both of the squadrons had formed up into loose formations. No. 617 Squadron led the attack, followed by No. 9 Squadron. The Lancasters were grouped into "gaggles" of four to six aircraft that flew at altitudes of between 14,000 feet (4,300 m) and 15,000 feet (4,600 m). The No. 463 Squadron film aircraft approached Tromsø at 6,000 feet (1,800 m), and dropped to 2,000 feet (610 m) to evade anti-aircraft fire at the start of the attack.

The German forces in the Tromsø area failed to adequately respond to multiple warnings of the approaching British bombers. Between 7:39 am and 8:50 am BST several observation posts in the area reported sighting Lancasters. As the first aircraft to be spotted were flying east, it was thought that they might be headed to the Soviet Union. Tirpitz was not notified of the reports until 8:15 am BST and few reports were passed on to the JG 5 detachment at Bardufoss. Tirpitz's air raid siren was sounded at 8:51 am, and Weber informed the ship's crew seven minutes later that an attack was possible.

At around 9:15 am BST, Tirpitz contacted Bardufoss to request that fighters be dispatched to provide air cover. This was too late for any of the fighters to reach Tromsø before the bombers arrived. The local Luftwaffe command ordered the fighters to be scrambled at 9:18 am. Due to various delays, the aircraft did not begin taking off from Bardufoss until approximately 9:32 am. Ehrler took off first, but the others were delayed from doing so for several minutes while a Ju-52 transport aircraft landed on the runway. Ehrler proceeded to the Tromsø area by himself, but was unable to locate the British bombers before they attacked. It is not clear where the other fighters were sent. One post-attack report stated they were sent to the border with Sweden, another that they proceeded to Kaafjord and two pilots claimed to have reached Tromsø after Tirpitz was destroyed.

Weather conditions over Tromsø continued to be clear as the attack force arrived in the area. Tait spotted Tirpitz from 20 miles (32 km) away, and later recalled that she was "lying squat and black among her torpedo nets like a spider in her web, silhouetted against the glittering blue and green waters of the fjord".

=== Destruction of Tirpitz ===
A film showing Tirpitz under attack during Operations Paravane and Catechism

Tirpitz fired the first shots of the battle at 9:38 am BST when she opened fire on the bombers with her 15-inch (380 mm) calibre main guns from a range of 13.5 miles (22 km). Other anti-aircraft guns also fired on the Lancasters as they approached, but did not disrupt them. No smokescreen was present as they flew north-west towards their bombing positions.

The attack commenced at 9:41 am BST. Tait's aircraft was the first to drop its Tallboy, which hit Tirpitz. No. 617 Squadron completed its attack at 9:44 am BST with all aircraft bombing. No. 9 Squadron aircraft began dropping their Tallboys at 9:45 am BST. By this time the battleship was on fire and covered in smoke. The last bomb was released at 9:49 am BST.

Tirpitz was rapidly sunk. She was struck by two Tallboys that penetrated her armoured deck. One hit to the port of "Bruno" turret in the forward section of the ship but did not explode. The other, which was dropped by Tait's aircraft, struck the port side amidships near the tracks for the aircraft catapult, and exploded over the port boiler room. This caused severe damage that resulted in extensive flooding, fires throughout the ship and a list of 15 to 20 degrees to port. Several bombs detonated in the water near Tirpitz, causing further damage to her hull and additional flooding. These explosions also created large craters below the ship, and blew away much of the gravel that had been dumped beneath her. Another Tallboy probably hit Tirpitz. It either ricocheted off the side of the ship, or penetrated the armoured deck near "Caesar" turret in the stern of the ship and started a fire near a powder or shell magazine. Almost all the hits and near misses were on the port side of Tirpitz, which destabilised her and led the list to rapidly increase.. It was these near misses that "really finished her".

Many sailors manning Tirpitz's anti-aircraft guns were killed or wounded by the bombs, resulting in a significant reduction in the volume of fire directed at the Lancasters.

After the first bomb struck his ship, Weber ordered the crew to evacuate the armoured citadel and attempt to counter the flooding. Despite the list, Weber expected that Tirpitz would not sink as the water beneath her hull was too shallow. Counter flooding proved impossible as the controls for the necessary systems had been abandoned, and the volume of water that was entering the ship was well beyond their ability to counteract had they been operational. Weber ordered that the lower decks be evacuated at 9:45 am, by which time the list had reached between 30 and 40 degrees. At 9:50 am the magazine for "Caesar" turret exploded, causing extensive damage. Tirpitz's list rapidly increased, and she was soon lying on her side. Weber then gave the order to abandon ship. The battleship continued to heel over, and capsized at 9:52 am. Almost 1,000 crew had either been killed by this time, or were trapped inside the hull.

The crews of several Lancasters observed Tirpitz capsize. The No. 463 Squadron film aircraft made a final pass over the battleship at an altitude of just 50 feet (15 m) to capture footage of the event. Just after 11:00 am BST a photo reconnaissance Mosquito overflew the Tromsø region, and photographed the wreck. The Secret Intelligence Service agent Egil Lindberg also sent radio reports from Tromsø confirming that Tirpitz had been sunk.

== Aftermath ==
=== Rescue efforts ===
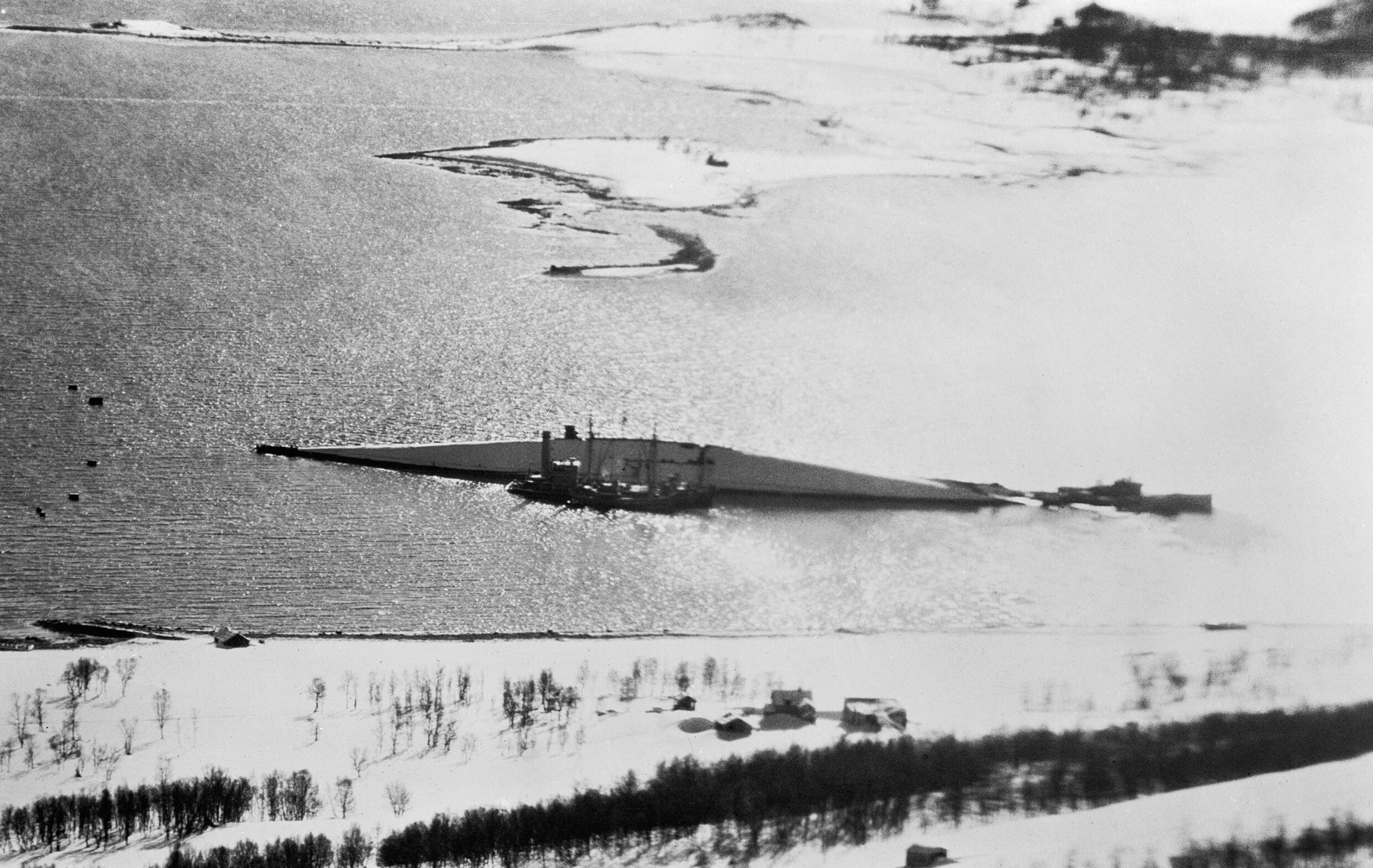
The capsized Tirpitz in March 1945

German forces in the Tromsø area endeavoured to rescue the surviving members of Tirpitz's crew. Within two hours, 596 had swum to shore or been rescued from the water. Others were trapped in air pockets within the wreck. These men were doomed unless they were able to move to what was once the bottom of the ship and be rescued before their air supply ran out. Shortly after Tirpitz capsized, parties of sailors climbed onto the hull and painted marks on locations where they heard signs of life. Acetylene torches were needed to cut into the thick hull, but none were initially available. Local Norwegian civilians who owned torches hid them, and only one could be found. During the 24 hours after the attack 87 men were rescued from within the hull. Cutting continued for two further days, until it was assessed that the oxygen supply inside the wreck would have been exhausted; no survivors were recovered during this period. Estimates of the total number of sailors and officers killed vary, with the most common figures lying between 940 and 1,204. Weber and all of his senior officers were among the dead.

Many Norwegian civilians in Tromsø were pleased that Tirpitz had been destroyed, not least as it meant the end of an order requiring that they billet part of her crew. Several civilians who showed pleasure at the event in public were arrested by the Gestapo. Other Norwegians were saddened by the way that the battleship's crew had died.

Work began on stripping Tirpitz's wreck soon after rescue efforts ended and continued until the late 1950s. Before the end of the war, German personnel removed the ship's bronze propellers and some other components to be melted down. The wreck was sold to a Norwegian scrap dealing company in 1948 and broken up in situ. Salvage work concluded in 1957, by which time most remnants of the battleship had been removed. The corpses which were recovered from the wreck by scrappers were initially buried alongside unwanted parts of Tirpitz, but this ceased following complaints by a local church minister. The remains of hundreds of other crewmembers were recovered and interred in Norwegian cemeteries.

=== Return to base ===
One of the No. 9 Squadron Lancasters was badly damaged by anti-aircraft gunfire, and its pilot decided to attempt a crash-landing in Sweden. The crew were able to make radio contact with Swedish military forces manning a small airfield at Naisjärv, who prepared it for the bomber. When one of the Lancaster's engines cut out while attempting to land, the pilot made a belly landing in a field near a village. None of the crew were injured, and all were interned by the Swedish Government. They were subsequently repatriated to the UK.

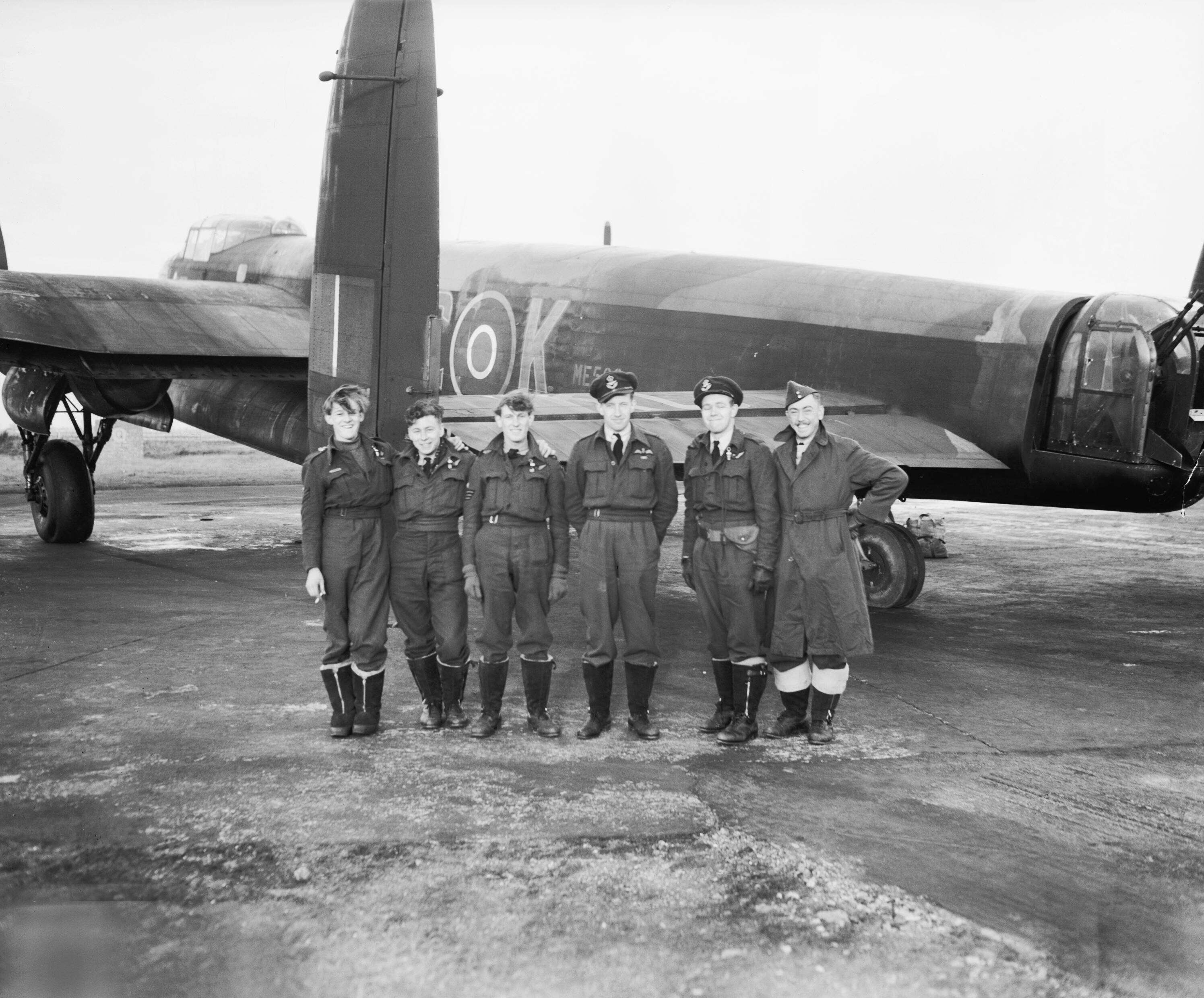
A No. 617 Squadron crew shortly after returning from Operation Catechism

The other Lancasters' return flights were complicated by adverse winds. Due to shortages of fuel, many had to divert to alternative airfields but all landed safely during the afternoon of 12 November. Two Lancasters landed at RAF Banff, one of which still carried its Tallboy which had hung up. After it taxied to a halt, and moments after the crew left the aircraft, the Tallboy released itself and clattered to the concrete. The film aircraft flew directly to its home station, RAF Waddington, where its pilot was debriefed by Air Commodore Cochrane. The bomber squadrons returned to their home bases over the next two days.

In the days after the attack, the airmen received congratulations from King George VI, Prime Minister Winston Churchill, the War Cabinet and many others. They were also all granted a 48-hour period of leave. Churchill was congratulated by his fellow Allied leaders Franklin D. Roosevelt and Joseph Stalin. The Air Ministry issued a communique announcing Tirpitz's destruction on 13 November, leading to celebratory stories in many British newspapers the next day. The story was also prominently reported in many other countries. Tait and Williams travelled to London on 14 November for a press conference. The two airmen also gave interviews; Tait described the raid in a BBC broadcast and Williams spoke with American CBS correspondent Edward R. Murrow. The success of Operation Catechism led to celebrations in Allied countries. Tirpitz was seen as a symbol of the Nazi regime, and her destruction provided further evidence that the war was coming to an end. Tait was privately sceptical of the value of the operation, and later noted in his private papers that it "had not contributed much to the Allied victory" as the battleship was already crippled.

Many of the aircrew involved in Operation Catechism were decorated for their part in the attack. Cochrane recommended Tait for the Victoria Cross. This was endorsed by Air Chief Marshal Sir Arthur Harris, the head of Bomber Command, but the medal was not awarded. Instead, Tait received a third bar to his Distinguished Service Order (DSO). The citation recognised his "conspicuous bravery and extreme devotion to duty in the face of the enemy, constantly exemplified over a long period of operational flying" and role in leading three attacks on Tirpitz. Two other pilots received the DSO and six airmen were awarded the Distinguished Flying Cross.

Tirpitz's destruction freed up Allied resources for other theatres. More than half the Home Fleet was deployed elsewhere, including many ships sent to the Pacific to fight Japanese forces.

== Assessments ==
=== German ===
The loss of Tirpitz was a disaster for the German military in northern Norway. In addition to the loss of life, the battleship's destruction left the Kriegsmarine without any of the capital ships needed to threaten Allied convoy routes. Ehrler and several personnel assigned to observer posts, anti-aircraft guns and ships were court martialled and imprisoned. Ehrler was convicted in relation to leaving his unit's operations room under the command of a non-commissioned officer on 12 November. He was sentenced to three years' imprisonment, but was released after a month and demoted. He was killed in combat on 4 April 1945. Many commentators and members of JG 5 believe that Ehrler was scapegoated. Dönitz also ordered that an inquiry be held into why the battleship capsized. This concluded that "the actual depth of the prepared berth did not conform with the requirements and directions of the commander-in-chief".

It is unclear why the fighters at Bardufoss failed to protect the battleship. Much of the relevant documentation did not survive the war and accounts from survivors are at times contradictory. Sweetman judged that the failure ultimately resulted from the order to intercept the bombers being issued too late and a lack of clear plans to coordinate the defence. He attributed the former to delays in recognising that the bombers were headed for Tirpitz, as well as inefficient chains of communication that slowed the speed with which this information could be acted on. For instance, German naval personnel could not pass information directly to their Luftwaffe equivalents, as messages had to be sent through single-service channels and could only be transmitted between services at relatively senior levels. The historian Daniel Knowles reached a similar conclusion, labelling Tirpitz's defences "chaotic" due to the poor communications between the battleship and Bardufoss.

=== British ===
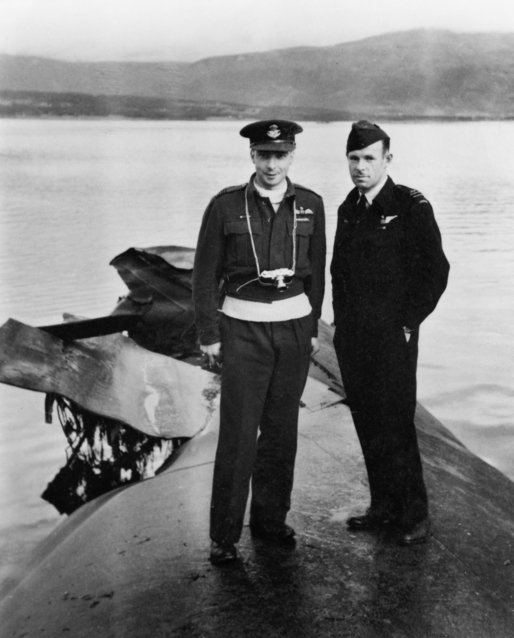
RAF Wing Commander Willie Tait (at left) and an Australian officer standing on the wreck of Tirpitz in late 1945

The British military undertook several analyses of the attack. In December 1944, No. 5 Group's headquarters investigated the accuracy of the bombing. This analysis found that No. 617 Squadron had been much more accurate than No. 9 Squadron, possibly due to the latter squadron's bombardiers inputting an inaccurate wind speed into their bombsights. The superior Stabilized Automatic Bomb Sight fitted to No. 617 Squadron's aircraft may have also contributed to the difference.

On 21–22 May 1945, after the end of the war in Europe, an RAF team travelled to Norway to investigate the causes of Tirpitz's sinking. During the trip they inspected the wreck of the battleship and interviewed key German officers. In their report, the team noted that the damage inflicted on Tirpitz during Operations Source and Paravane had never been fully repaired. The team concluded that the battleship had been directly hit by two Tallboys. A team from the Royal Navy's Directorate of Naval Construction also inspected the wreck between 4 September and 14 October 1945, and interviewed witnesses to the attack. This team judged that a lack of watertight integrity resulting from flaws in Tirpitz's design, as well as the watertight doors that divided compartments being left open as the crew evacuated, led the battleship to rapidly capsize. Sweetman noted that "there was, thus, no single cause of Tirpitz's ultimate loss", as it resulted from the combination of two direct hits, the damage caused by five near misses and problems with the battleship's design.

=== Historiography ===
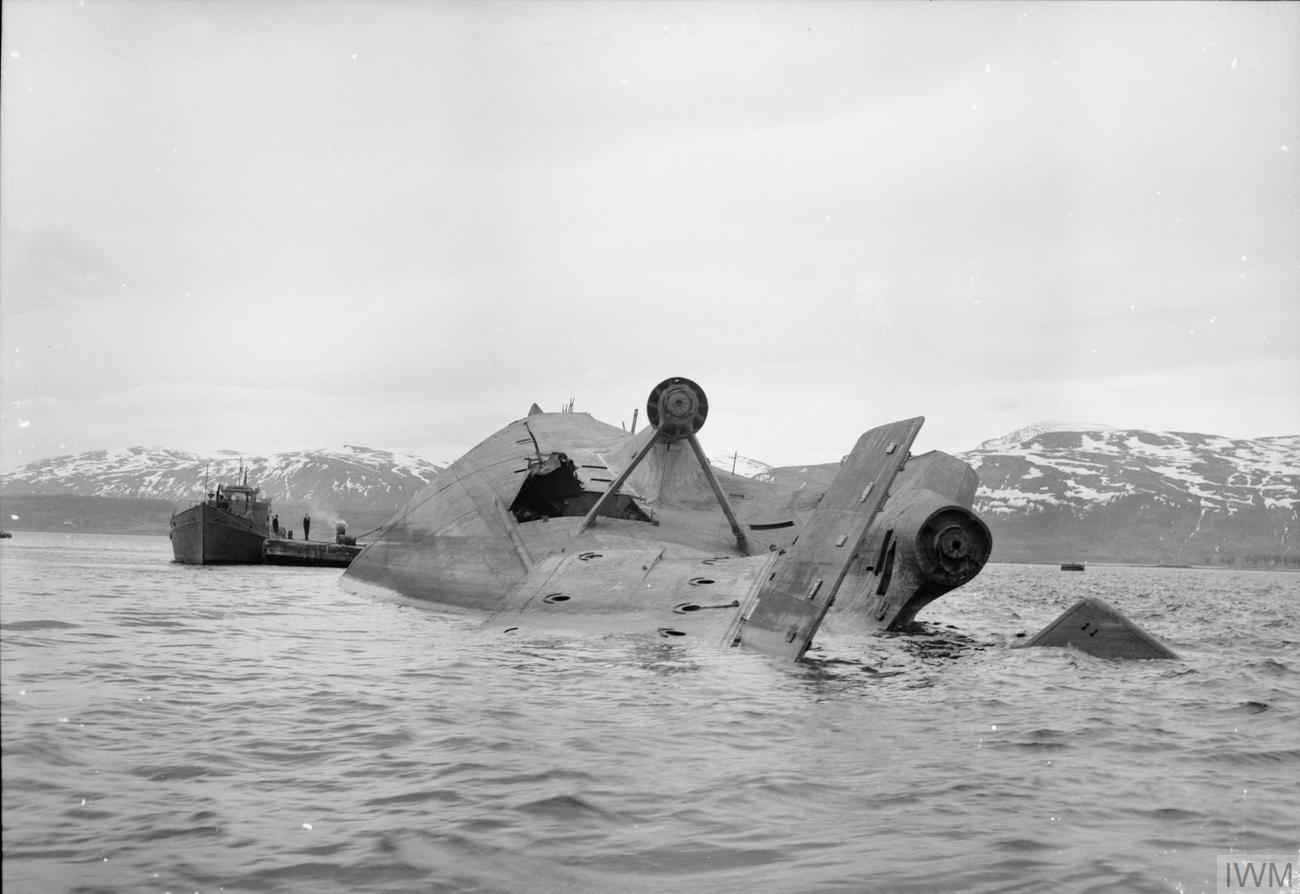
The wreck of Tirpitz after the war

Historians hold differing views over whether the final attacks on Tirpitz were necessary. Angus Konstam has written that the battleship posed no threat to Allied shipping from April 1944 due to the damage inflicted in Operations Source and Tungsten. He argued that the subsequent attacks were motivated by Churchill and other members of the War Cabinet having an "obsession" with destroying Tirpitz, and that Operations Obviate and Catechism were mainly undertaken for propaganda purposes. Patrick Bishop has observed that "the zeal of the pursuit, whipped on by Churchill, seems excessive now, but wartime created its own dynamic", and that Operation Catechism contributed little towards ending the war. Similarly, Niklas Zetterling and Michael Tamelander have judged that although "the British were not fully aware that the Germans had written off Tirpitz as an offensive weapon in autumn 1944, their final efforts appear almost overzealous". The official history of British intelligence in World War II states that Dönitz's use of the battleship to tie down Allied resources was successful, and "in her last days she briefly excelled" in this role.

Other historians believe that the attacks were justified. Sweetman has written that while the Allied intelligence services erred in believing that Tirpitz could be repaired and returned to service following Operation Paravane, the British leadership acted correctly on the information available to them by ordering further attacks. John Ellis reached a similar conclusion, and also argued that Operations Obviate and Catechism were justified as they contributed to sustaining the Fortitude North deception campaign that had led the Germans to maintain powerful ground forces in Norway in the mistaken belief that the Allies were planning amphibious landings there. The retired United States Navy Rear Admiral William H. Langenberg judged that "because of her strategic importance, all the Allied attempts to disable or sink Tirpitz were justified".

There is consensus that the engagement was well executed by the Allied forces while the German forces failed. Konstam noted that Operations Paravane, Obviate and Catechism were "well-planned and conducted" and "provided a neat ending to what had been a long and often tortuous aerial campaign". Sweetman wrote that while the Royal Navy's aircraft and bombs could have destroyed Tirpitz "with luck", the combination of the highly-capable Lancaster bomber and the powerful Tallboy bomb was better suited to this task as it removed "any element of luck, provided accuracy could be obtained". Bishop stated that while Tirpitz's crew "did their duty and defended their ship to the last", the Luftwaffe failed. Jan Forsgren observed that the lack of attention given to the battleship's defence by the German high command was "quite remarkable" in light of the previous British attacks.

== Commemoration ==
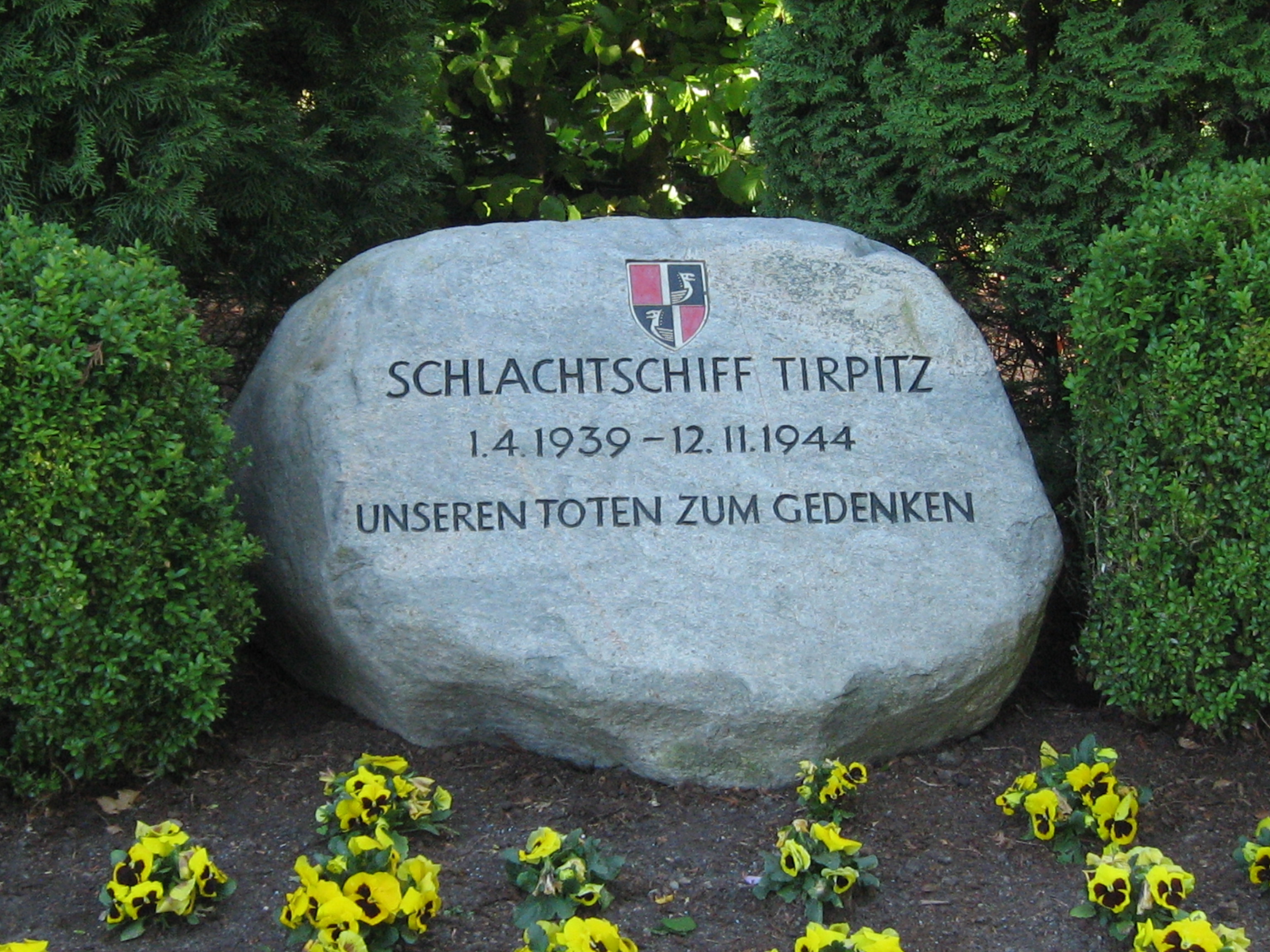
The memorial to Tirpitz at the Ehrenfriedhof cemetery in Wilhelmshaven

Nos. 9 and 617 Squadrons have a rivalry over which unit deserves credit for destroying Tirpitz that began immediately after Operation Catechism. In 1950 the Norwegian Government presented the RAF with part of a bulkhead from the wreck which Tirpitz's crew had painted with a representation of the battleship. This was initially displayed at RAF Binbrook, from which both Nos. 9 and 617 Squadrons had operated at times during World War II. It was soon stolen by No. 9 Squadron personnel and installed at the unit's headquarters. Over the next 50 years the squadrons conducted elaborate operations to steal the trophy from one another. It was handed to the Royal Air Force Museum in 2002, and is currently displayed at Royal Air Force Museum London. The Museum also has a link from one of Tirpitz's anchor chains on display.

Tirpitz is commemorated by several monuments. The main memorial is a small granite slab in memory of the ship and the sailors killed on board her at the Ehrenfriedhof cemetery in Wilhelmshaven, Germany. Tirpitz survivors held a ceremony at the cemetery's chapel on 12 November each year until at least 2014. The Tirpitz Museum at Kaafjord houses items and photographs associated with the battleship. Items removed from the wreck are displayed at a museum in Tromsø as well as other museums around the world. Some of the battleship's armour plates were sold to the Norwegian Public Roads Administration, which still uses them to cover excavations on roads in the Oslo region. The remnants of the battleship in the water off Håkøya are registered as a protected area and treated as a war grave.
