= Sandven =

Sandven is a surname. Notable people with the surname include:

- Johannes Sandven (1909–2000), Norwegian educator;
- Liv Sandven (born 1946), Norwegian politician.
