= Bjarne Ness =

Norwegian painter (1902–1927)

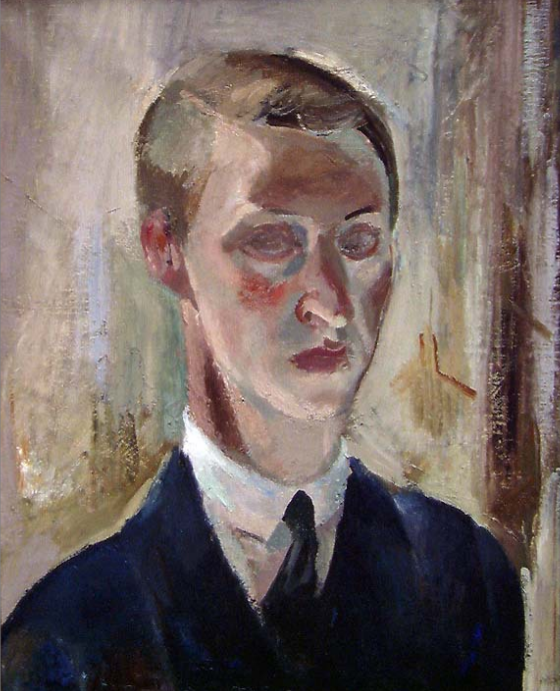
- Self portrait
- Born: 17 March 1902; Trondheim, Norway
- Died: 13 December 1927 (aged 25); Paris, France
- Occupations: Painter; Illustrator

Bjarne Ness (17 March 1902 – 13 December 1927) was a Norwegian painter and illustrator.

== Biography ==
He was born in Trondheim, Norway to Bernhard Ness and Elise Konstanse Olsen. He was the eldest of six siblings. He received his first professional drawing lessons at the Norwegian Institute of Technology with Harald Krohg Stabell (1874-1963). In 1923 he attended the railway school in Hamar. In 1924 he became a student at the painting school of Axel Revold. In 1925 he exhibited at the Autumn Exhibition in Oslo. In 1927 he traveled to Paris, but he suffered from tuberculosis and died a month later, only 25 years old.

Among his paintings are Badende kvinner i skogen from 1926, Pietà (1926, originally bought by Fridtjof Nansen, and currently in the National Gallery of Norway), Komposisjon (1926, acquired by art collector Johannes Sejersted Bødtker, and later donated to the National Gallery), Feieren (1927), Musikanten (1927) and Fiolinisten (1927).

== Related reading ==
- Hellandsjø, Karin (1985) Bjarne Ness, brev og opptegnelser (Oslo: Universitetsforlaget) ISBN 978-8200075059
