= Jørgen Adolf Lier =

Norwegian politician (1906–1994)

Jørgen Adolf Lier (31 January 1906 – 15 January 1994) was a Norwegian politician for the Labour Party.

He served as a deputy representative to the Norwegian Parliament from Østfold during the terms 1958–1961 and 1961–1965.

Lier was born in Askim and a member of Askim municipality council from 1934 to 1940, 1945 to 1955 and 1959 to 1971, serving as mayor in the periods 1945–1947, 1951–1955 and 1965–1971. He was a member of Østfold county council in the periods 1945–1947, 1951–1955 and 1965–1967.
