= Anders Waagan =

Norwegian footballer (born 2000)

Personal information
- Full name: Anders Myking Waagan
- Date of birth: 18 February 2000 (age 26)
- Place of birth: Ålesund, Norway
- Height: 1.80 m (5 ft 11 in)
- Position: Striker

Team information
- Current team: Spjelkavik
- Number: 22

Youth career
- IL Ravn
- Aalesund

Senior career*
Years	Team	Apps	(Gls)
2017–2018	Aalesund	2	(0)
2018–	Spjelkavik	39	(21)

International career^{‡}
2016	Norway U16	15	(2)
2017	Norway U17	12	(1)
- * Club domestic league appearances and goals as of 21 July 2020 ‡ National team caps and goals as of 23 August 2019

Anders Waagan (born 18 February 2000) is a Norwegian footballer who plays as a forward for Spjelkavik IL. He has featured 12 times for the Norway national under-17 football team, scoring 1 goal, and made his debut in Eliteserien at the age of 17 in 2017.
