= Sigurd Marius Johansen =

Norwegian politician

Sigurd Marius Johansen (11 June 1906 – 19 February 1989) was a Norwegian politician for the Labour Party. He served as a deputy representative to the Norwegian Parliament from Østfold during the 1954–1957 and 1958–1961 terms.
