= Gulborg Nygaard =

Norwegian politician

Gulborg Nygaard (18 April 1902 – 17 April 1991) was a Norwegian politician for the Liberal Party.

She served as a deputy representative to the Norwegian Parliament from Vest-Agder during the term of 1954–1957.
