= Syvdefjorden =

Fjord in Vanylven, Norway

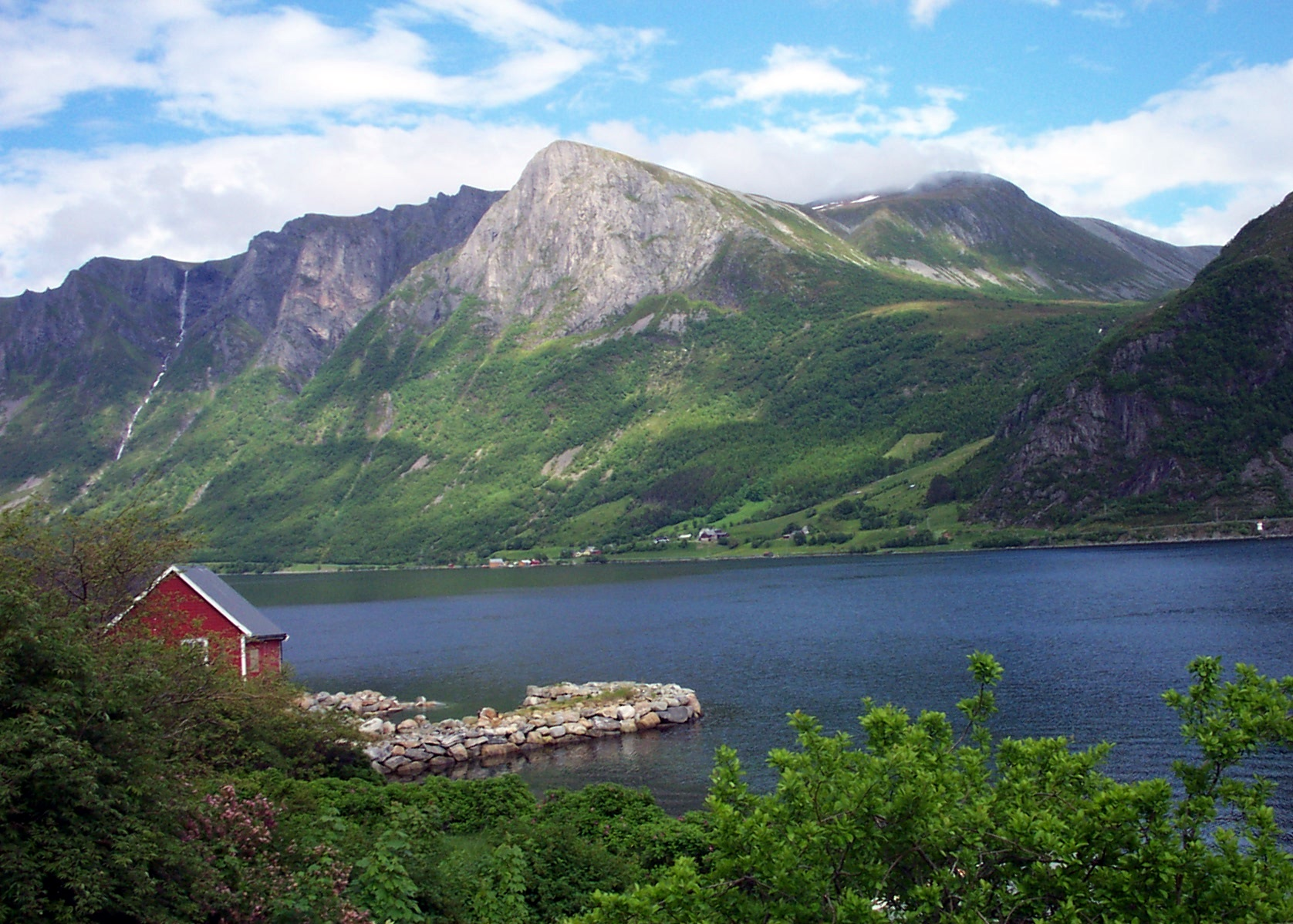
- View of the Syvdsfjorden (seen from Eidså)
- Interactive map of the fjord
- Location: Møre og Romsdal county, Norway
- Coordinates: 62.0918°N 5.7296°E
- Type: Fjord
- Basin countries: Norway
- Max. length: 10 kilometres (6.2 mi)
- Max. width: 1.5 kilometres (0.93 mi)
- Max. depth: −328 metres (−1,076 ft)
- Settlements: Syvde, Eidså

Syvdefjorden is a fjord in Vanylven Municipality in Møre og Romsdal county, Norway. The 10-kilometre (6.2 mi) long fjord flows from the village of Syvde to the north until it empties into the Rovdefjorden. The sides of the fjord are mountainous, particularly the eastern side, with mountainsides stretching up to 800 metres (2,600 ft) high coming right out of the water. The old Syvde Municipality was centered on this fjord until it was merged into Vanylven Municipality in 1964.

== See also ==
- List of Norwegian fjords
