= Project Deep Spill =

First intentional deep-water oil spill

Project Deep Spill was the first intentional deepwater oil spill, in order to study how crude oil behaved in-depth. A Joint Industry Project comprising 23 oil companies and the Minerals Management Service performed a sea trial in late June 2000 in the Helland Hansen region of the Norwegian Sea. The trial made several releases of varying combinations of crude oil (750 barrels), marine diesel, methane (18 cubic metres) and nitrogen gas from the seabed at 840 metres below sea-level.
