= Johan Jentoft Johansen =

Norwegian politician

Johan Jentoft Johansen (20 April 1906 - 21 April 1973) was a Norwegian politician for the Liberal Party.

Johansen served as a deputy representative to the Norwegian Parliament from the Market towns of Nordland, Troms and Finnmark during the term 1937–1945 and from Telemark during the term 1958–1961.
