= Andreas Holm (politician) =

Norwegian politician

Andreas Holm (29 May 1906 – 13 January 2003) was a Norwegian politician for the Centre Party.

He served as a deputy representative to the Norwegian Parliament from Aust-Agder during the terms 1954–1957 and 1961–1965.
