= Oslo Police Museum =

Law enforcement museum in Oslo, Norway

Coordinates: 59°54′55″N 10°45′03″E

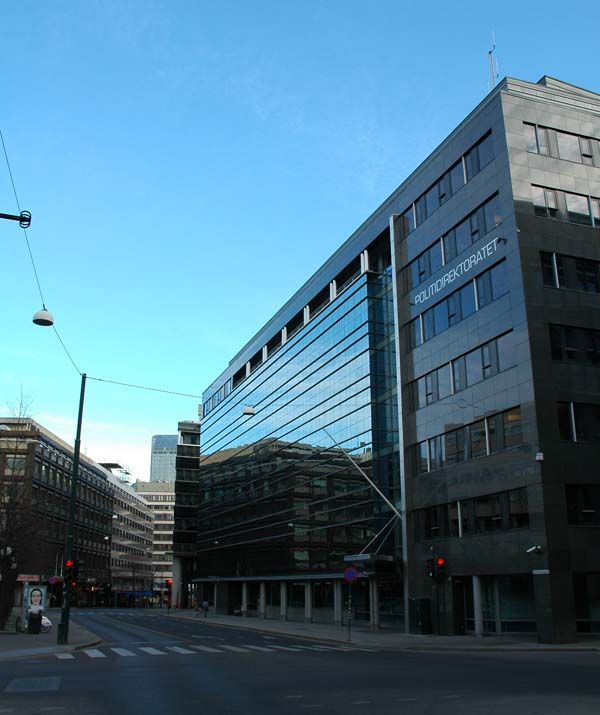
Oslo Police Museum at Hammersborggata 12

Oslo Police Museum (Norwegian: Politimuseet i Oslo) is a Police Museum in Oslo, Norway. The museum was established in 1902. Until 1973, it was known as the Criminal Museum (Kriminalmuseet) . The museum documents the history of police work in the city of Oslo. The museum is housed at the Oslo Central police station (Sentrum politistasjon) located at Hammersborggata 12 in the central Oslo neighborhood of St. Hanshaugen. Other police museum in Norway are maintained in Trondheim and Bergen.

== Other sources ==
- Kuijpers, Henk (1986) Kriminalmuseet (Oslo: Hjemmet-Serieforl) ISBN 8273155099
