= Syvde, Møre og Romsdal =

Village in Vanylven Municipality, Norway

Syvde Myklebost
- Village
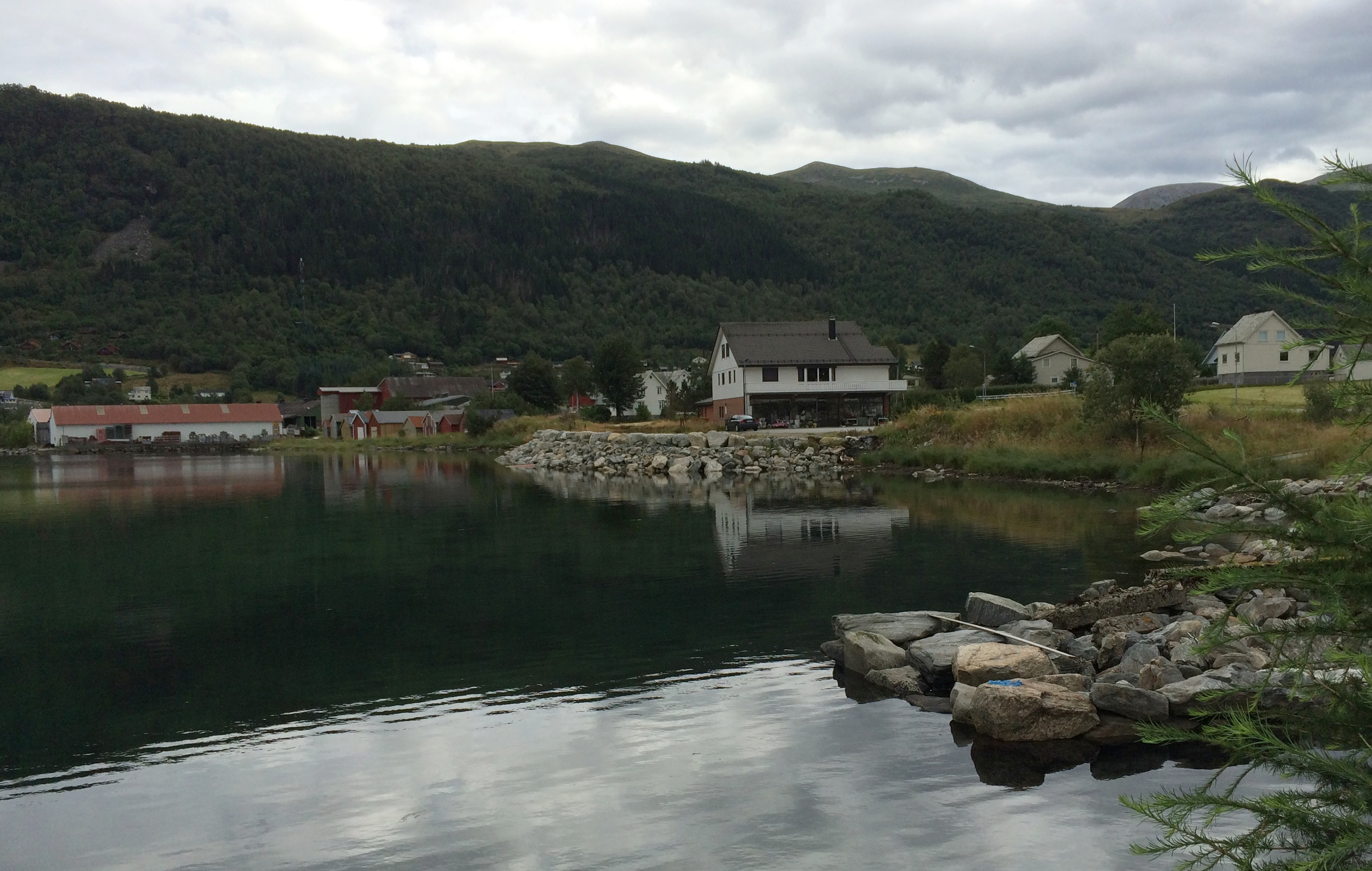
- View of the village shoreline
- Interactive map of Syvde
- Location within Møre og Romsdal Location within Norway
- Coordinates: 62.0890°N 5.7395°E
- Country: Norway
- Region: Western Norway
- County: Møre og Romsdal
- District: Sunnmøre
- Municipality: Vanylven Municipality

Area
  - Total: 0.76 km^{2} (0.29 sq mi)
- Elevation: 3 m (9.8 ft)

Population (2012)
  - Total: 393
  - Density: 517/km^{2} (1,340/sq mi)
- Time zone: UTC+01:00 (CET)
  - Summer (DST): UTC+02:00 (CEST)
- Post Code: 6140 Syvde

Syvde (or Myklebost) is a village in Vanylven Municipality in Møre og Romsdal county, Norway. The village is located at the end of the Syvdsfjorden about 12 kilometres (7.5 mi) east of the municipal center of Fiskå and 16 kilometres (9.9 mi) south of the village of Rovdane.

The 0.76-square-kilometre (190-acre) village had a population (2012) of 393 and a population density of 517 inhabitants per square kilometre (1,340/sq mi). Since 2012, the population and area data for this village area has not been separately tracked by Statistics Norway.

== History ==
The village was the administrative centre for the old Syvde Municipality which existed from 1918 until 1964 when it was merged into Vanylven Municipality. The main church for the Syvde area is Syvde Church, located in Myklebost, right along the fjord.

The village was historically known as Myklebost, but due to being the centre of the old Syvde Municipality, it has become popularly known as Syvde, which is now the common name for the village area. Statistics Norway referred to the area as Myklebost until 2012 when it no longer qualified as an urban settlement.
