= Petter Jacob Semb Meyer =

Norwegian politician

- Born: 22 March 1902; Tjølling Municipality, Norway
- Died: 7 December 1987 (aged 85); Notodden Municipality, Norway
- Occupations: Barrister; Judge; Politician

Petter Jacob Semb Meyer (22 March 1902 – 7 December 1987) was a Norwegian barrister, judge and politician.

He was born in Tjølling Municipality to ship owner Børre Anton Meyer and Maren Semb Meyer, and graduated as cand.jur. in 1924. He was elected representative to the Storting for the period 1937–1945, for the Conservative Party. He served as judge of the Eidsivating Court of Appeal from 1961–1972.
