= Syvde Church =

Church in Møre og Romsdal, Norway

- Syvde kyrkje
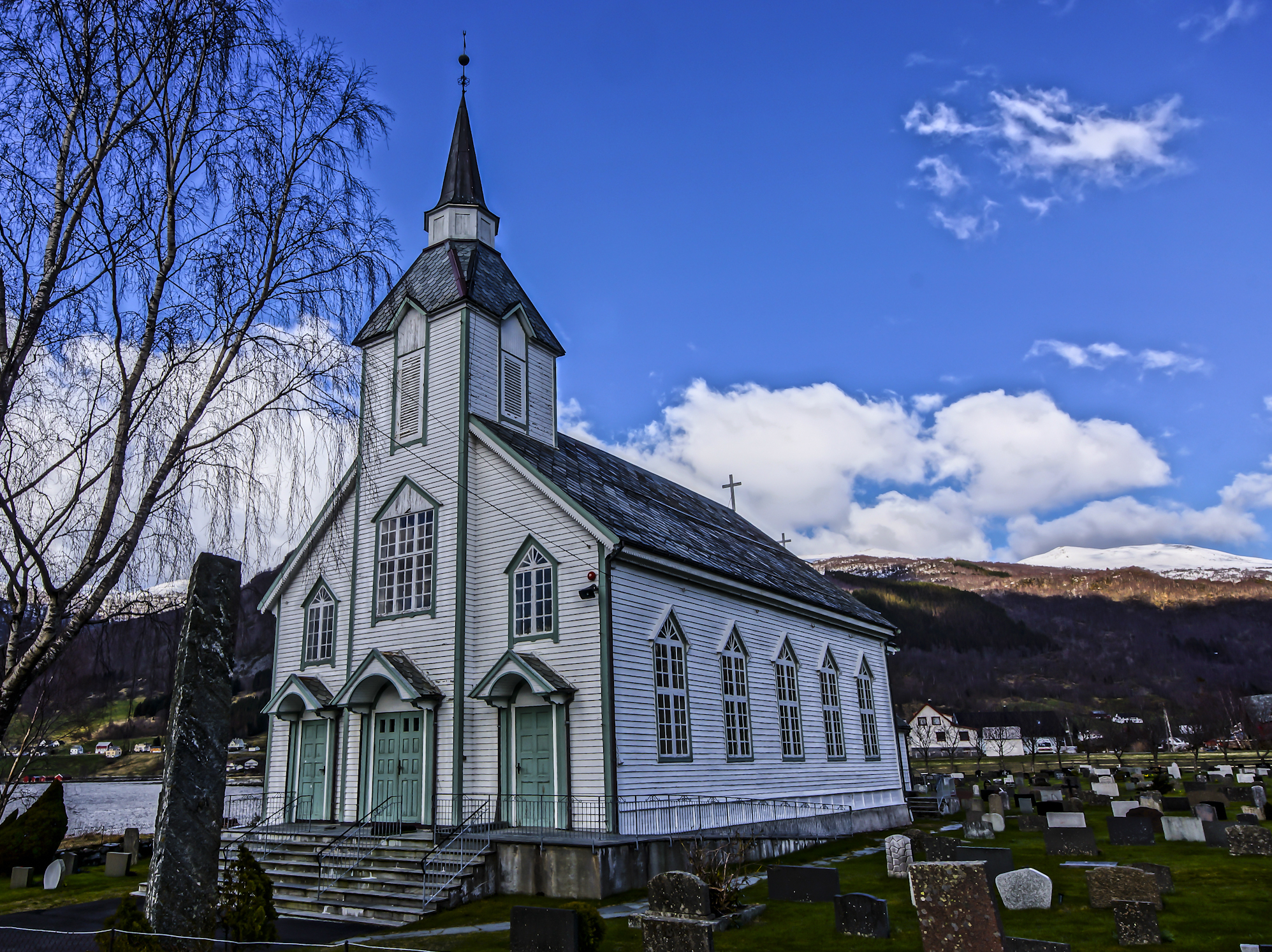
- View of the church
- Syvde Church
- 62°05′27″N 5°44′38″E
- Location: Vanylven Municipality, Møre og Romsdal
- Country: Norway
- Denomination: Church of Norway
- Churchmanship: Evangelical Lutheran

History
- Status: Parish church
- Founded: 14th century
- Consecrated: 13 November 1937

Architecture
- Functional status: Active
- Architectural type: Long church
- Completed: 1837 (189 years ago)

Specifications
- Capacity: 392
- Materials: Wood

Administration
- Diocese: Møre bispedømme
- Deanery: Søre Sunnmøre prosti
- Parish: Syvde
- Norwegian Cultural Heritage Site
- Type: Church
- Status: Automatically protected
- ID: 85028

Syvde Church (Norwegian: Syvde kyrkje) is a parish church of the Church of Norway in Vanylven Municipality in Møre og Romsdal county, Norway. It is located in the village of Syvde. It is the church for the Syvde parish which is part of the Søre Sunnmøre prosti (deanery) in the Diocese of Møre. The white, wooden church was built in a long church design in 1837 using plans drawn up by an unknown architect. The church seats about 392 people.

== History ==
The earliest existing historical records of the church date back to 1432 in Aslak Bolt's cadastre, but the church was already existing at that time. The first church in Syvde was likely a wooden stave church that was possibly built in the 14th century. The original church site was at Myklebust, about 750 metres (2,460 ft) to the southwest of the present church site. The oldest written sources that describe the church building say that the small, old stave church had a rectangular nave with a choir on the south end and a church porch on the west end. In 1677, the old pulpit from the old Ulstein Church was moved to this church and installed in it.

The church sat on the plains at the bottom of a river valley and sometimes the river would flood and much of the valley would be submerged during these brief periods of occasional flooding. Because of this, the church site was not ideal. In the 1830s, the church was in poor shape and in need of replacement. The parish decided to not only build a new church, but also to move the church site a different location, near the fjord and further from the river. In 1836, the old church was torn down and its materials were sold to a private individual. Then in 1836-1837, a new church was built about 750 metres (2,460 ft) to the northeast of the old church site. The new church was consecrated by the rector on 13 November 1837, having been postponed by one day due to bad weather.

In 1870-1871, the church was renovated and enlarged. The roof was removed and the nave was widened by about 3 metres (9.8 ft). A new roof was installed at a higher level, about 1.5 metres (4 ft 11 in) higher than the previous roof. In 1907, the western wall of the nave was removed and the nave was lengthened by about 4 metres (13 ft). After lengthening the nave, a new church porch and tower were built on the west end of the church. This renovation gave the church its characteristic look with its three main doors to the building. During the 1950s, the sacristy was enlarged on the east end of the building.

== See also ==
- List of churches in Møre
