= Asle Enger =

Norwegian priest (1906–2000)

Asle Enger (15 August 1906 – 27 January 2000) was a Norwegian priest.

== Personal life ==
Born in Ådal on 15 August 1906, Enger was a son of farmer Elling Aslesen Enger and Olava Ringerud. He married Ellen Berg in 1933.

== Career ==
Enger volunteered as priest for Norwegian military officers in German prisoner-of-war camps during World War II, from 1943 to 1945. He was decorated Knight, First Class of the Order of St. Olav in 1946. In 1950 he published the book Med feltprestens øyne.
