= Atle Roll-Matthiesen =

Norwegian judge (1906–1990)

- Born: 9 August 1906; Aurland, Norway
- Died: 1990
- Occupation: Judge

Atle Roll-Matthiesen (9 August 1906 – 1990) was a Norwegian judge.

He was born in Aurland Municipality to physician Alf Matthiesen and Laura Roll. He graduated as cand.jur. in 1927, and was named as a Supreme Court Justice from 1958.
