= Magnus Jensen (historian) =

Norwegian historian and educator (1902–1990)

Magnus Jensen (30 January 1902 – 15 July 1990) was a Norwegian historian and educator. He was born in Arendal. During the German occupation of Norway he was a member of the undercover leadership of the teachers' civil resistance from 1942. From 1943 he represented the teachers in the Coordination Committee of the Norwegian Resistance Movement, and was later a member of Kretsen and Hjemmefrontens Ledelse. (Koordinasjonskomiteen was the largest and most activist Resistance group [in Norway] among civilians, according to Olav Njølstad.)

He served as principal at Aars og Voss school in Oslo from 1953 to 1969. Among his books are Norgeshistorie fra 1660 til våre dager (first edition from 1938), and Nordens historie for gymnasiet from 1940.
