= Dagmar Maalstad =

Norwegian politician

Dagmar Maalstad (3 April 1902 - 27 June 2000) was a Norwegian politician for the Conservative Party.

From 1935 to 1948 she led the Norwegian Girl Guide Organization.

She served as a deputy representative to the Norwegian Parliament from Hordaland during the term 1958–1961.
