= Olaug Hay =

Norwegian politician

Olaug Hay (15 January 1902 – 9 January 2000) was a Norwegian politician for the Conservative Party.

Hay hailed from Hammerfest. She served as a deputy representative to the Norwegian Parliament from Finnmark during the term 1954–1957.
