= Egil Lindberg =

Norwegian radio officer and Secret Intelligence Service agent during World War II

Egil Lindberg (6 June 1906 – 25 June 1952) was a Norwegian radio officer and Secret Intelligence Service agent during World War II.

He had a background from the weather stations at Jan Mayen and Bjørnøya. From 1943 he operated the station Upsilon in Tromsø, with the primary goal of reporting on German warships, in particular Tirpitz and Scharnhorst.
