= Asbjørn Øye =

Norwegian politician

Asbjørn Øye (21 May 1902 – 15 November 1998) was a Norwegian politician for the Liberal Party.

He served as a deputy representative to the Norwegian Parliament from Møre og Romsdal during the term 1945–1949.
