= Johannes Sandven =

Johannes Sandven (1 November 1909 – 2 September 2000) was a Norwegian educator. He was born in Fana. He was appointed professor at the University of Oslo from 1950 to 1979. He was a co-founder and editor of the journal Scandinavian Journal of Educational Research. He was decorated Knight, First Class of the Order of St. Olav in 1980.
