= 1904 in Norway =

- Centuries: 18th; 19th; 20th; 21st
- Decades: 1880s; 1890s; 1900s; 1910s; 1920s
- See also: 1904 in Sweden; List of years in Norway

Events in the year 1904 in Norway.

== Incumbents ==
- Monarch – Oscar II.
- Prime Minister – Francis Hagerup

== Events ==
- 23 January – Ålesund Fire: a major fire break out during the night in the town of Ålesund. The fire destroyed almost the whole city centre, built mostly of wood like the majority of Norwegian towns in that era. The Fire left nearly 10,000 people homeless.
- 22 March – The profession of attorney was opened for women; Elise Sem opened an attorney's office as the first woman in Europe
- 28 June – The Danish ocean liner SS Norge runs aground and sinks close to Rockall, killing 635, including 225 Norwegian emigrants
- 1 November – The Flekkefjord Line is opened.
- The town of Harstad is founded.

== Popular culture ==
=== Music ===
- December – Adolf Østbye, revue artist, made the first gramophone record in Norway

== Notable births ==
=== January ===
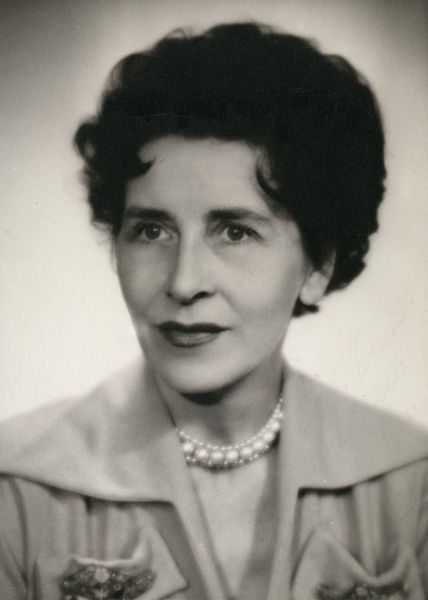
Ella Hval

- 7 January – Ella Hval, actress (died 1994).
- 17 January – Lillemor Aars, ceramist and artisan (died 1992).
- 20 January – Alf Pedersen, boxer (died 1925)
- 22 January – Berge Helle Kringlebotn, politician (died 1992)
- 24 January – Martin Rasmussen Hjelmen, sailor and activist (died 1944).
- 28 January – Hans Heiberg, journalist, literary critic, theatre critic, essayist, novelist, playwright, translator and theatre director (died 1978).

=== February ===
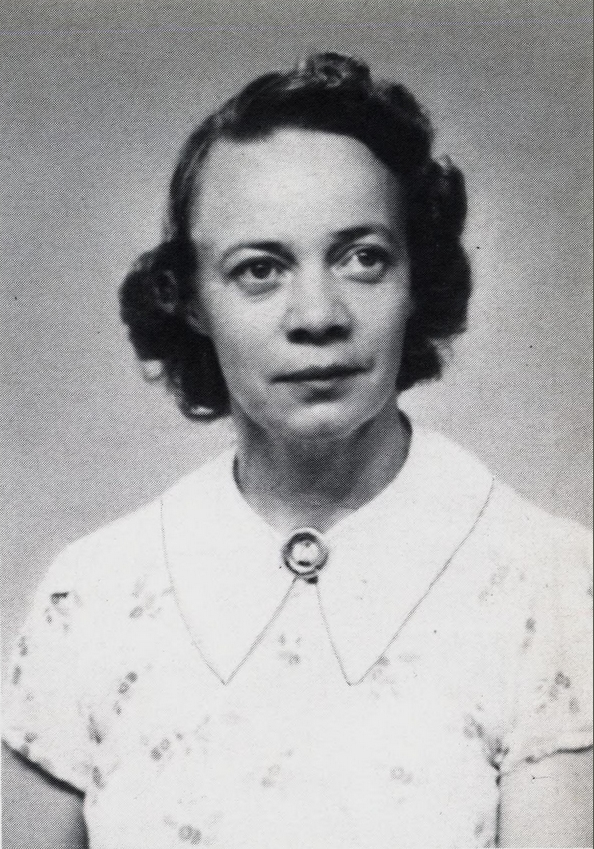
Åsta Holth

- 4 February – Werner Nilsen, soccer player in America (died 1992)
- 13 February – Åsta Holth, writer (died 1999).
- 21 February –
  - Axel Heiberg Stang, politician and Minister (died 1974).
  - Henning Thorvaldssøn Astrup, architect (died 1983).

=== March ===
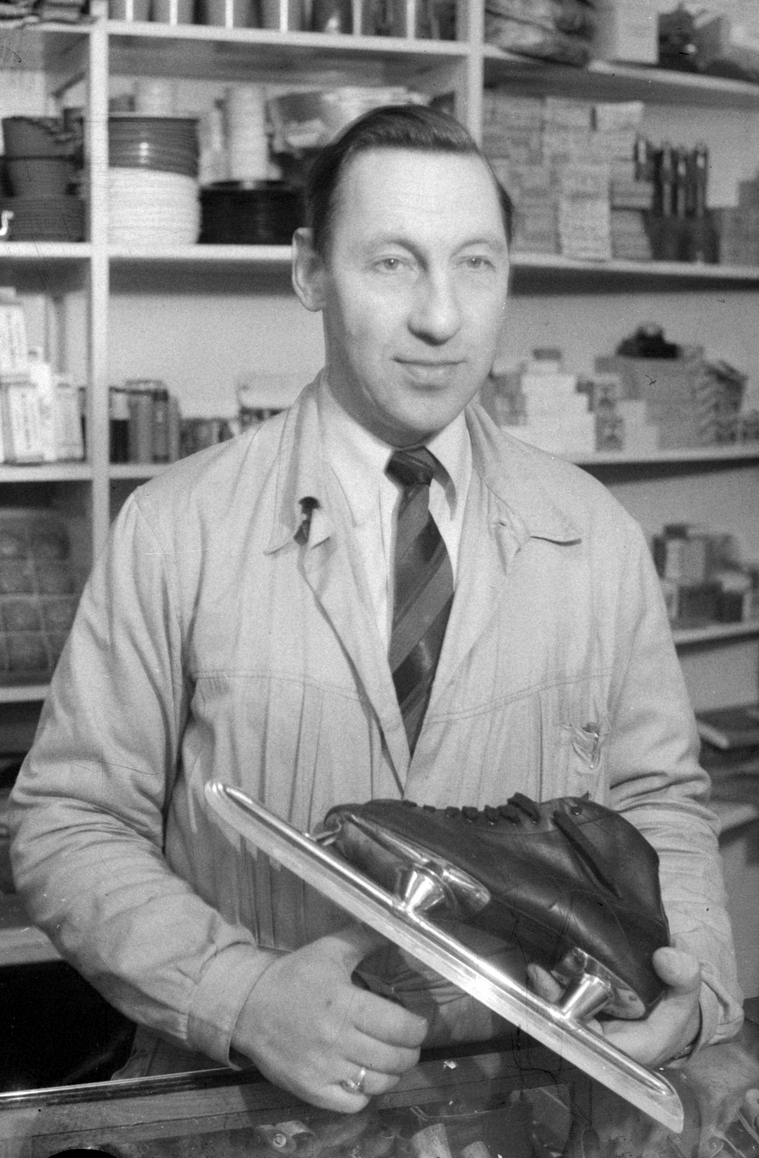
Ivar Ballangrud

- 7 March – Ivar Ballangrud, speed skater and multiple Olympic gold medallist (died 1969)
- 13 March – Reidar Aulie, painter (died 1977).
- 14 March – Olav Rasmussen Langeland, politician (died 1981)
- 16 March – Arne Holst, bobsledder (died 1991)
- 28 March – Ernst Føyn, chemist and oceanographer (died 1984).

=== April ===
- 9 April – Carl Viggo Manthey Lange, politician (died 1999)
- 24 April – Ragnvald Skrede, author, journalist, literature critic and translator (died 1983)

=== May ===
- 6 May – Magnhild Hagelia, politician (died 1996)
- 10 May – Leif Efskind, surgeon (died 1987).

=== June ===
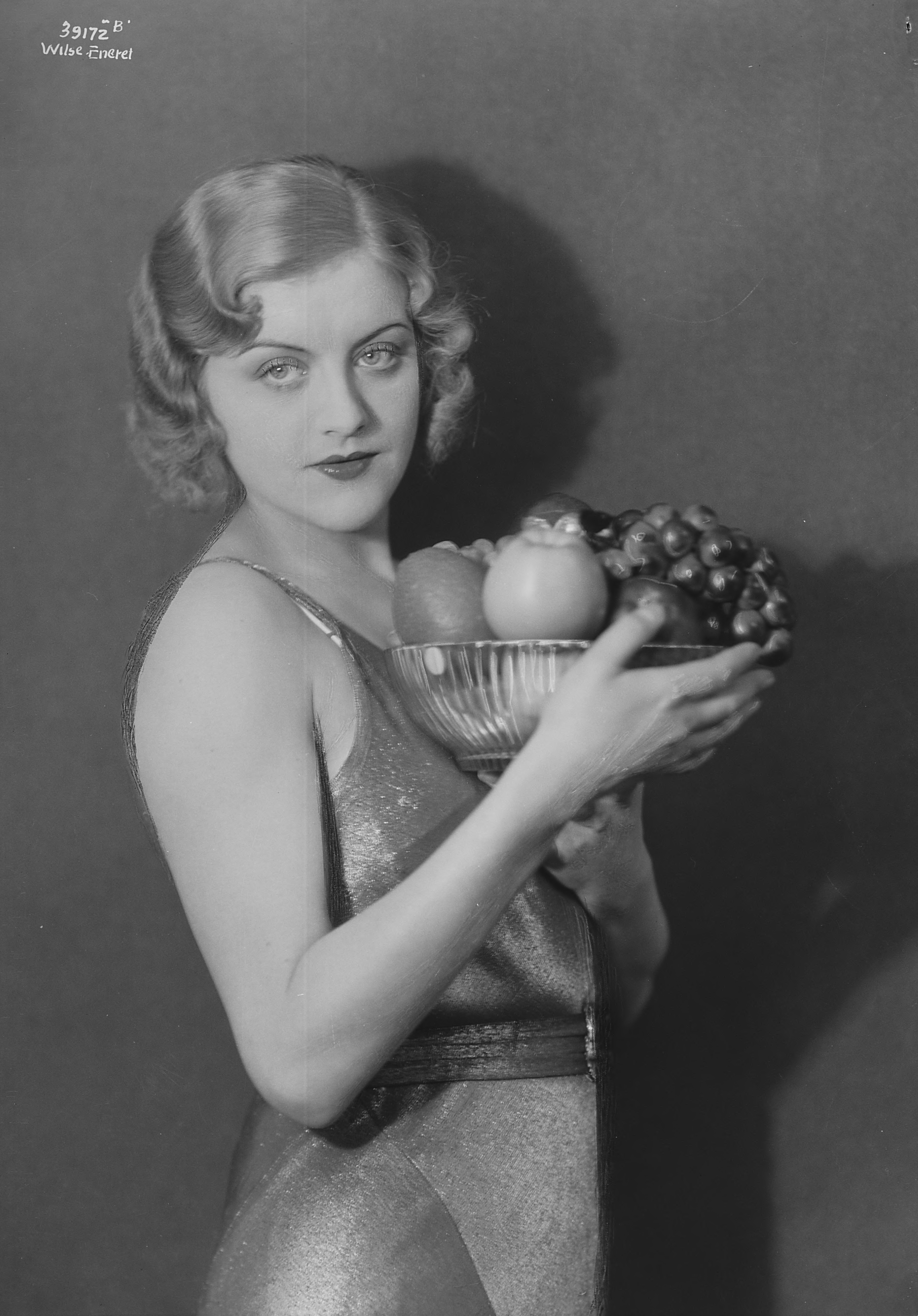
Aase Bye

- 2 June – Harald Johan Løbak, politician and Minister (died 1985)
- 4 June –
  - Mauritz Amundsen, sport shooter (died 1982).
  - Aase Bye, actress (died 1991)
- 15 June – Trond Halvorsen Wirstad, politician (died 1985)
- 18 June – Jomar Brun, chemical engineer. (died 1993)
- 22 June – Lars Fletre, sculptor (died 1977)
- 29 June – Olav Tendeland, lawyer and sports administrator.

=== July ===
- 2 July – Alf Grindrud, politician (died 1959)
- 14 July – Reidar Andreas Lyseth, politician (died 1987)
- 17 July – Henrik Svensen, politician (died 2007)
- 21 July – Henry Johansen, international soccer player (died 1988)

=== August ===
- 15 August – Bjarne Henry Henriksen, politician (died 1995)

=== September ===
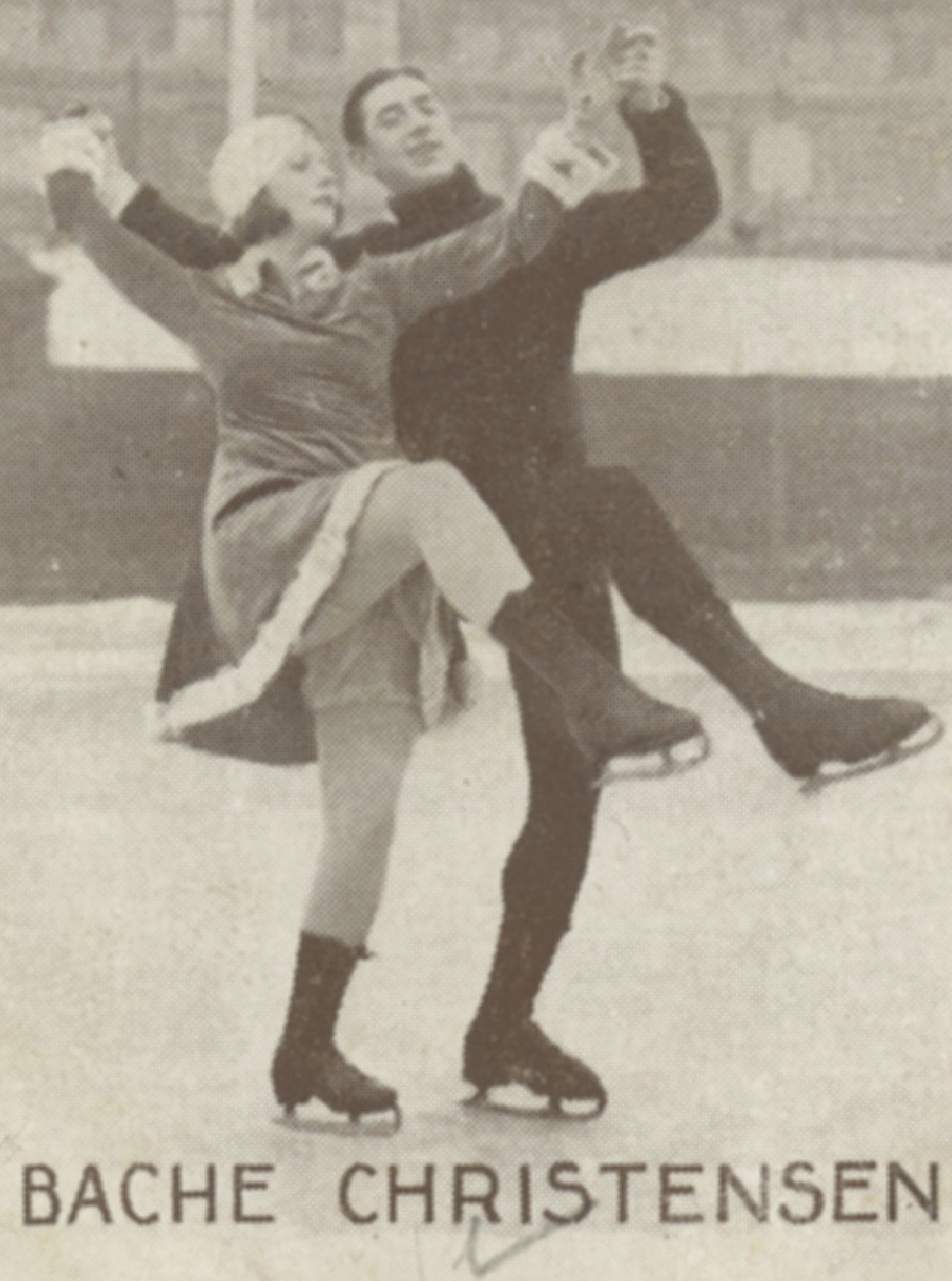
Randi Bakke and Christen Christensen

- 5 September – Anders Lange, politician (died 1974)
- 7 September – Ragnar Steen, musician and band-leader (died 1958)
- 11 September – Olav Totland, politician (died 1996)
- 13 September –
  - Alfhild Hovdan, journalist (died 1982).
  - Sivert Todal, politician (died 1988)
- 16 September – Vebjørn Tandberg, businessperson and industrialist (died 1978)
- 17 September – Christen Christensen, pair skater (died 1969).
- 22 September – Arvid Brodersen, sociologist (died 1996).

=== October ===
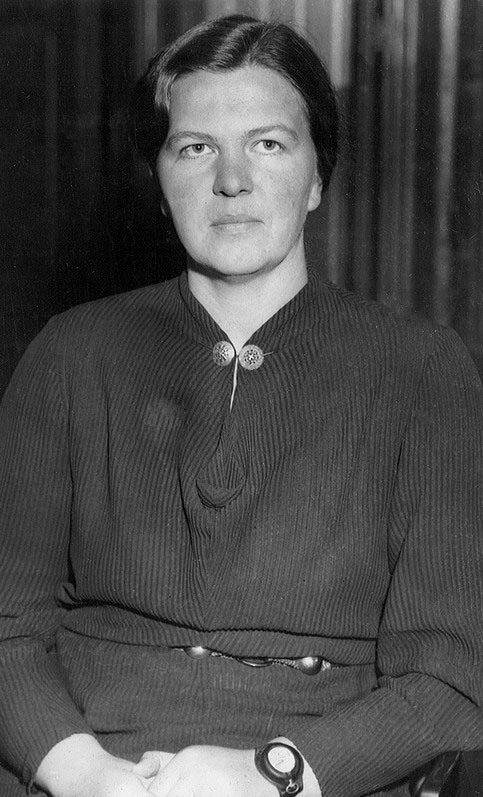
Helga Stene

- 4 October – Petter Carl Reinsnes, politician (died 1976)
- 8 October – Helga Stene, educator (died 1983).
- 15 October – Paul Ingebretsen, politician (died 1968)
- 15 October – Harald L. Tveterås, librarian (died 1991).
- 29 October – Randi Bakke, pair skater (died 1984).

=== November ===
- 19 November – Sven Sømme, zoologist and ichtyologist (died 1961).

=== December ===
- 17 December – Ole Johansen, politician (died 1986)

=== Full date unknown ===
- Sigurd Anderson, nineteenth Governor of South Dakota (died 1990)
- Reidar Kjellberg, art historian (died 1978)
- Paulus Svendsen, historian of literature and ideas (died 1989)
- Eirik Vandvik, professor in literature (died 1953)
- Kolbjørn Varmann, politician and Minister (died 1980)

== Notable deaths ==
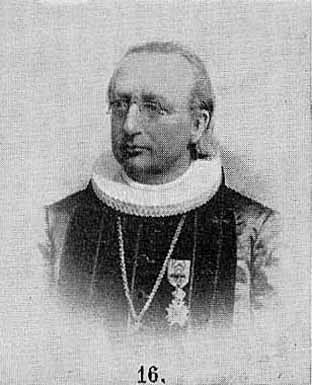
Johan Christian Heuch

- 3 May – Tycho Kielland, jurist and journalist (born 1854)
- 18 August – Sivert Andreas Nielsen, politician (born 1823)
- 6 September – Per Sivle, poet, novelist, newspaper editor (born 1857).
- 13 December – Johannes Skaar, bishop and hymnologist (born 1828).

=== Full date unknown ===
- Jacob Aall Bonnevie, politician and Minister (born 1838)
- Hans Gløersen, forest manager and lawyer (born 1836)
- Johan Christian Heuch, bishop and politician (born 1838)
- Ole Anton Qvam, politician and Minister (born 1834)
