= 1992 in Norway =

- Centuries: 18th; 19th; 20th; 21st
- Decades: 1970s; 1980s; 1990s; 2000s; 2010s
- See also: List of years in Norway

Events in the year 1992 in Norway.

== Incumbents ==
- Monarch – Harald V.
- President of the Storting – Kirsti Kolle Grøndahl (Labour Party)
- Prime Minister – Gro Harlem Brundtland (Labour Party)

== Events ==
- 1 January – The 1992 New Year's Day Storm.

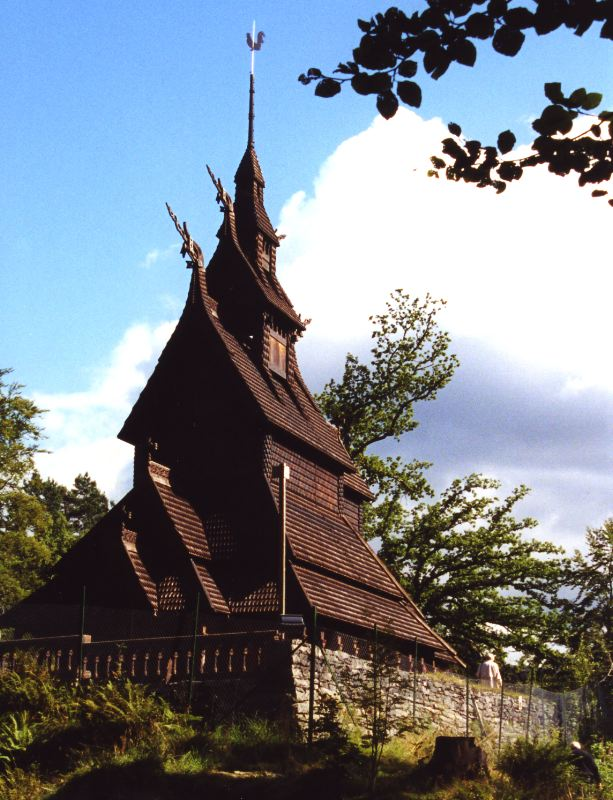
The new reconstructed Fantoft stave church

- 6 June – The Fantoft stave church in Bergen, dating from the 12th century, is burnt to the ground by arsonists originating in the early Norwegian black metal scene.
- 15 July- Michael Jackson continues his European leg of his Dangerous tour, as he performs in a sold-out show at Valle Hovin Stadium in Oslo.
- 20 August – Krifast, a new road system connecting Kristiansund Municipality to the mainland of Norway, opens.
- 5 September – The Norwegian commercial television station TV2 has its first television broadcast.
- 25 November – Norway applies for membership in the European Union.
- 16 December – The current version of the Norwegian coat of arms is approved.

== Popular culture ==
=== Sports ===
- Norway win the European Women's U-17 Handball Championship.
- Rosenborg BK win the 1992 Tippeligaen, starting a historical winning streak that lasted up to and including 2004. Such a winning streak is unprecedented worldwide.
- 9 September – Norway beat San Marino 10–0 at Ullevaal Stadion, starting the 1994 FIFA World Cup qualification campaign where Norway ultimately won Group 2.
- 23 September – Norway upset the Netherlands 2–1 at Ullevaal Stadion to continue the successful campaign.
- 14 October – Norway draw 1–1 with England at Wembley Stadium to continue the successful campaign.

== Notable births ==
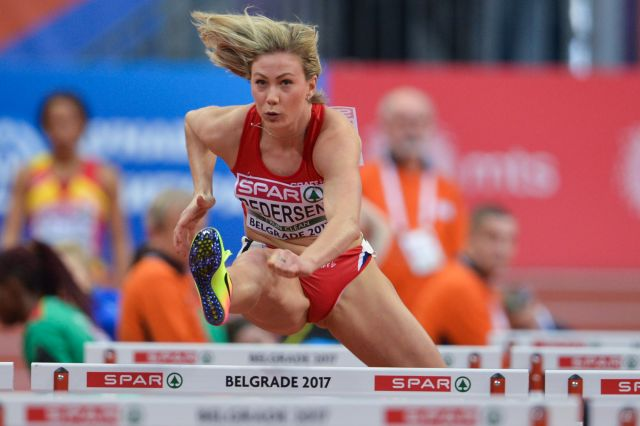
Isabelle Pedersen

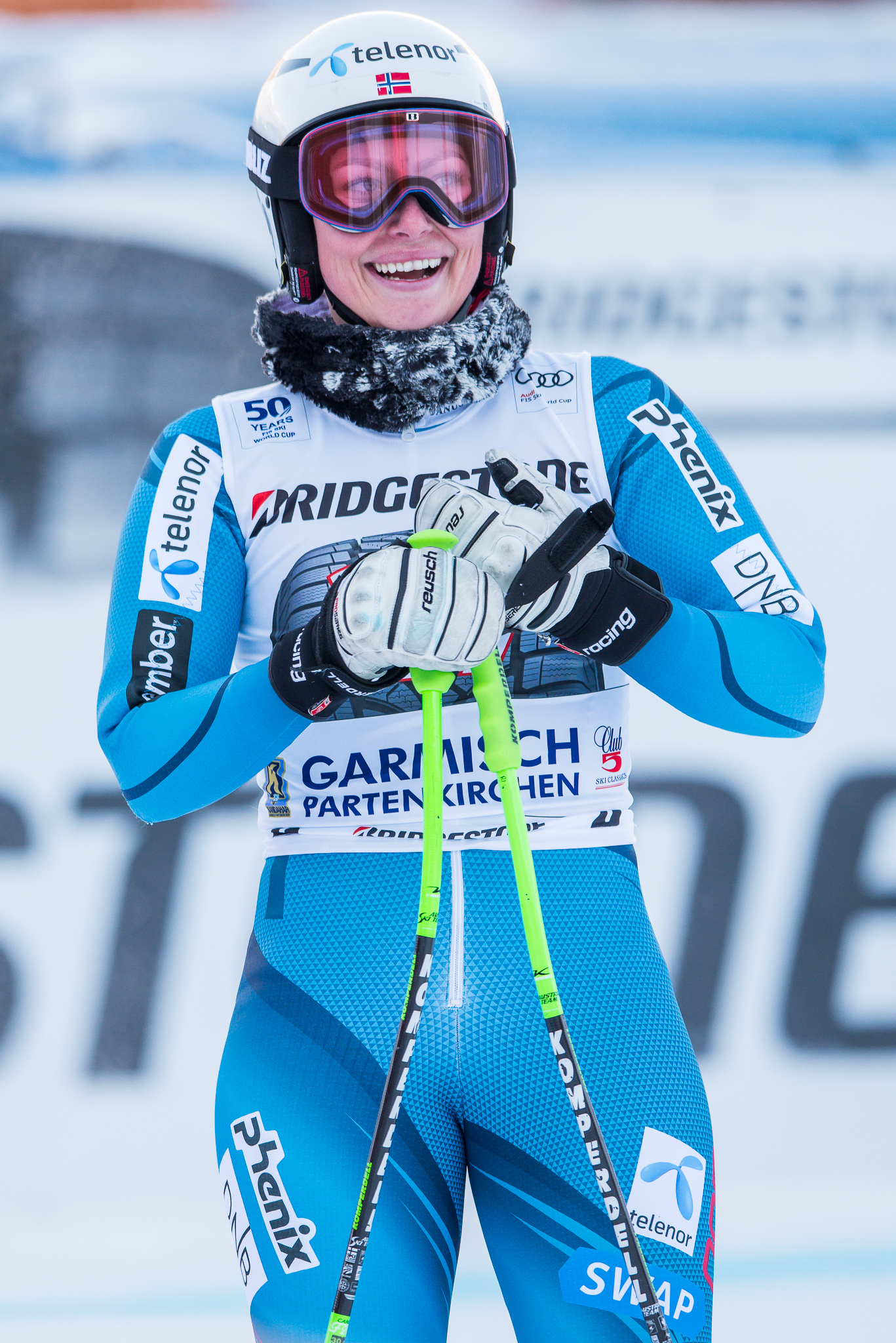
Ragnhild Mowinckel

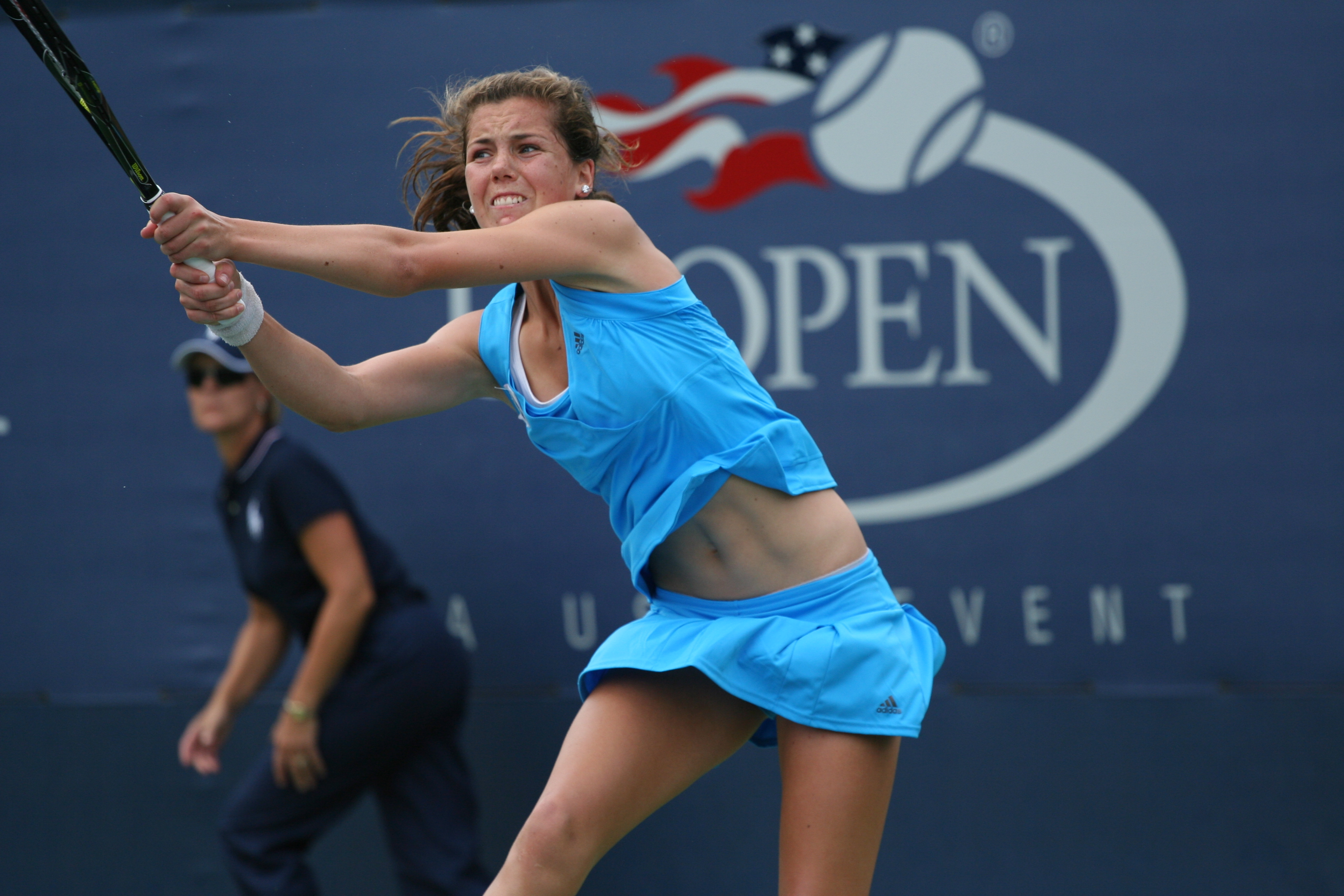
Ulrikke Eikeri

- 2 January – Alexander Hassum, footballer
- 15 January – Joshua King, footballer
- 25 January – Christian Landu Landu, footballer
- 27 January – Isabelle Pedersen, hurdler
- 20 February – Thomas Drage, footballer
- 21 February – Lavrans Solli, swimmer.
- 23 February – Even A. Røed, politician.
- 10 March – Ruben Gabrielsen, footballer
- 23 March – Andreas Bjelland Eriksen, politician.
- 26 March – Petter Øverby, handball player.
- 25 May – Aslak Falch, footballer
- 9 June – Emilie Fleten, cross-country skier.
- 30 June – Fredrik Haugen, footballer
- 17 July – Sverre Lunde Pedersen, speed skater.
- 25 July – Markus Henriksen, footballer
- 8 August – Mushaga Bakenga, footballer
- 9 September
  - Frida Amundsen, singer and songwriter
  - Simon Markeng, footballer
- 10 September – Fredrik Gulbrandsen, footballer
- 12 September – Ragnhild Mowinckel, alpine skier.
- 21 September – Eirik Ulland Andersen, footballer
- 15 December – Mathilde Tybring-Gjedde, politician.
- 16 December – Ulrikke Eikeri, tennis player
- 30 December – Erlend Svardal Bøe, politician.

=== Full date unknown ===
- Sara Nicole Andersen, model and beauty pageant

== Notable deaths ==
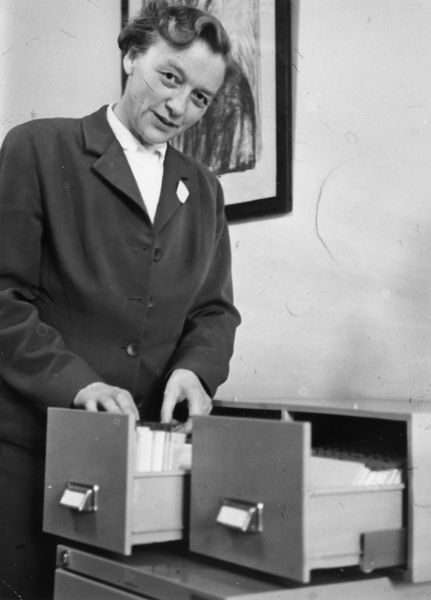
Undis Blikken

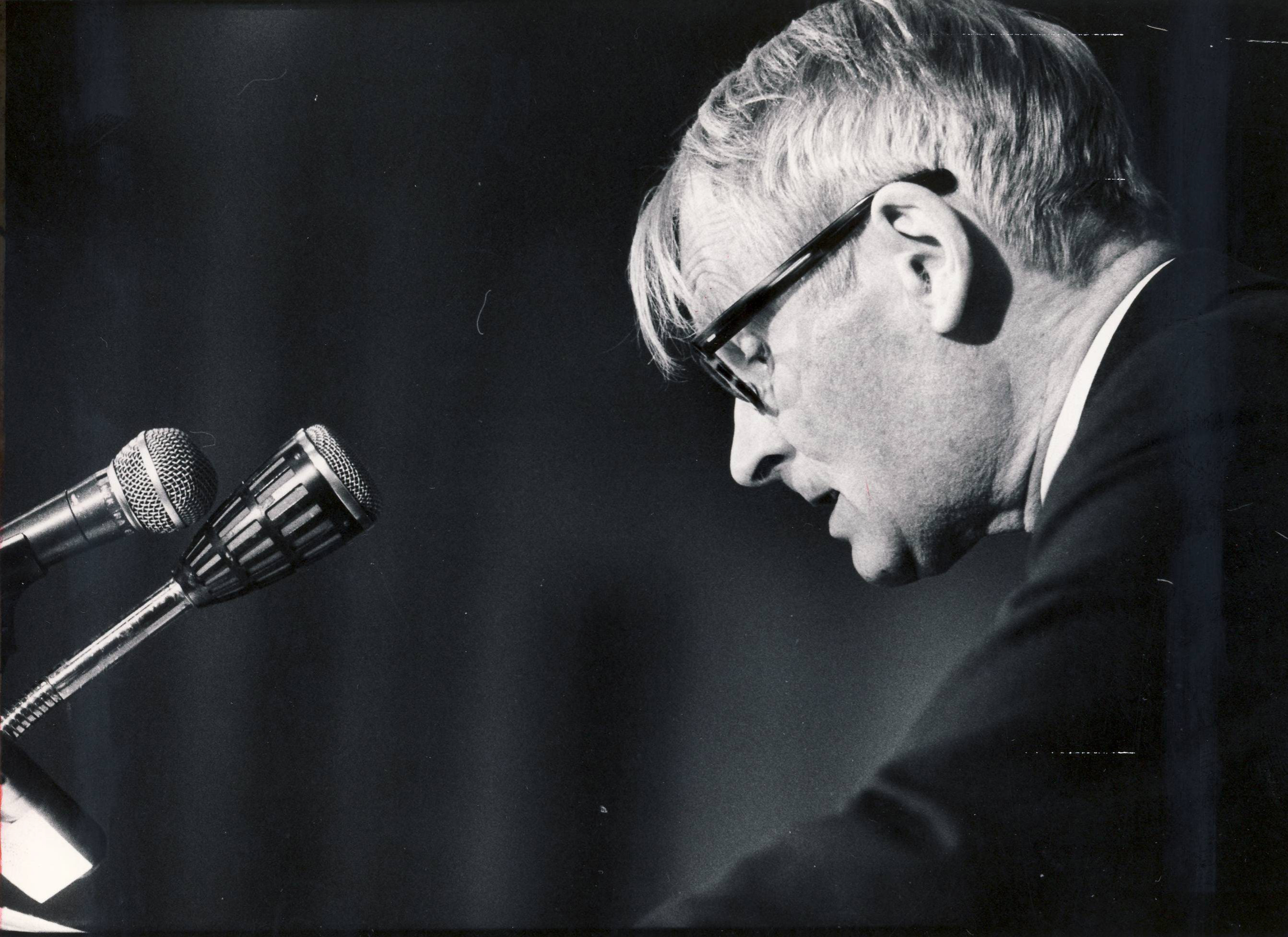
Jens Arup Seip

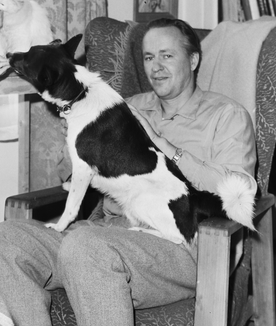
Jens Bolling

- 4 January – Peder Wright Cappelen, book publisher (born 1931).
- 15 January – Bernt Anker Steen, jazz trumpeter (born 1943).
- 20 January – Trond Hegna, journalist and politician (born 1898).
- 22 January – Undis Blikken, speed skater (born 1914).
- 25 January – Reidun Andersson, politician (born 1922)
- 3 February – Ole Aarnæs, high jumper (born 1888)
- 3 February – Agnes Bakkevig, politician (born 1910).
- 7 February – Lauritz Johnson, radio presenter (born 1906).
- 7 February – Gunnar Randers, physicist (born 1914).
- 13 February – Bjørg Abrahamsen, textile artist (born 1931).
- 18 February – Odd Grønvold, Lord Chamberlain(born 1907).
- 19 February – Odd Vattekar, politician (born 1918).
- 22 February – Olav Haukvik, politician (born 1928).
- 23 February – Kristen Eik-Nes, biophysicist (born 1922).
- 25 February – Carl Monssen, rower (born 1921)
- 25 February – Einar Granum, painter and teacher (born 1920).
- 17 March – Gøril Havrevold, actress (born 1914).
- 27 March – Harald Sæverud, composer (born 1897).
- 28 March – Elisabeth Granneman, singer (born 1930).
- 29 March – Øistein Hermansen, politician (born 1919).
- 6 April – Erling Wikborg, politician (born 1894).
- 13 April – Gunnar Haarstad, police chief (born 1916).
- 15 April – Hans Bernhard Haneberg, politician (born 1918).
- 22 April – Gunnar Jakobsen, politician (born 1916)
- 3 May – Einar Stavang, politician (born 1898).
- 3 May – Thor Hjorth-Jenssen, actor (born 1923).
- 4 May – Kjellfrid Kjær Smemo, politician (born 1911).
- 10 May – Egil Endresen, jurist and politician (born 1920).
- 10 May – Werner Nilsen, footballer(born 1904)
- 14 May – Inga Lovise Tusvik, politician (born 1914).
- 15 May – Ola Johan Gjengedal, politician (born 1900).
- 23 May – Olav Eriksen, opera singer (born 1927).
- 7 June – Olav Rytter, writer and radio personality (born 1903).
- 9 June – Per Bergsland, RAF pilot (born 1919)
- 15 June – Nils Mugaas, civil servant (born 1921).
- 20 June – Per Oftedal, geneticist (born 1919).
- 23 June – Axel Coldevin, historian (born 1900).
- 26 June – Harald Sverdrup, poet and children's writer (born 1923).
- 26 June – Willy Kristoffer Svarverud, politician (born 1927).
- 29 June – Egil Solin Ranheim, politician (born 1923).
- 4 July – Bobben Hagerup, jazz drummer (born 1911).
- 11 July – Ulf Thoresen, harness racer (born 1946).
- 3 August – Finn Ludt, pianist, composer and music critic (born 1918).
- 3 August – Johannes Olai Holm, politician (born 1906).
- 5 August – Bernt Bjørkø, painter and sculptor (born 1917).
- 11 August – Sigmund Juul Hermann Halvorsrud, politician (born 1915).
- 14 August – Holger Albrechtsen, hurdler (born 1906).
- 19 August – Berge Helle Kringlebotn, politician (born 1904).
- 19 August – Carsten Winger, actor (born 1907).
- 20 August – Ulf Hafsten, botanist (born 1922).
- 26 August – Olav Aase, politician (born 1914).
- 29 August – Erling Petersen, economist and politician (born 1906).
- 3 September – Ragnhild Butenschøn, sculptor (born 1912).
- 5 September – Jens Arup Seip, historian (born 1905).
- 17 September – Sigurd Røen, Nordic combined skier (born 1909).
- 24 September – Paul Lorck Eidem, writer and illustrator (born 1909).
- 27 September – Erik Rolfsen, architect (born 1905).
- 5 October – Harald Haraldssøn, resistance member (born 1898).
- 7 October – Julian Strøm, puppeteer (born 1901).
- 11 October – Gotfred Ernø, businessperson (born 1902).
- 16 October – Torbjørn Mork, physician and civil servant (born 1928).
- 21 October – Lillemor Aars, ceramicist (born 1904).
- 27 October – Odd Brochmann, architect (born 1909).
- 1 November – Pål Sundvor, writer (born 1920).
- 4 November – Henrik Finne, painter and sculptor (born 1898).
- 8 November – Petter Olav Johnsen Liland, politician (born 1902).
- 15 November – Klaus Gjøstein, painter (born 1905).
- 17 November – Egil Peter Harvold, orthodontist (born 1912).
- 25 November – Aslak Versto, politician (born 1924).
- 25 November – Skule Storheill, naval officer (born 1907).
- 26 November – Annie Skau Berntsen, missionary (born 1911).
- 1 December – Arthur Meier Karlsen, politician (born 1906).
- 1 December – Magne Bleness, theatre instructor (born 1933).
- 8 December – Frithjof Prydz, ski jumper and tennis player (born 1943).
- 13 December – Jens Bolling, actor and theatre director (born 1915).
- 14 December – Bjarne Gran, historian and radio presenter (born 1918).
- 28 December – Nils Handal, politician (born 1906).
