= Johannes Kringlebotn =

Norwegian newspaper editor and politician (1898–1959)

Johannes Kringlebotn (3 July 1898 – 1959) was a Norwegian newspaper editor. He edited Folketanken and, during the Nazi era in Norway, Stavanger Aftenblad. After serving a treason sentence he returned in the 1950s to edit the historical revisionist newspaper Folk og Land. He was involved in politics and organizational life in the interwar period, and was also among Norway's top-ten middle distance runners.

== Early life and career ==
He was born in Bergen, but grew up in Østfold and Aust-Agder. His father was the manager of Holt Agricultural School. He was a brother of politician Berge Helle Kringlebotn. He was a member of Noregs Ungdomslag and Noregs Mållag during his younger days, and also competed for the sports club IL i BUL. In 1923 he was registered as among the top ten in two middle distance events; he was the ninth fastest Norwegian in the 800 metres (2:05.6 minutes at Dælenenga in August; the fastest Norwegian was later Nazi Charles Hoff) and the seventh fastest Norwegian in the 1500 metres (4:18.5 minutes at Dælenenga in June). He started his journalistic career in local newspapers as well as Den 17de Mai and Morgenbladet. He edited the Risør newspaper Folketanken from 1923, succeeding Andreas Hansson.

== Second World War and beyond ==
When the occupation of Norway by Nazi Germany started, he turned Folketanken into a Nazi newspaper, and in 1941 he was hired as editor of Stavanger Aftenblad as it was usurped by Nazis and Sven Oftedal was fired. He was editor from 18 April 1941 to 27 June 1942.

He lost his position at the war's end. During the legal purge in Norway after World War II he was tried in court for being a Nasjonal Samling member from September 1940, being the local party leader in Risør from October 1940, being acting mayor in Risør from January to April 1941, being a Hird member and holding several pro-Nazi speeches all over Norway between 1940 and 1942. He was also tried for several actions as editor of Stavanger Aftenblad, among others the denouncing of salesman Josef Kvavik and illustrator Henry Imsland. (Note: Imsland was supposedly imprisoned as a result of this, but he is not included in Ottosen, Kristian, ed. (2004). Nordmenn i fangenskap 1940–1945 (in Norwegian) (2nd ed.). Oslo: Universitetsforlaget. ISBN 82-15-00288-9.) The prosecutor wanted eight years of forced labour and confiscation of money, but in the Gulating Court of Appeal in August 1946 he was sentenced for treason to four years of forced labour. None of his money was confiscated. He was acquitted for several of the trial points.

In 1952 he became editor-in-chief of the historical revisionist newspaper Folk og Land. He remained editor up to and including 1957, and was succeeded by former Fritt Folk editor and Nazi Odd Erling Melsom. Kringlebotn died in 1959.
