= Kringlebotn =

Kringlebotn is a Norwegian surname. Notable people with the surname include:

- Berge Helle Kringlebotn (1904–1992), Norwegian politician
- Johannes Kringlebotn (1898–1959), Norwegian newspaper editor
- Solveig Kringlebotn (born 1963), Norwegian operatic soprano
