= Brodersen =

Brodersen is a surname. Notable people with the surname include:

- Arvid Brodersen (1904–1996), Norwegian sociologist
- Friedrich Brodersen (1873–1926), German opera singer
- Kai Brodersen (born 1958), German historian and classical scholar
- Robert W. Brodersen (born 1945), American electrical engineer
- Viggo Brodersen (1879–1965), Danish classical composer and pianist

== See also ==
- 17965 Brodersen, a main-belt asteroid
