= Gjøstein =

Gjøstein is a Norwegian surname. Notable people with the surname include:

- Johan Gjøstein (1866–1935), Norwegian educator, newspaper editor and politician
- Klaus Gjøstein (1905–1992), Norwegian painter

== See also ==
- Ingerid Gjøstein Resi
- Kjell Gjøstein Aabrek
