= 1930 Norwegian parliamentary election =

- 20 October 1930

All 150 seats in the Storting 76 seats needed for a majority
- Turnout: 77.5%
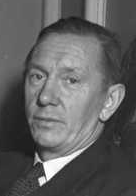

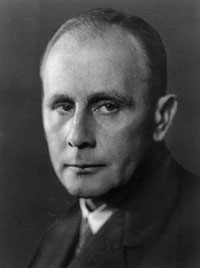

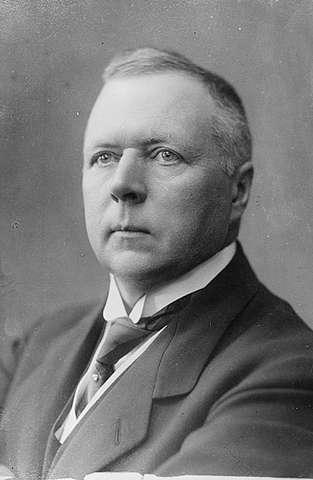

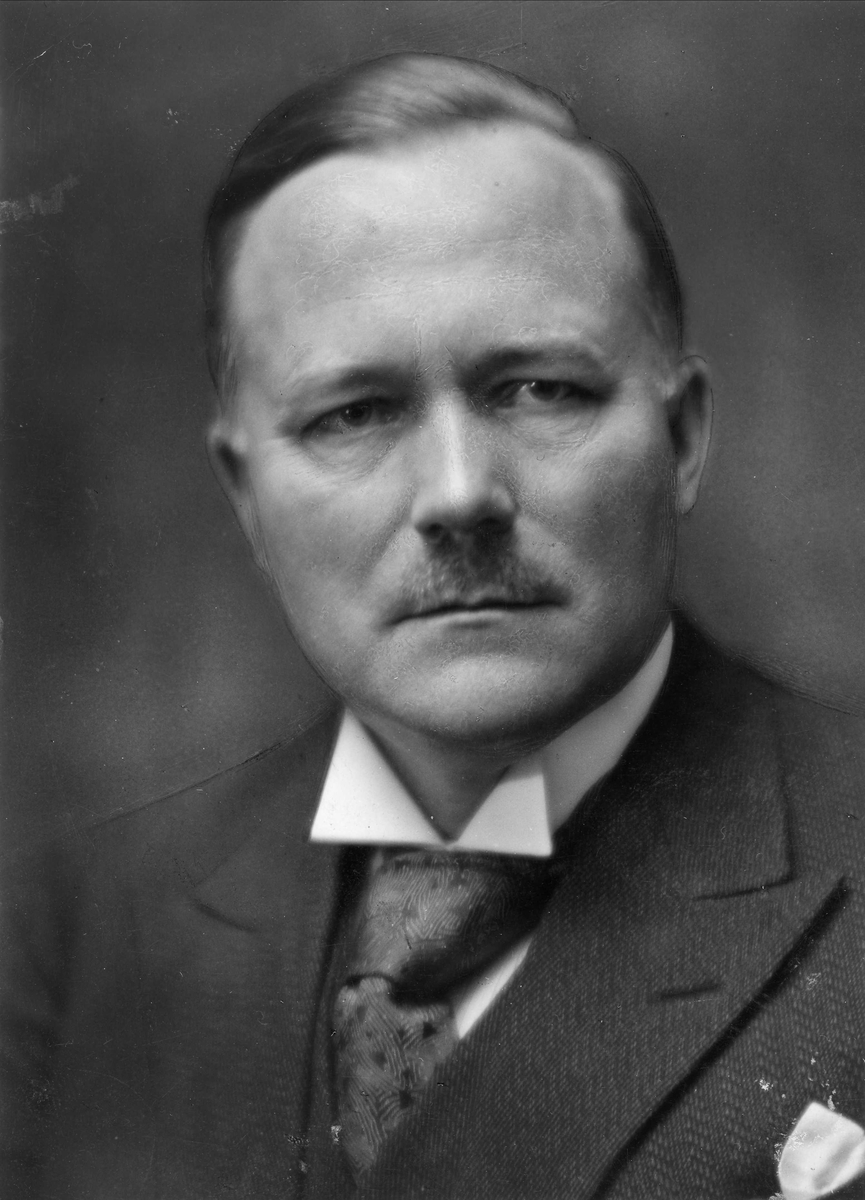

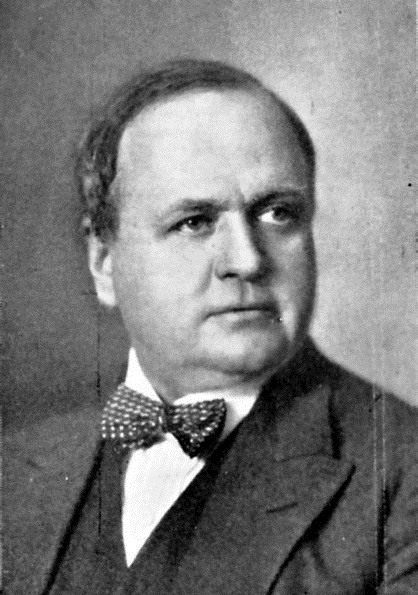

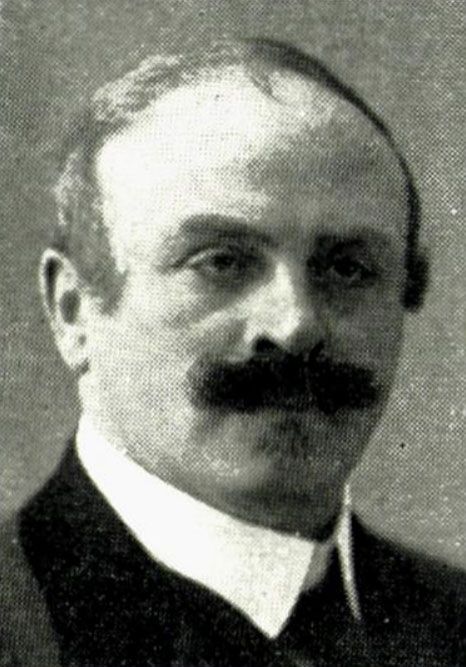
| | First party | Second party | Third party |
|---|---|---|---|
| Leader | Oscar Torp | C. J. Hambro | Johan Ludwig Mowinckel |
| Party | Labour | Conservative | Liberal |
| Last election | 36.8%, 59 seats | 24.0%, 29 seats | 17.3%, 30 seats |
| Seats won | 47 | 39 | 33 |
| Seat change | ▼12 | ▲10 | ▲3 |
| Popular vote | 374,854 | 327,731 (H+FV) | 241,355 |
| Percentage | 31.4% | 27.4% (H+FV) | 20.2% |
| | Fourth party | Fifth party | Sixth party |
| Leader | Jens Hundseid | Anton Wilhelm Brøgger | Alf Mjøen |
| Party | Farmers' | Free-minded Liberal | Radical People's |
| Last election | 14.9%, 26 seats | 1.3%, 2 seats with H | 1.3%, 1 seat |
| Seats won | 25 | 5 | 1 |
| Seat change | ▼1 | ▲3 | Steady |
| Popular vote | 190,220 | 31,003/All. with H | 9,228 |
| Percentage | 15.9% | 2.6%/— | 0.8% |
Prime Minister before election
Johan Ludwig Mowinckel
Liberal
Prime Minister after election
Johan Ludwig Mowinckel
Liberal

Parliamentary elections were held in Norway on 20 October 1930. The Labour Party won the most seats (47 of the 150 seats) in the Storting.

During the election, the Labour Party advocated for socialist policies whereas the Conservative, Liberal and Agrarian parties ran in opposition to the Labour Party.

== Endorsements ==
=== National daily newspapers ===
| Newspaper | Party endorsed |
|---|---|
| Finnmarksposten | Conservative Party |
| Finnmarksposten | Free-minded Liberal Party |
| Vestfinnmark Arbeiderblad | Labour Party |
| Folketanken | Liberal Party |
| Østerdal Arbeiderblad | Labour Party |
| Folkeviljen | Labour Party |

== Results ==
| Party | Votes | % | Seats | +/– |
|---|---|---|---|---|
| Labour Party | 374,854 | 31.37 | 47 | –12 |
| Conservative Party (Note: The Conservative Party and the Free-minded Liberal Party continued their alliance, but in some constituencies the Free-minded Liberal Party ran separate lists.) | 327,731 | 27.43 | 39 | +10 |
| Free-minded Liberal Party | 327,731 | 27.43 | 2 | +1 |
| Liberal Party | 241,355 | 20.20 | 33 | +3 |
| Farmers' Party | 190,220 | 15.92 | 25 | –1 |
| Free-minded Liberal Party | 31,003 | 2.59 | 3 | +2 |
| Communist Party | 20,351 | 1.70 | 0 | –3 |
| Radical People's Party | 9,228 | 0.77 | 1 | 0 |
| Wild votes | 13 | 0.00 | – | – |
| Total | 1,194,755 | 100.00 | 150 | 0 |
| Valid votes | 1,194,755 | 99.39 | | |
| Invalid/blank votes | 7,346 | 0.61 | | |
| Total votes | 1,202,101 | 100.00 | | |
| Registered voters/turnout | 1,550,077 | 77.55 | | |
Source: Nohlen & Stöver

=== Seat distribution ===
| Constituency | Total seats | Seats won | | | | |
| Constituency | Total seats | Ap | H–FV | V | B | RF |
|---|---|---|---|---|---|---|
| Akershus | 7 | 3 | 3 | | 1 | |
| Aust-Agder | 4 | 1 | 1 | 1 | 1 | |
| Bergen | 5 | 2 | 2 | 1 | | |
| Buskerud | 5 | 2 | 1 | | 1 | |
| Finnmark | 3 | 1 | 1 | 1 | | |
| Hedmark | 7 | 4 | 1 | | 2 | |
| Hordaland | 8 | 1 | 1 | 4 | 2 | |
| Market towns of Akershus and Østfold | 4 | 2 | 2 | | | |
| Market towns of Buskerud | 3 | 1 | 2 | 1 | | |
| Market towns of Hedmark and Oppland | 3 | 1 | 2 | | | |
| Market towns of Møre | 3 | 1 | | 1 | | |
| Market towns of Nordland, Troms and Finnmark | 4 | 2 | 1 | 1 | | |
| Market towns of Sør-Trøndelag and Nord-Trøndelag | 5 | 1 | 4 | | | |
| Market towns of Telemark and Aust-Agder | 5 | 2 | 2 | 1 | | |
| Market towns of Vest-Agder and Rogaland | 7 | 2 | 2 | 3 | | |
| Market towns of Vestfold | 4 | 1 | 3 | | | |
| Møre | 7 | 1 | 1 | 4 | 2 | |
| Nord-Trøndelag | 5 | 2 | | 1 | 2 | |
| Nordland | 8 | 2 | 3 | 2 | 1 | |
| Oppland | 6 | 2 | | | 3 | 1 |
| Oslo | 7 | 3 | 4 | | | |
| Østfold | 6 | 3 | 1 | | 2 | |
| Rogaland | 5 | | 1 | 2 | 2 | |
| Sogn og Fjordane | 5 | | 1 | 2 | 2 | |
| Sør-Trøndelag | 6 | 2 | 1 | 2 | 1 | |
| Telemark | 5 | 2 | | 2 | 1 | |
| Troms | 5 | 2 | 1 | 1 | 1 | |
| Vest-Agder | 4 | | 1 | 2 | 1 | |
| Vestfold | 4 | 1 | 2 | 1 | | |
| Total | 150 | 47 | 44 | 33 | 25 | 1 |
Source: Norges Offisielle Statistikk
