= Folk og Land =

Norwegian newspaper

- Founded: 1952
- Ceased publication: 2003
- Language: Norwegian
- Headquarters: Oslo
- Country: Norway

Folk og Land (lit. 'People and Country') was a Norwegian newspaper, published in Oslo. It was an organ of historical negationism for Norwegians who were found to be Nazi collaborators during the Second World War.

== History ==
Folk og Land had its predecessor in Skolenytt, stenciled and published by the Kristiansund-based former teacher Nils Vikdal from 1947. His agenda was to spread news to former members of Lærersambandet, a trade union for teachers set up by the Quisling regime during the occupation of Norway by Nazi Germany (1940–1945). It was stenciled until the summer of 1948, when printing began. The name was also changed to 8. Mai, named after the day the occupation ended.

Folk og Land was formally started on 6 December 1952, edited by Finn Brun Knudsen. It had an informal affiliation to the organization Forbundet for Sosial Oppreisning (FSO, later renamed Institutt for Norsk Okkupasjonshistorie), made up by former collaborators who were critical to the legal purge in Norway after World War II and the victors' version of history. FSO chairman Anders Hafskjold was among the early shareholders in Folk og Land. From 1958 the newspaper was officially a co-operative with Forbundet for Sosial Oppreisning as owners. At the same time, the last editor of the now-forbidden Nasjonal Samling newspaper Fritt Folk, Odd Erling Melsom, was hired as editor-in-chief, a position he held until 1978. He succeeded Johannes Kringlebotn. Post-1978 editors include Alexander Lange and Kjell Blich Schreiner.

The newspaper makers claimed that their circulation was six of seven thousand in the 1960s; this is a dubious figure. Some hundred copies were also distributed for free to politicians and the press all over Norway. The goals of the newspaper makers were to gain acceptance for their version of history, as well as to gain legal reparations from the Parliament of Norway (in which they have failed). They meant that aggressors other than Germany caused the Second World War, that the Allies caused most harm during the war, and that once Germany had occupied Norway, collaborators (including Quisling) did the right thing in that they represented a Norwegian rule over the country instead of letting Germans take over.

In its last years of existence, Folk og Land was published monthly. The last issue came on 27 April 2003.

== Impact ==
Hans Fredrik Dahl has stated that "in several cases, the historical revisionism of the magazine has proven worthwhile". In Egil Ulateig's 1996 book Med rett til å drepe, where Hans Fredrik Dahl was a historical consultant, the newspaper was used extensively as a source text. Specifically, Ulateig used a series of articles printed under the title Okkupasjonstidens likvidasjoner, between 7 November 1970 and 25 November 1972. Ulateig's book contained 136 people which allegedly had been liquidated by the Norwegian resistance movement, many cases taken verbatim from Folk og Land. In a thorough critique, Arnfinn Moland found that 63 of them were correct, most of the rest were nonsense taken from Folk og Land. The newspaper series, said Moland, looked like it was written by a "more or less imbalanced" person.
