= Presseabteilung =

The Press Department (German: Presseabteilung) was a subdepartment of the Reich Ministry of Public Enlightenment and Propaganda created shortly after the German occupation of Norway in April 1940. Through the department, Germans controlled the content of Norwegian newspapers. The work was based on political control of the press, meaning direct interference, closing, firing of editors and journalists, and even arrests.

Both the Norwegian fascist party Nasjonal Samling and the Norwegian Ministry of Culture and Enlightenment wanted to control newspapers. The NS-controlled Press Directorate was also involved in directing Norwegian newspaper content, resulting in parallel systems for any publishing in the country, but the German occupants used the press department to get the final power of decision. The department consisted of bureaus for general press policy, daily newspapers, illustrated press, culture and economy journalism, news and information.

Oslo papers that were being published got the messages of what to print through the daily press conferences, other papers got classified daily orders by telephone or teleprinter, the latter an innovation brought to Norwegian newspapers by the Germans. Orders went into detail about how the occupant power wanted each piece of news handled, as well as what events were not to be covered at all. NS papers were also established. The largest and best known was Fritt Folk ("Free People"), which took over the offices of Arbeiderbladet after this Oslo paper was closed down in August 1940.

Several papers that refused to follow guidelines were shut down for longer or shorter periods. Some were made subject to prior restraint rather than the normal censorship after the fact. However, perhaps the most effective sanction was paper rationing. Using paper rationing as an excuse, the department managed to reduce the number of publications, which made its censorship work easier. Towns that had more than one newspaper before the war were usually left with one.
