= 1933 World Figure Skating Championships =

Annual figure skating competition held in 1933

- Type: ISU Championship
- Date: February 18–19 (men); February 11–12 (ladies and pairs)
- Season: 1933
- Location: Zurich, Switzerland (men); Stockholm, Sweden (ladies and pairs)

Champions
- Men's singles: (Austria) Karl Schäfer
- Ladies' singles: (Norway) Sonja Henie
- Pairs: (Kingdom of Hungary) Emília Rotter / László Szollás
- Previous: 1932 World Championships
- Next: 1934 World Championships

The World Figure Skating Championships is an annual figure skating competition sanctioned by the International Skating Union in which figure skaters compete for the title of World Champion.

Men's competitions took from place February 18 to 19 in Zurich, Switzerland. Ladies' and pairs' competitions took place from February 11 to 12 in Stockholm, Sweden.

== Medal table ==
* Host nations (Switzerland, Sweden)

Rank	Nation	Gold	Silver	Bronze	Total
1	Austria	1	1	1	3
2	Norway	1	0	1	2
3	Hungary	1	0	0	1
4	Germany	0	1	0	1
4	Sweden*	0	1	0	1
6	Finland	0	0	1	1
Totals (6 entries)		3	3	3	9

== Results ==
=== Men ===
Rank	Name	Places
1	(Austria) Karl Schäfer	7
2	(Germany) Ernst Baier	11
3	(Finland) Markus Nikkanen	17
4	(Austria) Erich Erdös	17
5	(Germany) Herbert Haertel	28
6	(Austria) Eduard Scholdan	28
7	(Czechoslovakia) Rudolf Praznovsky	38
8	(Switzerland) Erwin Keller	41
9	(France) Jean Henrion	46
10	(Switzerland) Othmar Jordi	46

Judges:

- (Germany) Kurt Dannenberg
- (Austria) Hans Günauer
- (United Kingdom) H. Martineau
- (France) Charles Sabouret
- (Switzerland) A. Steinmann

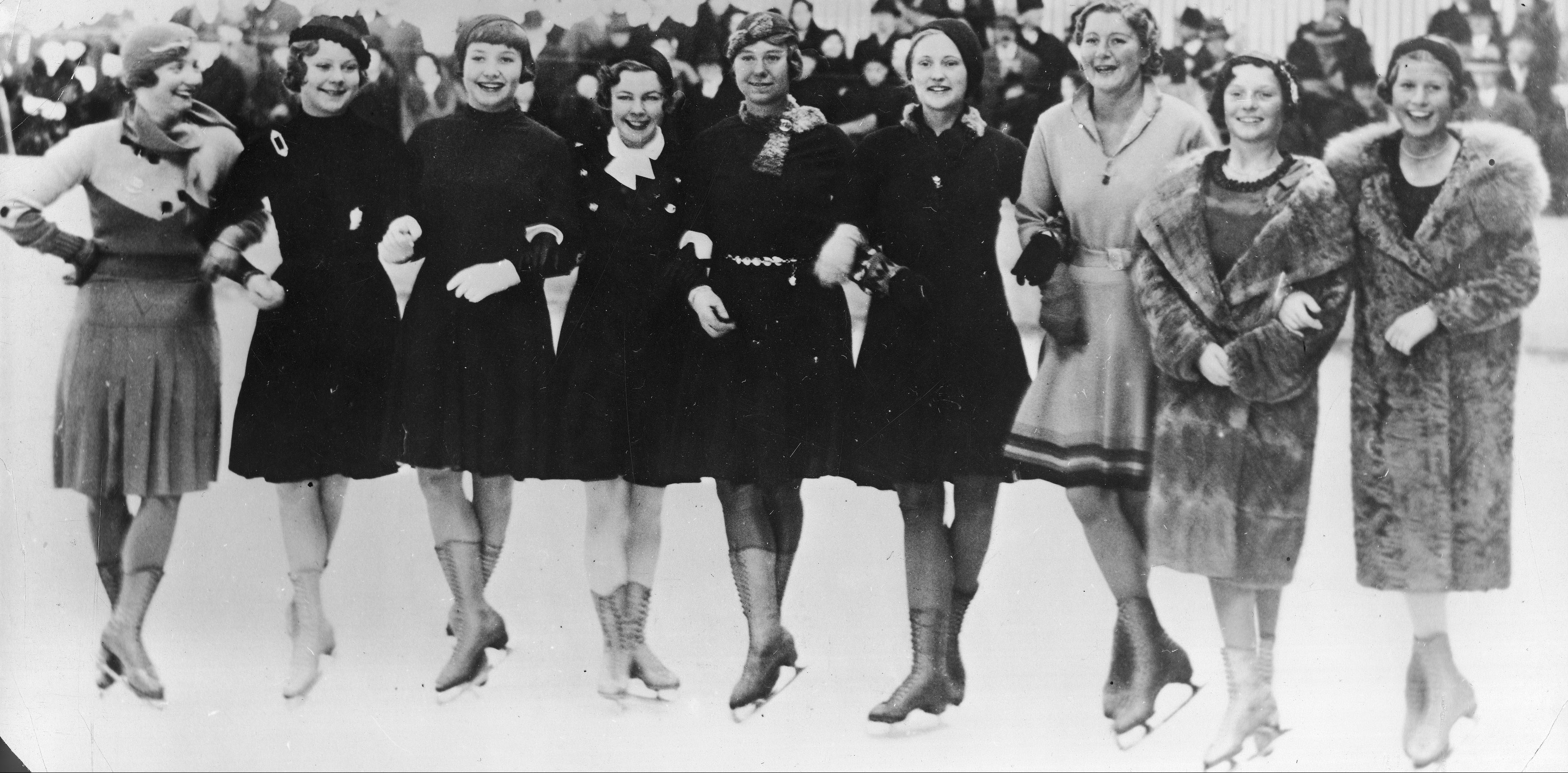
The women competitors

=== Ladies ===
Rank	Name	Places
1	(Norway) Sonja Henie	5
2	(Sweden) Vivi-Anne Hultén	14
3	(Austria) Hilde Holovsky	15
4	(United Kingdom) Megan Taylor	18
5	(United Kingdom) Cecilia Colledge	24
6	(Austria) Liselotte Landbeck	31
7	(Norway) Nanna Egedius	37
8	(Belgium) Yvonne de Ligne-Geurts	38
9	(Norway) Erna Andersen	43

Judges:

- (Sweden) August Anderberg
- (Austria) Otto Bohatsch
- (Norway) B. Børjeson
- (Finland) Walter Jakobsson
- (United Kingdom) C. L. Wilson

=== Pairs ===
Rank	Name	Places
1	(Kingdom of Hungary) Emília Rotter / László Szollás	7
2	(Austria) Idi Papez / Karl Zwack	8
3	(Norway) Randi Bakke / Christen Christensen	18
4	(Sweden) Anna-Lisa Rydqvist / Einar Törsleff	21
5	(Sweden) Dagmar von Kothen / Fred Ericson	21

Judges:

- (Austria) Otto Bohatsch
- (Norway) B. Børjeson
- (United Kingdom) Herbert Clarke
- (Sweden) Tore Monthander
- (Kingdom of Hungary) Andor Szende
