= Helga Stene =

Norwegian educator (1904–1983)

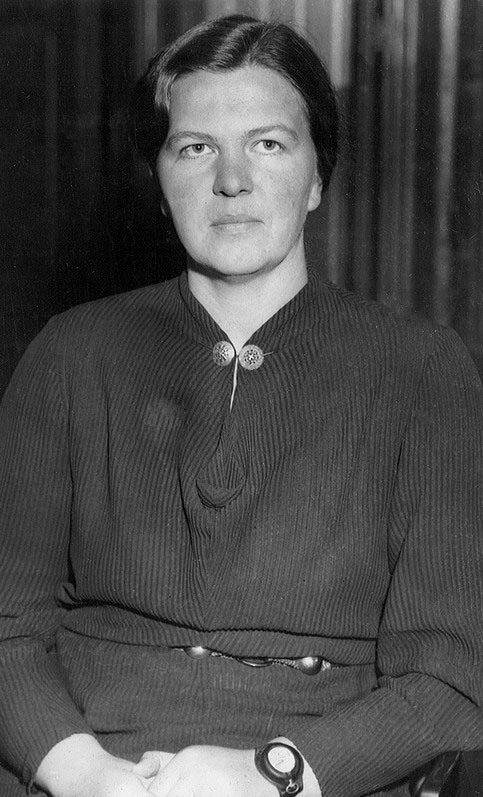
- Born: 8 October 1904; Notodden, Norway
- Died: 2 October 1983 (aged 78)
- Occupation: educator
- Awards: Order of St. Olav

Helga Stene (8 October 1904 – 2 October 1983) was a Norwegian educator, feminist and resistance member. She was born in Notodden, and was a sister of Aasta Stene. She graduated from the University of Oslo in 1932. She lectured a few years at universities in Berlin and in Sweden. From 1937 to 1966 she was assigned to various secondary schools in Oslo, as teacher and administrator. During the occupation of Norway by Nazi Germany she played a leading role in the parents' resistance, including massive protests against new laws for regulating children's life. She was decorated Knight, First Class of the Order of St. Olav in 1977.
