= Randi Bakke =

Norwegian figure skater (1904–1984)

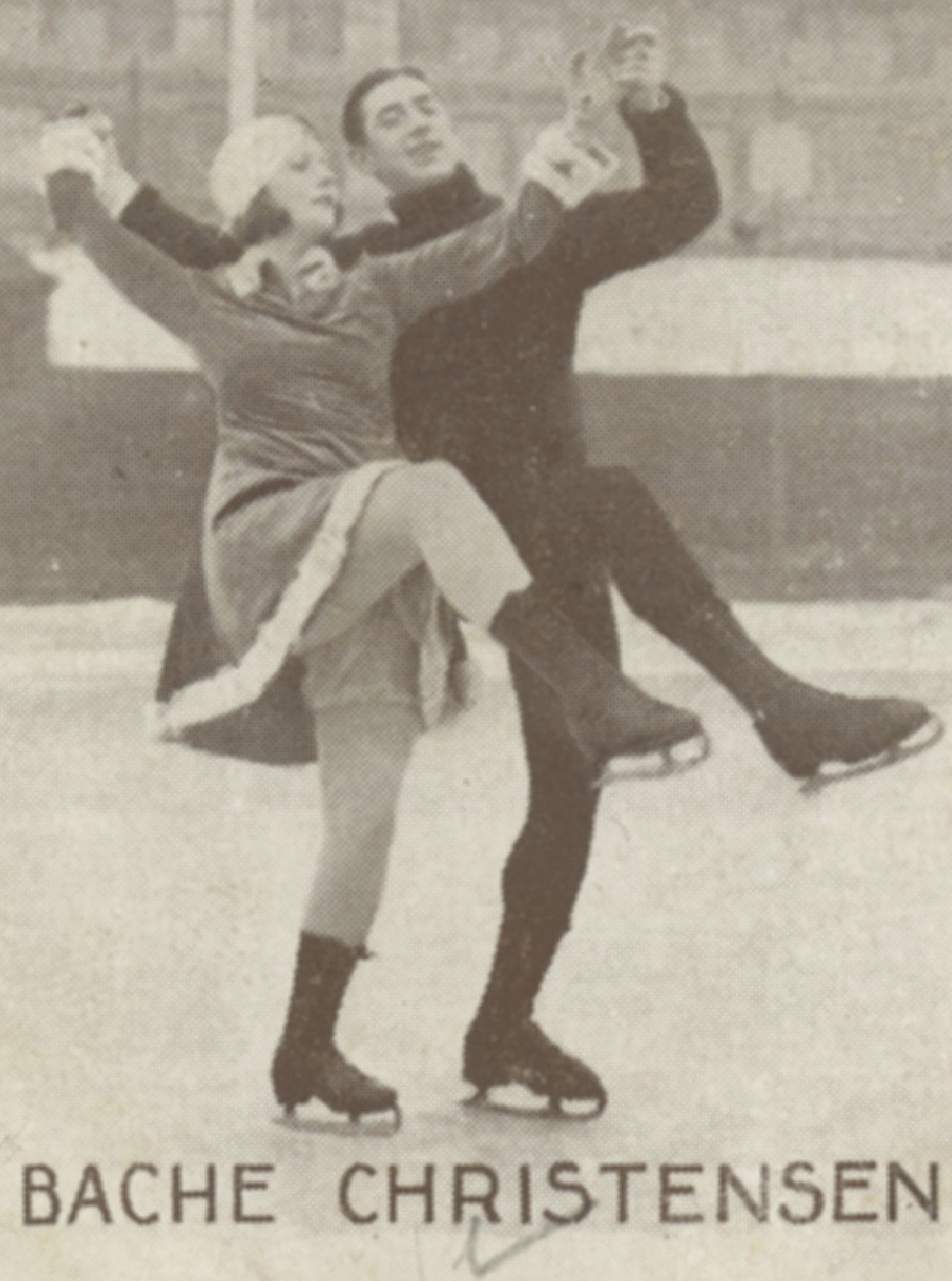
- Bakke (left) and Christen Christensen (right)

Personal information
- Full name: Randi Nilsine Bakke
- Born: 29 October 1904 Oslo
- Died: 21 May 1984 (aged 79) Nesodden

Figure skating career
- Country: Norway
- Partner: Christen Christensen
- Skating club: Oslo Skøiteklub
Medal record
Representing Norway
Pairs Figure skating
World Championships
Bronze medal – third place	1933 Stockholm	Pairs

Randi Nilsine Bakke (married name: Gjertsen; 29 October 1904, in Oslo – 21 May 1984, in Nesodden) was a Norwegian pair skater. She represented Oslo Skøiteklub.

Her pairs partner was Christen Christensen. They are the 1933 World bronze medalists. They finished fifth at the 1923 World Figure Skating Championships and the 1934 World Figure Skating Championships. They represented Norway at the 1936 Winter Olympics, where they placed 15th.

== Results ==
with Christen Christensen

Event	1923	1929	1930	1931	1932	1933	1934	1935	1936
Winter Olympic Games									15th
World Championships	5th					3rd	5th		
Norwegian Championships		1st	1st	1st	1st	1st	1st	1st	1st
