= Folketanken =

Norwegian newspaper, 1888 to 1945

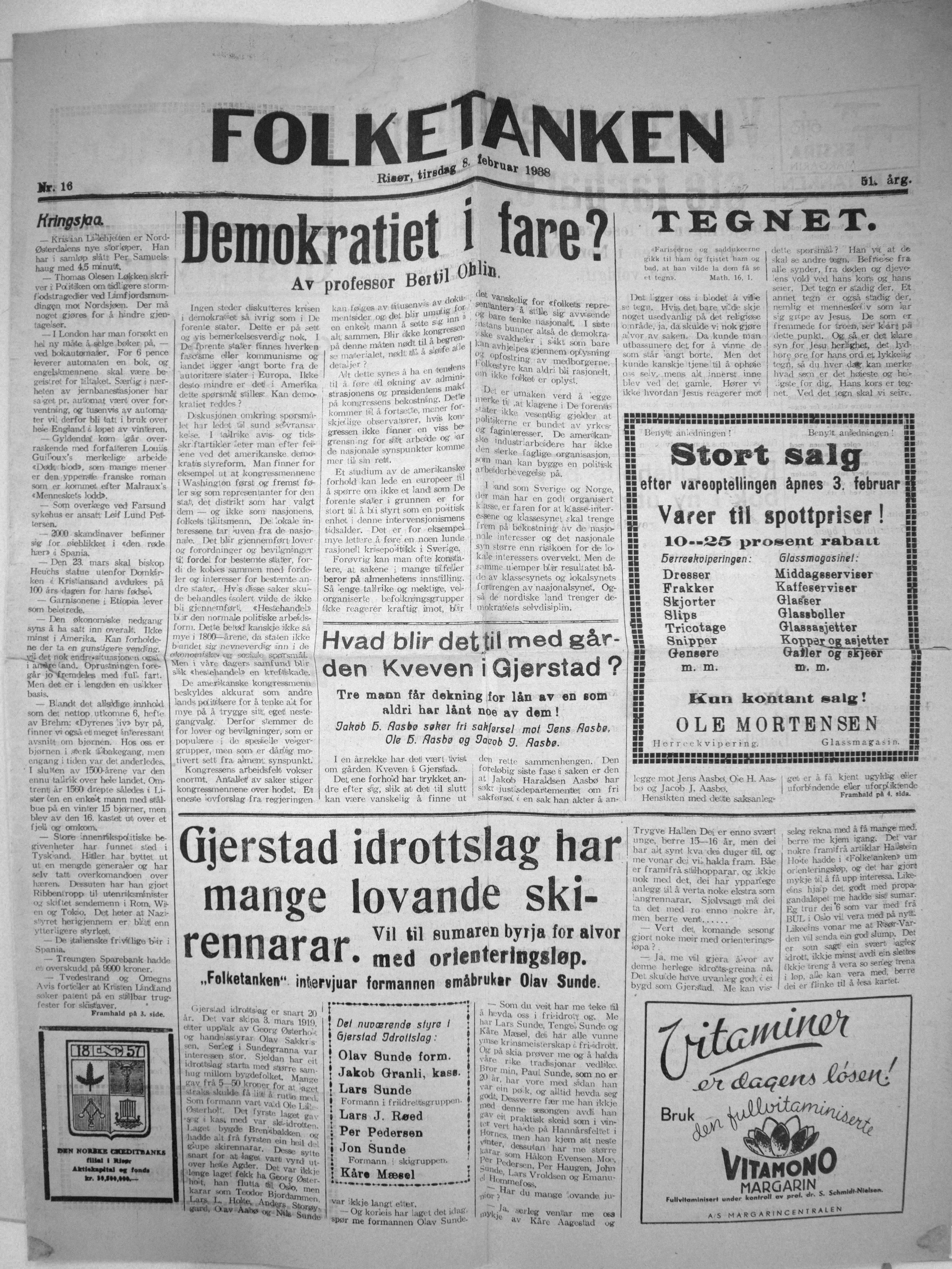

Folketanken was a Norwegian newspaper published in Risør in Agder county. The newspaper was edited by Johannes Kringlebotn who later served as the editor of Stavanger Aftenblad during the Nazi era.

Folketanken was started in 1887. It went defunct in 1945.
