= Christen Christensen (figure skater) =

Norwegian figure skater (1904–1969)

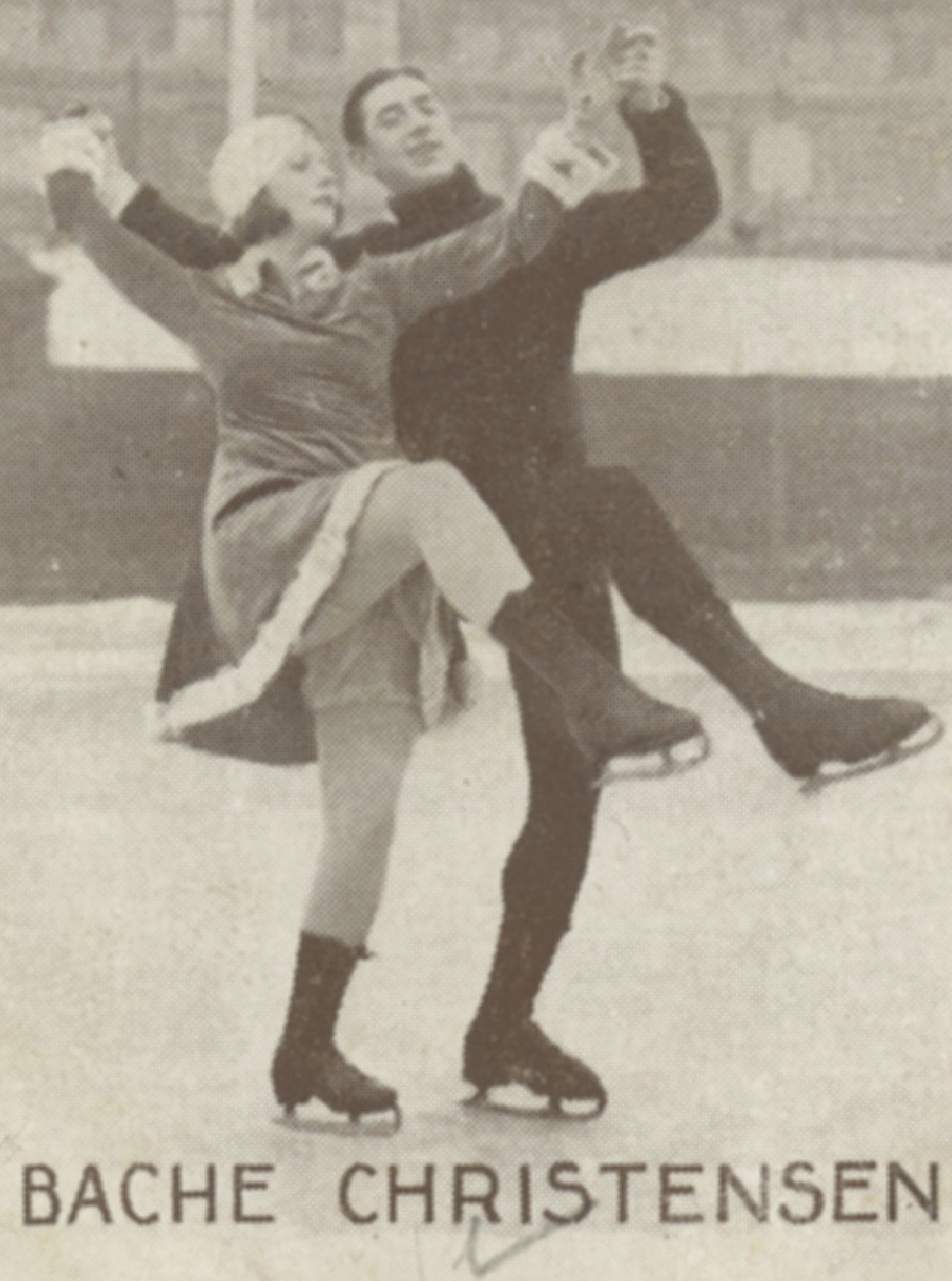
- Randi Bakke (left) and Christensen (right)

Personal information
- Full name: Christen Christensen
- Born: 17 November 1904 Oslo
- Died: 2 June 1969 (aged 64) Oslo

Figure skating career
- Country: Norway
- Partner: Randi Bakke
- Skating club: Oslo Skøiteklub
Medal record
Representing Norway
Pairs Figure skating
World Championships
Bronze medal – third place	1933 Stockholm	Pairs

Christen Christensen (17 September 1904 in Oslo – 2 June 1969 in Oslo) was a Norwegian pair skater. He represented Oslo Skøiteklub.

His pairs partner was Randi Bakke. They are the 1933 World bronze medalists. They finished fifth at the 1923 World Figure Skating Championships and the 1934 World Figure Skating Championships. They represented Norway at the 1936 Winter Olympics, where they placed 15th.

They were also eight-time (1929–1936) Norwegian national champions.

== Results ==
(with Randi Bakke)

Event	1923	1929	1930	1931	1932	1933	1934	1935	1936
Winter Olympic Games									15th
World Championships	5th					3rd	5th		
Norwegian Championships		1st	1st	1st	1st	1st	1st	1st	1st
