= Olav Totland =

Norwegian politician

Olav Totland (11 September 1904 – 26 July 1996) was a Norwegian politician for the Labour Party.

He was elected to the Norwegian Parliament from Bergen in 1969, but was not re-elected in 1973. He had previously served as a deputy representative during the term 1965–1969, but sat through half of the term as a regular representative, replacing Nils Langhelle who died in August 1967.

Born in Bergen, Totland took a cand.theol. education in 1934. He was vicar at Bruvik Church in Bruvik from 1948 to 1958, but then returned to become vicar in Bergen. He was a member of Bergen city council from 1959 to 1971. He was a member of the city school board from 1960 to 1971, chairing it from 1966 to 1967. He was also active in Blå Kors, the Norwegian member organization of the International Federation of the Blue Cross, and the Association of Norwegian Christian Socialists.
