= Alf Grindrud =

Norwegian politician

Alf Martinius Grindrud (2 July 1904 – 17 May 1959) was a Norwegian politician for the Labour Party.

During the German occupation of Norway he was a member of the Norwegian resistance movement. He was arrested in January 1944, and spent time at the concentration camps Grini, Natzweiler, Dachau, Ottobrunn, Dautmergen and Vaihingen. In April 1945 sixteen Norwegians were liberated by the White Buses from Vaihingen, among them Grindrud and later Prime Minister Trygve Bratteli.

Grindrud served as a deputy representative to the Norwegian Parliament from the Market towns of Buskerud county during the term 1945–1949.
