= Odd Erling Melsom =

Norwegian military officer and newspaper editor

Odd Erling Melsom (10 February 1900 – 9 June 1978) was a Norwegian military officer and newspaper editor.

== Pre-war career ==
He was born in Kristiania as a son of travellers. He finished his secondary education at Kristiania Cathedral School in 1918, and graduated from the Norwegian Military Academy in 1922. He worked as a lieutenant for one year before working as sub-editor in the newspaper Hedemarkens Amtstidende from 1923 to 1930. In 1925 he married Idunna Louise Marcussen. He then edited Hedemarkens Amtstidende in 1931, was a journalist in Østlendingen from 1931 to 1935 and editor-in-chief of Hedmarks Fylkesavis, Frihetskampen and Ny Dag between 1935 and 1937.

He was an early member of the Fascist party Nasjonal Samling, and was their second ballot candidate in Hedmark behind Oliver Møystad in the 1936 general election, although he was outside the party between 1936 and the summer of 1940. From 1937 to 1940 he worked as a military officer again.

== World War II and post-war life ==
From 1940 Norway was occupied by Nazi Germany, and in the autumn Melsom was hired as sub-editor in their official newspaper Fritt Folk. From New Years' of 1941–42 he became press director in the Nazi-controlled Norwegian Confederation of Trade Unions. On 1 July 1942 he became editor-in-chief of the Confederation of Trade Unions magazine Norsk Arbeidsliv. On 1 March 1944 he was promoted to editor-in-chief of Fritt Folk. He was a prolific agitator against Capitalism, Marxism and Pan-Germanism, supporting Norwegian nationalism and (national) socialism.

He lost his position when the war ended and the Quisling regime fell in May 1945. During the legal purge in Norway after World War II he was convicted of treason and in 1948 sentenced to twelve years of forced labour. After serving his sentence he became heavily involved in the historical revisionism of former Nasjonal Samling (NS) members. He edited their newspaper Folk og Land from 1958 to 1978, and published three books on his version of World War II history: På nasjonal uriaspost (1975), Nasjonal Samling og fagorganisasjonen (1977) and Fra kirke- og kulturkampen under okkupasjonen (1980). His trilogy has been called "the closest thing we get to an official NS history on the occupation" and "the standard work on the occupation seen from 'the other side'".
