= Øistein Hermansen =

Norwegian politician

Øistein Hermansen (25 July 1919 – 29 March 1992) was a Norwegian politician for the Communist Party.

He served as a deputy representative to the Parliament of Norway from Hedmark during the terms 1954–1957 and 1958–1961. In total he met during 46 days of parliamentary session.
