= Bjarne Gran =

Norwegian journalist (1918–1992)

- Born: 23 February 1918; Kristiania, Norway
- Died: 14 December 1992 (aged 74); Oslo
- Occupations: Journalist and literary consultant

Bjarne Gran (23 February 1918 – 14 December 1992) was a Norwegian journalist, historian and literary consultant. He was born in Kristiania. He worked for the newspaper Verdens Gang from 1945, and was assigned to the Norwegian Broadcasting Corporation from 1954. Among his books are Streiftog i vår tid from 1960, and FN 25 år from 1970. He was the principal consultant for the eight-volume book series Norge i krig from 1984 to 1987, edited by Magne Skodvin.
