= Reidar Andreas Lyseth =

Norwegian politician

Reidar Andreas Lyseth (14 July 1904 – 1 March 1987) was a Norwegian politician for the Labour Party.

He was elected to the Norwegian Parliament from the Market towns of Sør-Trøndelag and Nord-Trøndelag in 1950, and was re-elected on one occasion. He had previously served in the position of deputy representative during the term 1945–1949.

Lyseth was born in Trondheim and was a member of Trondheim city council in 1931–1934, and a member of its executive committee in the periods 1945–1947, 1947–1951 and 1951–1954.
