= Eirik Vandvik =

Norwegian classical scholar

Eirik Vandvik (1904–1953) was professor in literature at the University of Oslo. Vandvik was one of the major interpreters of the ancient Greek and Latin literature, and saw it as his purpose to make these works available to Norwegian literati.

Vandvik interpreted major works like "Greek tragedy" - a collection of tragedies and the "Iliad". He wrote in "nynorsk". He was instrumental in gathering material for a dictionary of medieval Latin in Norway.
