= Bobben Hagerup =

Norwegian jazz drummer (1911–1992)

- Born: Otto Hagerup; 3 December 1911; Trondheim, Norway
- Died: 4 July 1992 (aged 80); Larvik
- Known for: Jazz drummer

Bobben Hagerup (3 December 1911 – 4 July 1992) was a Norwegian jazz drummer.

== Personal life ==
Hagerup was born in Trondheim on 3 December 1911, to Einar Hagerup and Martha Fossum. He married Berna Kristensen in 1944.

== Career ==
A professional from 1928, Hagerup joined Theaterkafeens orkester in Trondheim at age 17, and played with various orchestras in Trondheim. From 1934 he was based in Oslo, a member of Pete Iwers' orchestra, also with engagements in Sweden, Finland, Denmark and Switzerland. He made his album debut in 1939, and from 1939 was assigned with Øivind Bergh's orchestra, eventually as part of the Norwegian Radio Orchestra.

His books include Trommeteknikk (volume I, 1944; volume II, 1962), and Trommeslageren from 1946.

Hagerup died in Larvik on 4 July 1992.
