= Einar Granum =

Norwegian painter and educator

- Born: 30 June 1920; Bergen, Norway
- Died: 25 February 1992 (aged 71); Bærum, Norway
- Education: Norwegian National Academy of Craft and Art Industry; Norwegian National Academy of Fine Arts
- Occupations: Painter, illustrator, educator

Einar Granum (30 June 1920 – 25 February 1992) was a Norwegian painter, illustrator, writer and educator. He is known for founding the art school Einar Granum Kunstfagskole in Oslo.

== Personal life ==
Granum was born on 17 January 1904 in Bergen, to Ragnhild Henrikke Serigstad and Einar Granum. He was married to Sidsel Fanny Hemstad.

== Career ==
Granum studied at the Norwegian National Academy of Craft and Art Industry from 1937 to 1941, and further at the Norwegian National Academy of Fine Arts from 1945 to 1948 under Per Krohg and Aage Storstein. He also studied at Statens Lærerskole i forming in Oslo from 1965 to 1967.

His public works include decorations of Majorstuen primary school from 1949, Gripsalen in Grand Hotel, Kristiansund (1953), and decorations for Haile Selassie in Addis Ababa (1955). He is represented in the Norwegian National Museum of Art, Architecture and Design with a drawing from 1958 titled Seks av byens kjøtere følger meg overalt.

In the 1950s Granum wrote illustrated travel reports for the newspaper Dagbladet, and he was art critic for the newspaper Asker og Bærum Budstikke from 1968. His books include Vi tegner og maler ("Drawing and painting", 1968), Vagabond i Oslo by ("Vagabond in the city of Oslo", 1969), Vi ser på kunst ("We look at art", 1976), and Anvendt kunstanatomi ("Applied art anatomy", 1987).

In 1970 he established the art school Einar Granum Kunstskole, and was running this school along with his wife. A one-year school from 1973, the school offered a Two-Year curriculum from 1983. In 2001 its name was changed to Einar Granum Kunstfagskole.

Granum died in Bærum Municipality on 25 February 1992.
