= Ole Johansen =

Norwegian politician

Ole Johansen (17 December 1904 – 31 December 1986) was a Norwegian politician for the Liberal Party.

He served as a deputy representative to the Norwegian Parliament from Sør-Trøndelag during the term 1965–1969.
