= Agnes Bakkevig =

Norwegian politician

- Born: 7 March 1910; Kristiania, Norway
- Died: 3 February 1992 (aged 81)
- Occupation: Politician

Agnes Bakkevig (7 March 1910 – 3 February 1992) was a Norwegian politician.

She was elected deputy representative to the Storting for the periods 1961–1965, 1965–1969 and 1969–1973 for the Conservative Party. She replaced Edvard Isak Hambro at the Storting from May to September 1966.
