= Klaus Gjøstein =

Norwegian painter (1905–1992)

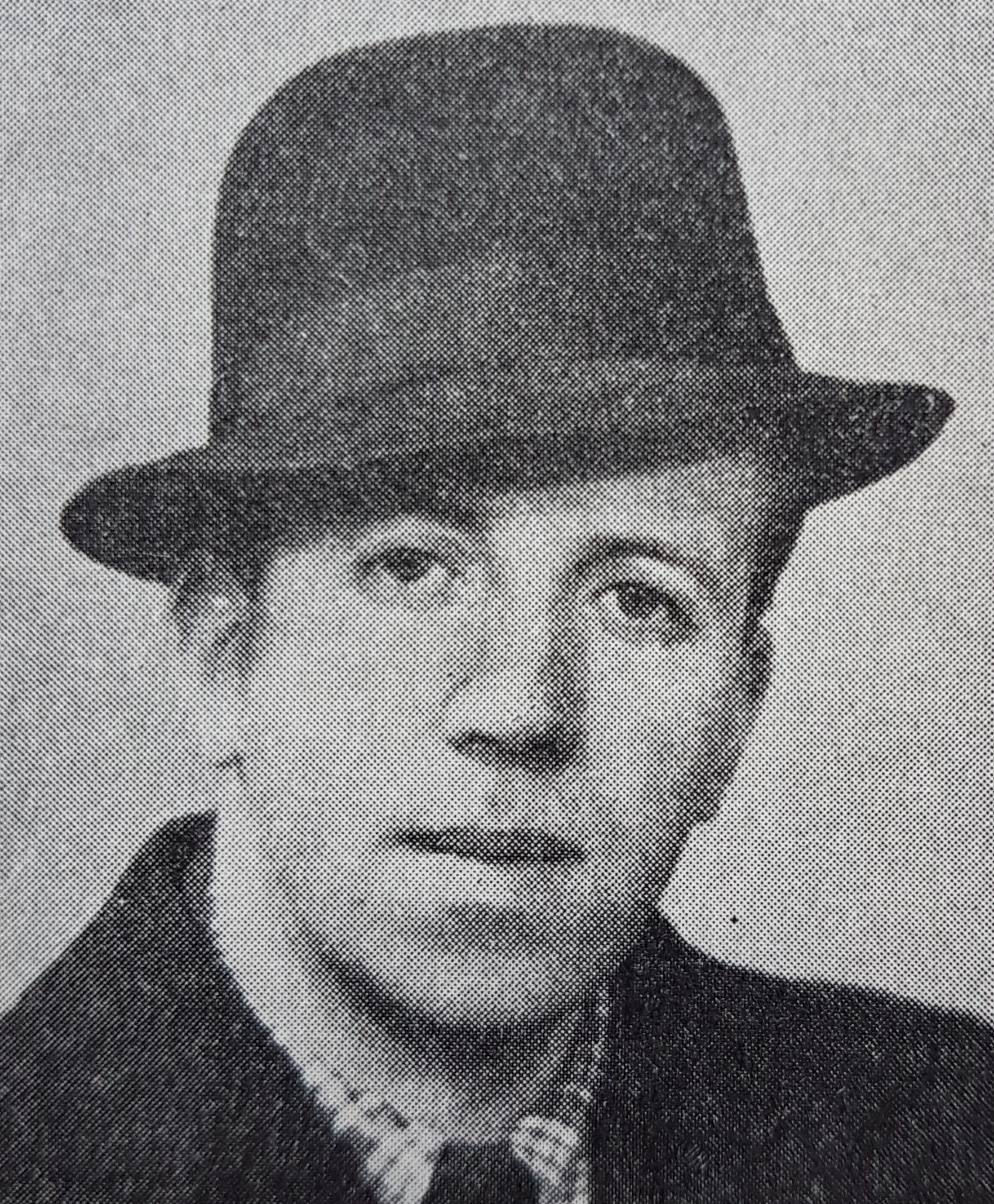
Klaus Gjøstein IKL

Klaus Gjøstein (26 December 1905 – 15 November 1992) was a Norwegian painter.

He was born in Voss Municipality as a son of Olav Gjøstein and Marta Kvale. He studied at the Norwegian National Academy of Craft and Art Industry and the Norwegian National Academy of Fine Arts from 1927 to 1930.

He made his debut at Høstutstillingen in 1928 and took part fifteen times in that exhibition. He also had two solo exhibitions at Kunstnernes Hus, among others, and was represented in collective exhibitions in other Nordic countries.

During the occupation of Norway by Nazi Germany Gjøstein was imprisoned in the Grini detention camp from March to July 1942.
