= Arvid Brodersen =

Norwegian sociologist (1904–1996)

- Born: 22 September 1904; Trondheim, Norway
- Died: 2 July 1996 (aged 91)
- Occupation: sociologist

Arvid Brodersen (22 September 1904 – 2 July 1996) was a Norwegian sociologist, a UNESCO leader, and later a professor at the New School for Social Research in New York City.

Born in Trondheim, Brodersen studied sociology at the University of Berlin. During World War II he was a member of the Norwegian resistance movement, and is known for establishing a communication channel to central Wehrmacht officers. He died in Oslo.

== Selected works ==
- Mellom frontene (1979)
