= Fritt Folk =

Norwegian newspaper

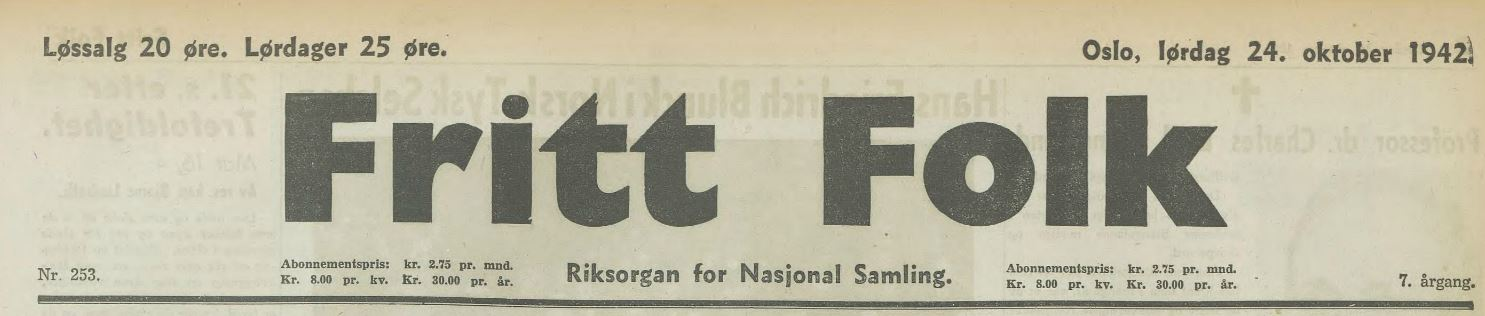
- Editor: Herlof Harstad (1936); Arnt Rishovd (1937–1944); Odd Melsom (1944–1945)
- Founded: 1936; 90 years ago
- Political alignment: National Socialism
- Language: Norwegian
- Headquarters: Oslo
- Country: Norway

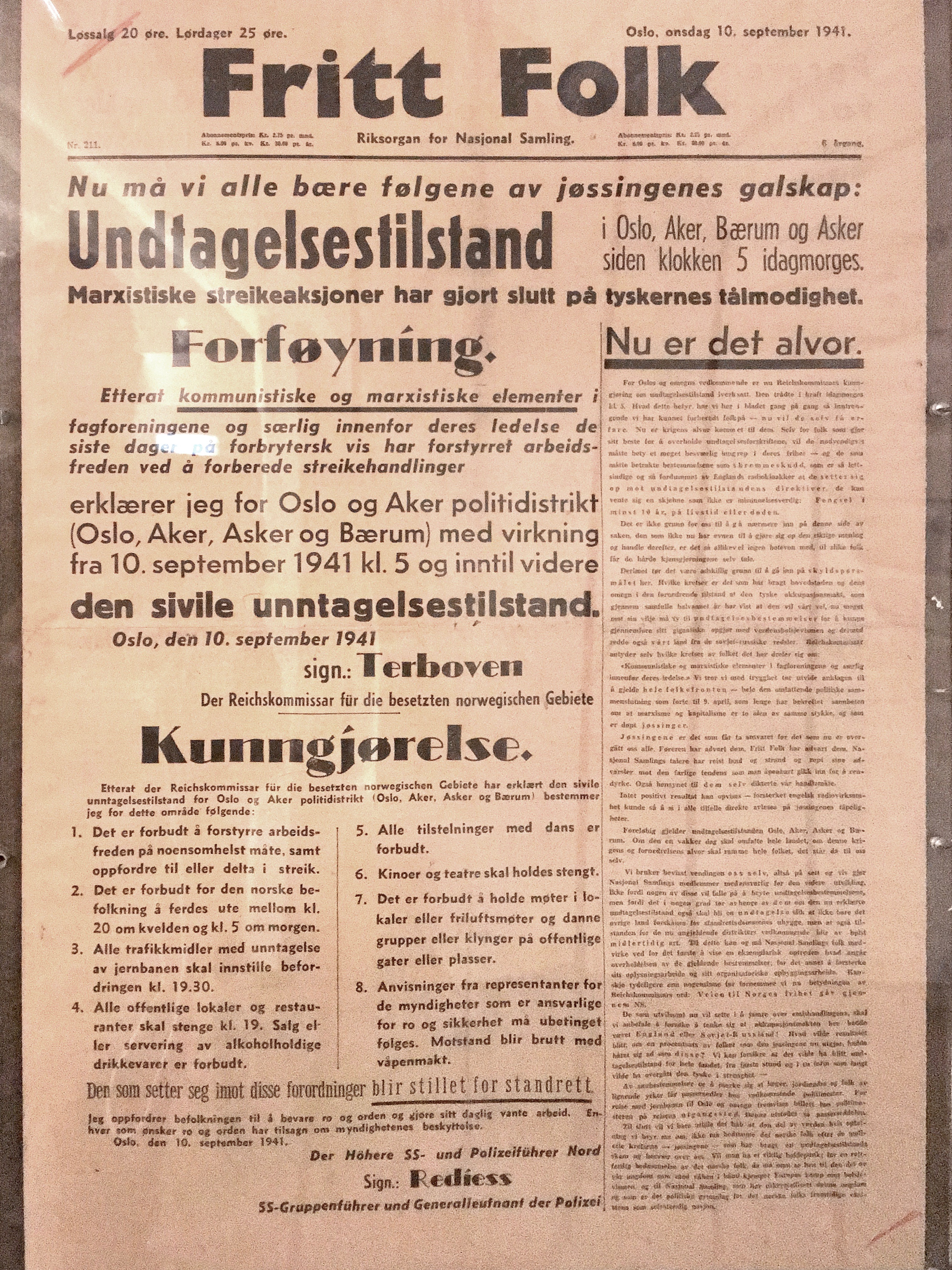
Fritt Folk on 10 September 1941

Fritt Folk ("Free People") was a Norwegian newspaper, published in Oslo. It was the official organ of the fascist party Nasjonal Samling, and came to prominence during the Second World War.

== History ==
Fritt Folk had a predecessor in a party newspaper for Nasjonal Samling. The party was founded in 1933 and the party newspaper in 1934. Fritt Folk was published for the first time on 26 March 1936, and had the tagline "Riksorgan for Nasjonal Samling" ("national organ for Nasjonal Samling"). The first editor-in-chief was Herolf Harstad. Funded by party members and the Kingdom of Italy's legation in Oslo, it was published daily. However, after Nasjonal Samling suffered a large defeat in the 1936 Norwegian parliamentary election, effort dwindled and it was an obscure, weekly newspaper. Editor from 1937 to 1944 was Arnt Rishovd. From 1 April 1940 it was again published daily, this time with funding from Nazi Germany.

On 9 April 1940 Norway was invaded by Nazi Germany, and an occupation started. Two days after the invasion, Fritt Folk was sent out as a supplement to popular newspapers such as Aftenposten. This ended on 15 April when Quisling was intermittently deposed and the Administrative Council was installed, but the newspaper continued to prosper under Nazi rule. It had certain competitors in that many existing newspapers were usurped by Nazis, including Aftenposten, and they brought the same kind of news as Fritt Folk. Other newspapers were stopped, and when Arbeiderbladet was stopped in August 1940, Fritt Folk usurped its offices and printing press. A prerogative for Fritt Folk was that Norwegian businesses and companies were forced to advertise in the newspaper, which boosted the economy. The circulation was secret, and this and some other administrative aspects of the newspaper have not yet been unveiled.

Even though the newspaper was controlled by Presseabteilung, it had a certain tendency to not follow German directions in all cases. Among others, it allowed Johannes S. Andersen to respond to rumours that he was a Nazi by printing his statement "although I have done many wrong things in my life, a Nazi I am not. Yours sincerely Johs. S. Andersen". The newspaper sometimes criticized decisions made by Nasjonal Samling, especially under its last editor (1944–1945), Odd Erling Melsom. The German occupiers issued their own, German-language newspaper, Deutsche Zeitung in Norwegen with a circulation of about 40,000 copies.

The last issue came on 7 May 1945.

== Editors ==
- Herlof Harstad 1936
- Arnt Rishovd 1937–1944
- Odd Melsom 1944–1945
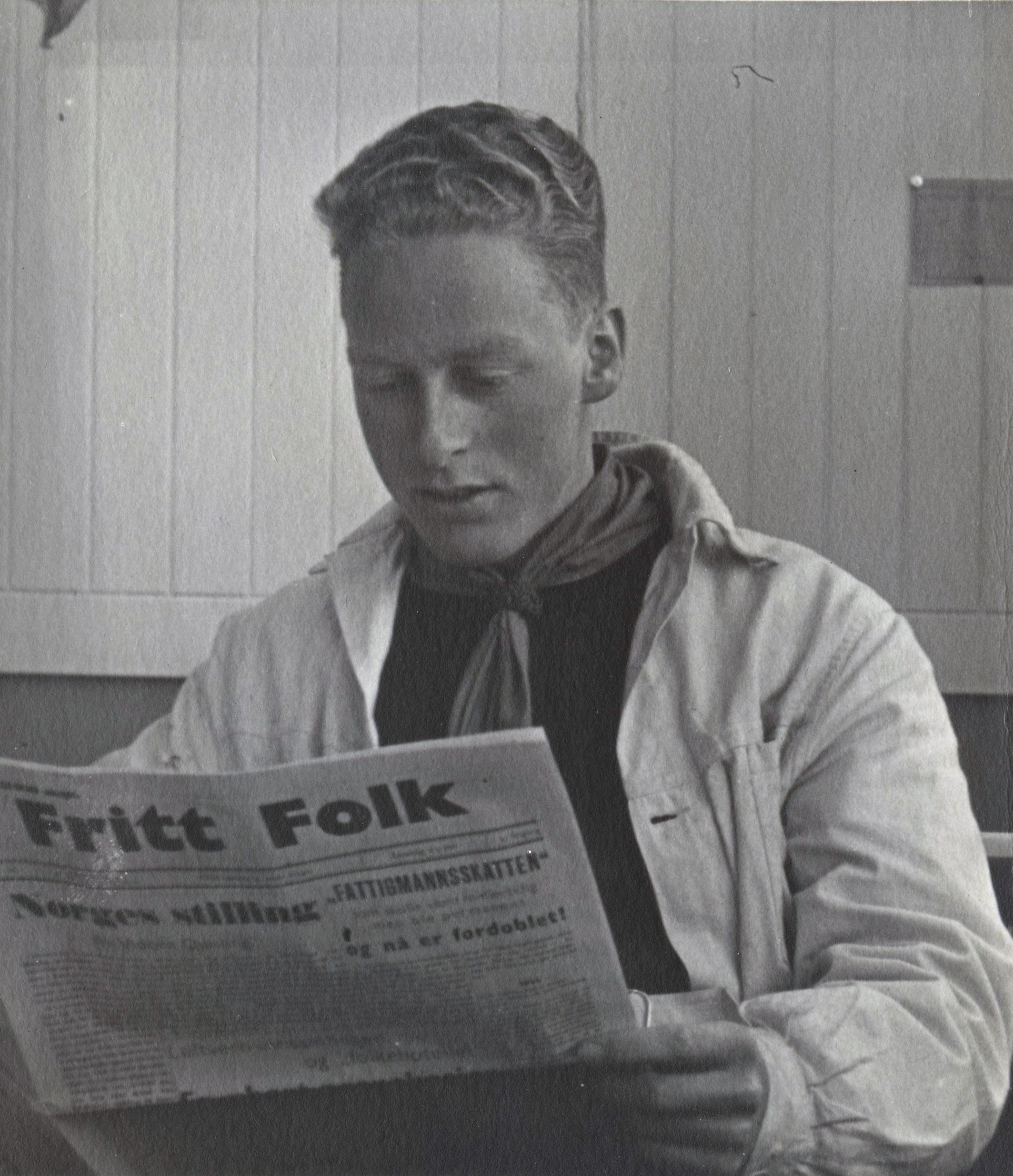
Engineering student at NTH reading Fritt Folk in 1940.
Credit: Trondheim byarkiv
