= Lillemor Aars =

Norwegian ceramist (1904 –1992)

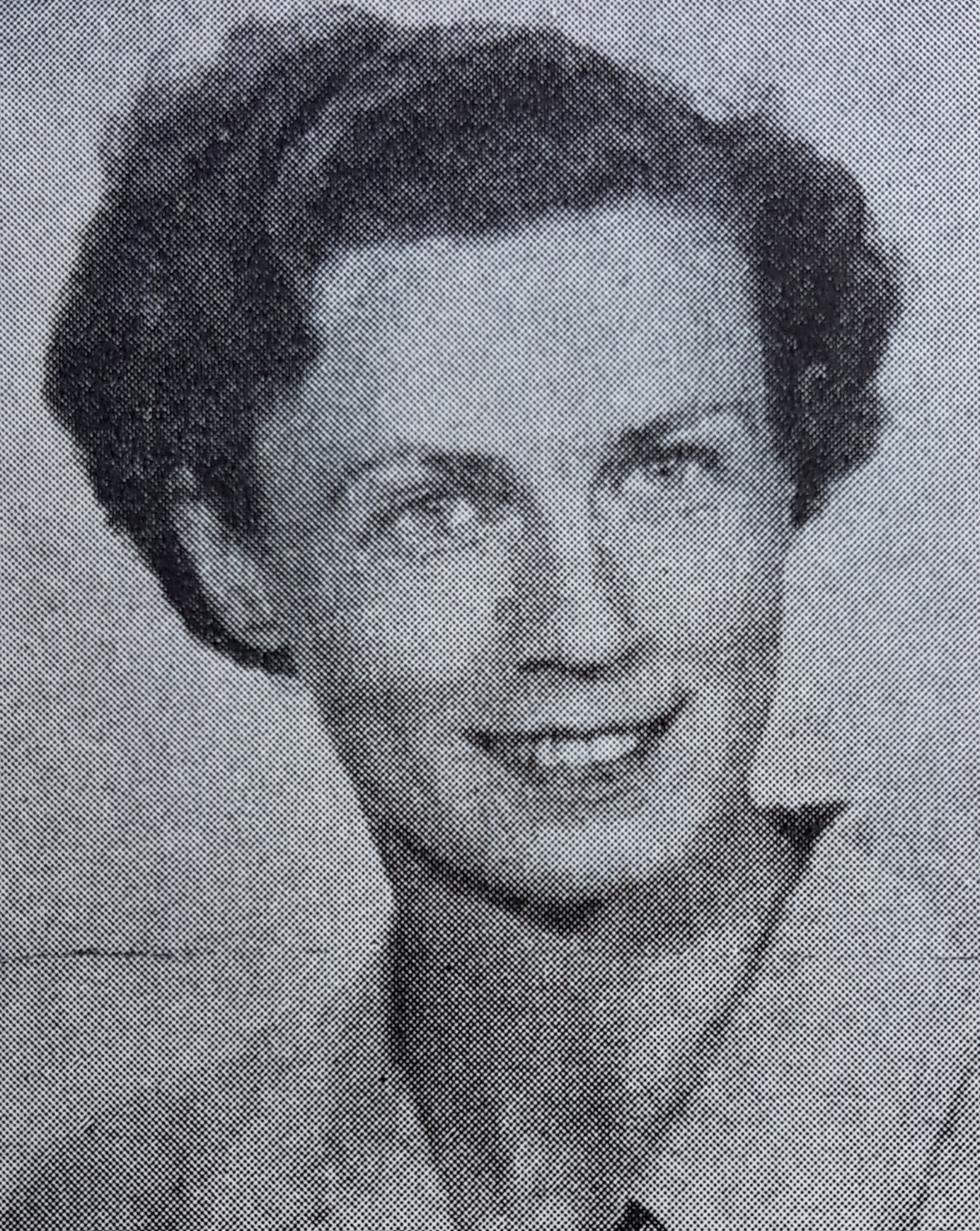
- Born: Julie Thaulow Aubert; 17 January 1904; Kristiania, Norway
- Died: 21 October 1992 (aged 88); Oslo
- Education: Norwegian National Academy of Craft and Art Industry
- Occupation: Ceramist

Lillemor Aars (née Julie Thaulow Aubert; 17 January 1904 – 21 October 1992) was a Norwegian ceramist and artisan. She designed products for Porsgrund Porcelain Factory, Hadeland Glassverk, and Graverens Teglverk, and eventually established her own ceramic workshop.

== Personal life ==
Aars was born as Julie Thaulow Aubert on 17 January 1904 in Kristiania, a daughter of Julius Th. Aubert and Birgitte Myhre. She was married to artist Ferdinand Aars from 1927 to 1947, and to Olaf Bang from 1948.

== Career ==
Aars studied at the Norwegian National Academy of Craft and Art Industry from 1920 to 1922, and in 1924 with André Lhote. Originally a painter and printmaker, she made her debut at the annual art exhibition Høstutstillingen in Oslo in 1926. Following her marriage in 1927, she started working on applied arts, and as designer for companies such as Porsgrund Porcelain Factory, Hadeland Glassverk and Graverens Teglverk. She had assignments for Jakob Prytz and Eilif Whist, and established her own ceramic workshop in 1937.

In 1937 she contributed to the International Exposition of Art and Technology in Modern Life in Paris, and two years later to the 1939 New York World's Fair. In 1947 she had an assignment in Helsinki at the factory Arabia.

Her works were bought by various museums, and were acquired for The Royal Lodge, Holmenkollen. She is represented in the Norwegian National Museum of Art, Architecture and Design, and at the Röhsska Museum. She also contributed with illustrations, and illustrated several books.

Aars died in Oslo on 21 October 1992.
