= Berge Helle Kringlebotn =

Norwegian politician

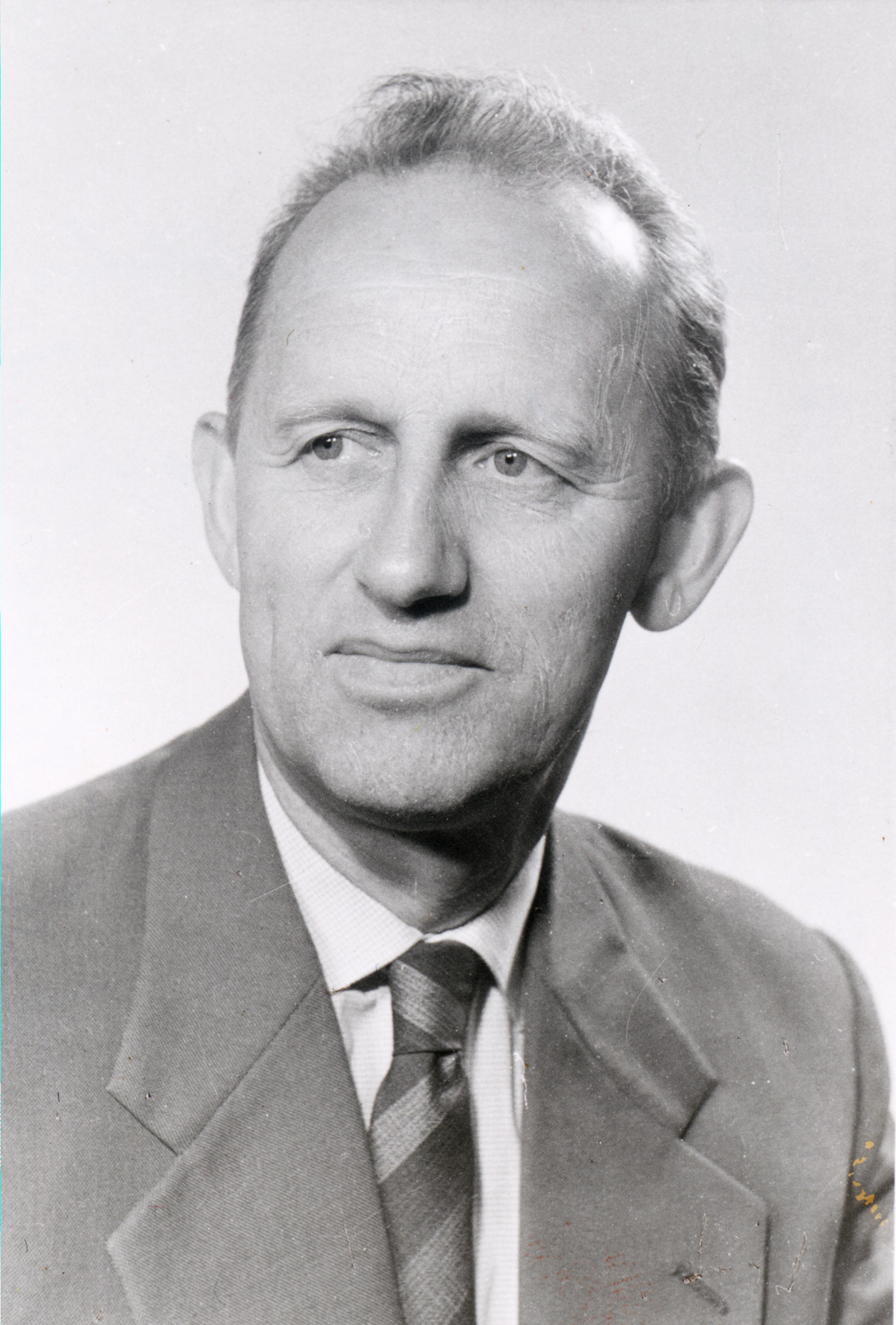
Berge H Kringlebotn

Berge Helle Kringlebotn (22 January 1904 – 19 August 1992) was a Norwegian politician for the Liberal Party.

He was born in Tune Municipality. He was elected to the Norwegian Parliament from Aust-Agder in 1961, but was not re-elected in 1965.

Kringlebotn was involved in local politics on the municipal council of Flosta Municipality between 1937 and 1940, and in Søndeled Municipality between 1951 and 1959.<
