= Tønjum =

Village in Vestland, Norway

- Village
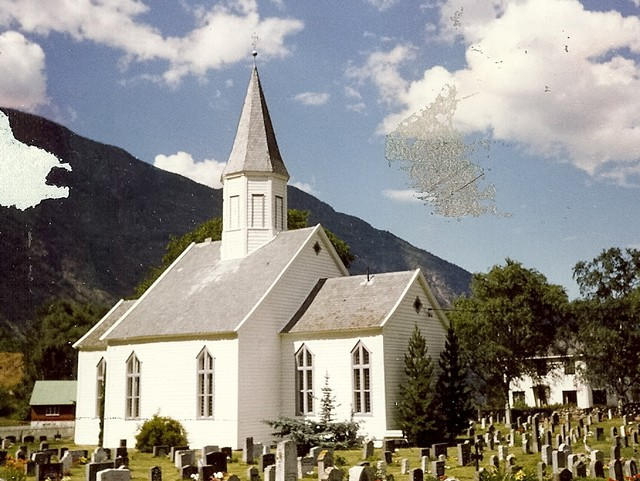
- View of the local church
- Interactive map of Tønjum
- Location within Vestland Location within Norway
- Coordinates: 61.0584°N 7.5184°E
- Country: Norway
- Region: Western Norway
- County: Vestland
- District: Sogn
- Municipality: Lærdal Municipality
- Elevation: 33 m (108 ft)
- Time zone: UTC+01:00 (CET)
  - Summer (DST): UTC+02:00 (CEST)
- Post Code: 6887 Lærdal

Tønjum is a village in Lærdal Municipality in Vestland county, Norway. The village is located along the river Lærdalselvi, about 5 kilometres (3.1 mi) southeast of the municipal centre of Lærdalsøyri. The eastern end of the Lærdal Tunnel (part of the European route E16 highway) is located just north of Tønjum. The highway leaves the tunnel and heads south through Tønjum, past Tønjum Church, and then east towards the village of Borgund and the Filefjell mountains.

The village is primarily a farming village with assorted vegetable production as their main occupation. In recent years, the growing of cherries has become more prevalent.
