= Borgund Municipality (Sogn og Fjordane) =

Former municipality in Sogn og Fjordane, Norway

Borgund Municipality Borgund herred
- Former municipality
- Sogn og Fjordane within Norway

- Borgund within Sogn og Fjordane
- Coordinates: 61.0487°N 7.8135°E
- Country: Norway
- County: Sogn og Fjordane
- District: Sunnfjord
- Established: 1 Jan 1864
  - Preceded by: Lærdal Municipality
- Disestablished: 1 Jan 1964
  - Succeeded by: Lærdal Municipality
- Administrative centre: Steinklepp

Government
  - Mayor (1958–1963): Anders Lunden (Ap)

Area (upon dissolution)
  - Total: 569.1 km^{2} (219.7 sq mi)
  - Rank: #170 in Norway
- Highest elevation: 1,920.23 m (6,300.0 ft)

Population (1963)
  - Total: 501
  - Rank: #678 in Norway
  - Density: 0.9/km^{2} (2.3/sq mi)
  - Change (10 years): ▲ +10.1%
- Demonym: Borgynd

Official language
  - Norwegian form: Bokmål
- Time zone: UTC+01:00 (CET)
  - Summer (DST): UTC+02:00 (CEST)
- ISO 3166 code: NO-1423

Borgund is a former municipality in the old Sogn og Fjordane county, Norway. The 569-square-kilometre (220 sq mi) municipality existed from 1864 until its dissolution in 1964. The area is now part of Lærdal Municipality in the traditional district of Sogn in Vestland county. The administrative centre was the village of Steinklepp where there was a store, a bank, and a school. The village of Borgund was located just southwest of Steinklepp. The historical Filefjell Kongevegen road passes through the Borgund area.

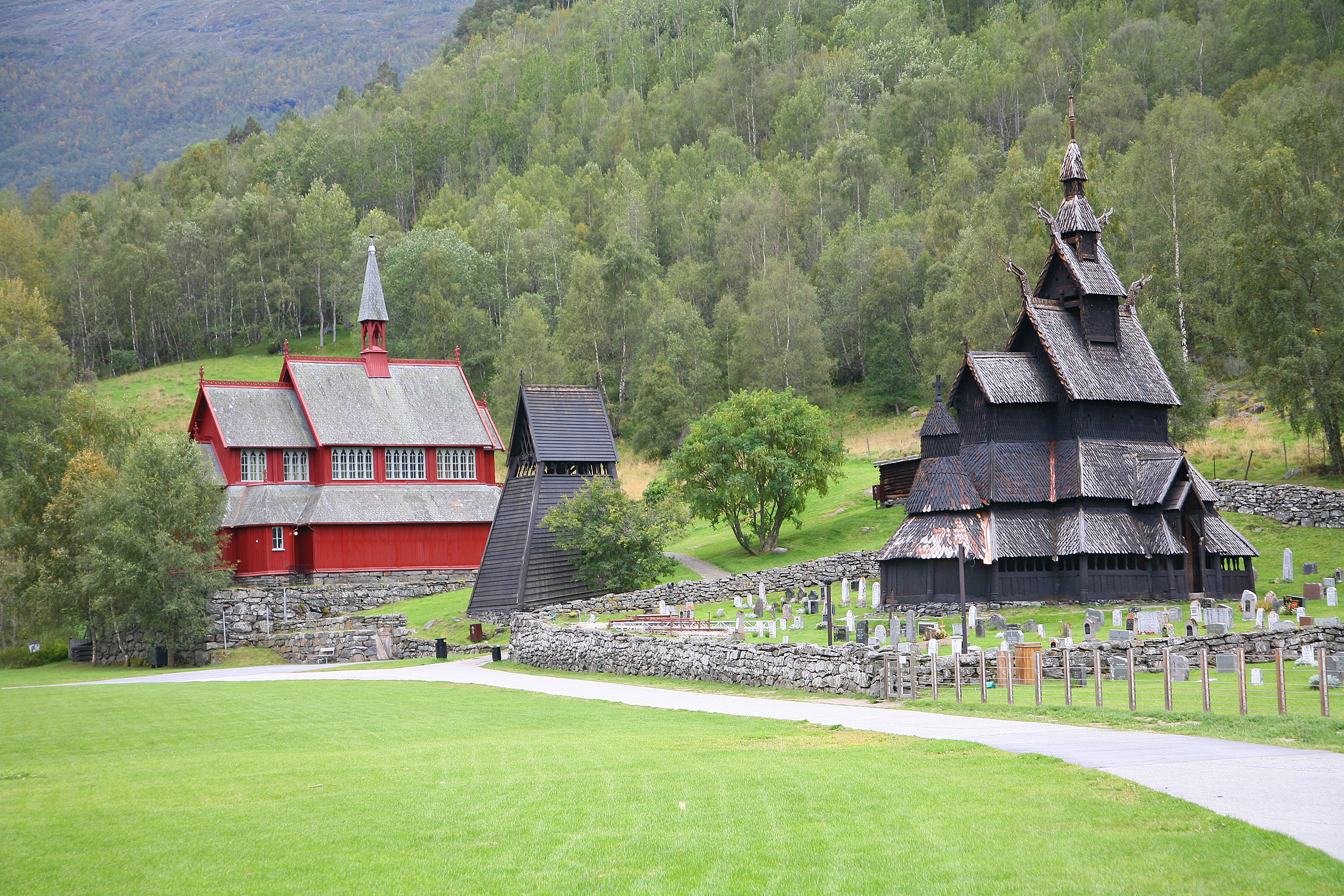
View of the Borgund Stave Church and the newer Borgund Church

Prior to its dissolution in 1964, the 569.1-square-kilometre (219.7 sq mi) municipality was the 170th largest by area out of the 689 municipalities in Norway. Borgund Municipality was the 678th most populous municipality in Norway with a population of about 501. The municipality's population density was 0.9 inhabitants per square kilometre (2.3/sq mi) and its population had increased by 10.1% over the previous 10-year period.

== History ==
The parish of Borgund was established as a municipality in 1864 when the large Lærdal Municipality was divided in two. The western part (population: 2,777) remained as Lærdal Municipality and the eastern part (population: 963) became the new Borgund Municipality. (A year earlier, the northern part of Lærdal (population: 1,791) was separated to become the new Aardal Municipality.)

During the 1960s, there were many municipal mergers across Norway due to the work of the Schei Committee. On 1 January 1964, the following areas were merged to form a new, larger Lærdal Municipality:

- all of Borgund Municipality (population: 492)
- all of Lærdal Municipality (population: 1,755)
- the Muggeteigen area (population: 11) of the neighboring Årdal Municipality

=== Name ===
The municipality (originally the parish) is named after the old Borgund farm (Old Norse: Borgyndr or Borgund) since the historic Borgund Stave Church was built there. The first element is borg which means "castle" or "fortified place". The last element is the suffix -und which means "rich" or "having a lot of something".

=== Churches ===
The Church of Norway had one parish (sokn) within Borgund Municipality. At the time of the municipal dissolution, it was part of the Lærdal prestegjeld and the Indre Sogn prosti (deanery) in the Diocese of Bjørgvin.

Churches in Borgund Municipality
Parish (sokn)	Church name	Location of the church	Year built
Borgund	Borgund Church	Borgund	1868
Borgund	Borgund Stave Church	Borgund	1150

== Geography ==
Borgund Municipality was situated near the southeastern end of the Sognefjorden, along the Lærdalselvi river. The lower parts of the municipality were farms such as Sjurhaugen and Nedrehegg. They were at an elevation of about 270 m (890 ft) above sea level. The highest point in the municipality was the 1,920.23-metre (6,300.0 ft) tall mountain Høgeloft, located in the Filefjell range, right on the border with Hemsedal Municipality (in Buskerud county). The lakes Eldrevatnet, Juklevatnet, and Øljusjøen were also located near the border with Hemsedal Municipality.

Årdal Municipality was located to the northwest, Lærdal Municipality was located to the west, Hol Municipality and Ål Municipality (both in Buskerud county) were located to the south, Hemsedal Municipality (in Buskerud county) was located to the southeast, and Vang Municipality (in Oppland county) was located to the northeast.

== Government ==
While it existed, Borgund Municipality was responsible for primary education (through 10th grade), outpatient health services, senior citizen services, welfare and other social services, zoning, economic development, and municipal roads and utilities. The municipality was governed by a municipal council of directly elected representatives. The mayor was indirectly elected by a vote of the municipal council. The municipality was under the jurisdiction of the Gulating Court of Appeal.

=== Municipal council ===
The municipal council (Herredsstyre) of Borgund Municipality was made up of 13 representatives that were elected to four year terms. The tables below show the historical composition of the council by political party.

Borgund herredsstyre 1959–1963
Party name (in Norwegian)	Number of representatives
Labour Party (Arbeiderpartiet)	8
Conservative Party (Høyre)	1
Joint List(s) of Non-Socialist Parties (Borgerlige Felleslister)	4
Total number of members:	13
Note: On 1 January 1964, Borgund Municipality became part of Lærdal Municipality.

Borgund herredsstyre 1955–1959
Party name (in Norwegian)	Number of representatives
Labour Party (Arbeiderpartiet)	7
Joint List(s) of Non-Socialist Parties (Borgerlige Felleslister)	6
Total number of members:	13

Borgund herredsstyre 1951–1955
Party name (in Norwegian)	Number of representatives
Labour Party (Arbeiderpartiet)	6
Joint List(s) of Non-Socialist Parties (Borgerlige Felleslister)	5
Local List(s) (Lokale lister)	1
Total number of members:	12

Borgund herredsstyre 1947–1951
Party name (in Norwegian)	Number of representatives
Labour Party (Arbeiderpartiet)	7
Joint List(s) of Non-Socialist Parties (Borgerlige Felleslister)	5
Total number of members:	12

Borgund herredsstyre 1945–1947
Party name (in Norwegian)	Number of representatives
Labour Party (Arbeiderpartiet)	4
Joint List(s) of Non-Socialist Parties (Borgerlige Felleslister)	6
Local List(s) (Lokale lister)	2
Total number of members:	12

Borgund herredsstyre 1937–1941*
Party name (in Norwegian)	Number of representatives
Labour Party (Arbeiderpartiet)	4
Joint List(s) of Non-Socialist Parties (Borgerlige Felleslister)	5
Local List(s) (Lokale lister)	3
Total number of members:	12
Note: Due to the German occupation of Norway during World War II, no elections were held for new municipal councils until after the war ended in 1945.

=== Mayors ===
The mayor (Nynorsk: ordførar) of Borgund Municipality was the political leader of the municipality and the chairperson of the municipal council. The following people held this position:

- 1864–1867: Haakon Henrikson Eraker
- 1868–1873: John Knutson Hegg
- 1874–1875: Haakon H. Kvamme, Sr.
- 1876–1883: John Knutson Hegg
- 1884–1887: Roar H. Husum
- 1888–1891: Ola Kirkevold
- 1892–1901: John Knutson Hegg
- 1902–1910: Anders L. Nesset
- 1911–1914: Ola E. Eggum
- 1915–1916: Jakob S. Hovland
- 1917–1917: Lars A. Nesse
- 1918–1919: Håkon H. Kvamme, Jr.
- 1920–1922: Ola O. Kvenshagen
- 1923–1928: Lars A. Nesse
- 1929–1931: Ola O. Kvenshagen
- 1936–1945: Nils A. Lyslo
- 1945–1945: Roar O. Husum
- 1946–1947: Hallvard Borlaug
- 1952–1955: Roar O. Husum
- 1948–1951: Torstein Hillestad (Ap)
- 1956–1957: Olav Sletthagen(Ap)
- 1958–1963: Anders Lunden (Ap)

== See also ==
- List of former municipalities of Norway
