= Johan Austbø =

Norwegian linguist and composer

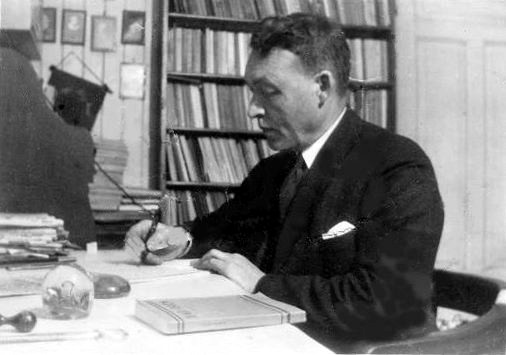
Johan Austbø

Johan Austbø (October 23, 1879 – December 22, 1945) was a Norwegian teacher, dancer, poet, composer, singer, and proponent of Nynorsk.

== Life and work ==
Austbø was born in Ikjefjord in Lavik Municipality in Nordre Bergenhus County. His feelings for poetry and Nynorsk were awakened when he was a student at the folk high school in Sogndal. One of his teachers, Jens Kvåle, published the Nynorsk periodical Ungdom (Youth), in which Austbø published his first poem. After graduating from folk high school, he attended the teachers' college in Elverum, where he passed his teaching exam in 1901. Soon afterwards he was hired as a teacher, and he taught his first year in Frønningen and Fresvik. In 1906 he moved to the island of Lepsøya in Hordaland County, before establishing himself in Skotselv in Buskerud County in 1912. There he served as a teacher at the army school and the Skotselv school for several decades.

Austbø was a central figure in establishing the Norwegian Folk Ballad Society (Norwegian: Den norske folkeviseringen) in the early 1920s. In the book Folkedansen i 20 år 1903–1923 (Twenty Years of Folk Dance, 1903–1923), he described a journey to the Faroe Islands in 1911, where a delegation of 70 Norwegians traveled to better understand traditional Faroese dance. After this, he established youth societies in several places in the country to promote folk dance. Austbø served as the head of the Norwegian Folk Ballad Society for many years. He also assisted Torstein Høverstad in efforts to create a teachers' college in Bondi in Asker Municipality.

Austbø wrote extensively for the magazine Nynorsk Vekeblad (Nynorsk Weekly) from its inception in 1934 until his death. He wrote many articles for it, and published several of his own poems in it. In addition, he created a large body of literary work, which included stories, poetry collections, children's books, and biographies of Svend Foyn and Olav Bjaaland. According to Anna Ellefsen of Kongsberg, who taught with Austbø, it was he that wrote the well-known folk song "Bind deg ein blomekrans" (Make Yourself a Flower Wreath).

He died in Hokksund in Øvre Eiker Municipality.

== "Den svalande vind" ==
Austbø wrote a variety of songs and melodies. His best-known song is "Den svalande vind" (The Cooling Breeze), which he also sang on the radio program Folkemusikkhalvtimen (Half Hour of Folk Music) in 1939. The song has been recorded by numerous artists, such Lillebjørn Nilsen, Finn Kalvik, and Helene Bøksle. The song is based on an old folk song, and Austbø's lyrics relate the unhappy love story "Attom fjella her sør" (Behind the Mountains Here in the South). Austbø was surprised that a few decades after he had written the song that the lyrics were referred to as a "folk song from Telemark" because the melody was from Sogn and the lyrics were his own.

== Family ==
Johan Austbø was the son of the farmer and builder Hans Einarson Østerbø and Sigrid Botolfsdatter Måren. He was the grandfather of the pianist Håkon Austbø, and the great-grandfather of the photographer Frode Fjerdingstad and the artist Bard Ash.

== Selected works ==
- Austbø, Johan (1904). Heim. Voss: Unglydens bokhandel.
- Austbø, Johan (1906). Korn og kransar. Voss.
- Austbø, Johan (1908). Einar Tambeskjelvar: ei sogebok i kvæde. Bergen: Det Vestlandske Maalkontor.
- Austbø, Johan (1911). Paa urudd veg: fortelnad. Bergen.
- Austbø, Johan (1919). Fagerheim : spel i tri vendingar. Risør: Erik Gunleikson.
- Austbø, Johan (1923). Olav Sletto. Ein studie. Oslo.
- Austbø, Johan, & Einar Øygard (ed.) (1923?). Folkedansen i 20 aar: 1903-1923. Ski: Den norske folkeviseringen.
- Austbø, Johan, & Olaf Hanssen (1928). Bar og blom: til upplesing i ungdomslag / samla av Johan Austbø og Olaf Hanssen. Oslo: Norli.
- Austbø, Johan, & Olaf Hanssen (1930). Bar og blom: til upplesing i ungdomslag, Andre samlingi / samla av Johan Austbø og Olaf Hanssen. Oslo: Norli.
- Austbø, Johan, & Olaf Hanssen (1932). Bar og blom: til upplesing i ungdomslag, Tridje samling / samla av Johan Austbø og Olaf Hanssen. Oslo: Norli.
- Austbø, Johan (1933). Skjemtboka: Norsk humor. Oslo: Norli.
- Austbø, Johan (1939). Norsk skjemt. Oslo: Norli.
- Austbø, Johan (1941). Bjørgulv og brørne hans: forteljing for born. Oslo: Fonna forlag.
- Austbø, Johan (1942). Snodige sellar. Oslo: Fonna forlag.
- Austbø, Johan (1943). Sissel: ei gløgg og forlevande smågjente. Oslo: Fonna forlag.
- Austbø, Johan (1943). Festtalar: i selskap og samkomor, i lag og lyd, i gjestebod og gilde. Oslo: Fonna forlag.
- Austbø, Johan (1943). Høvisk framferd: sed og skikk. Oslo: Fonna forlag.
- Austbø, Johan (1943). Svend Foyn: mannen og verket hans. Oslo: Fonna forlag.
- Austbø, Johan (1945). Olav Bjåland: idrottsmann og polfarar. Oslo: Fonna forlag.
- Austbø, Johan (1946). Gunnar og geitosten, med tekningar av Jens R. Nilssen. Oslo: Fonna forlag.
- Austbø, Johan (1948). Sissel reiser til Oslo. Oslo.
