= Sjur Hopperstad =

Norwegian politician

Sjur Hopperstad (30 October 1930 – 28 September 2015) was a Norwegian politician for the Centre Party.

A farmer from Vangsnes, he was a member of the municipal council of Balestrand Municipality from 1960 to 1964. That year the area around Vangsnes was transferred to Vik Municipality, and so Hopperstad became a municipal council member for Vik Municipality starting in 1964. He served as mayor of Vik Municipality from 1974 to 1987. He was also a member of the county council from 1964 to 1975 and 1980–99. Since 1992 he served as county mayor, and from 1995 as deputy county mayor.

Political offices
Preceded by Julius Fure	County mayor of Sogn og Fjordane; 1992–1995	Succeeded by Knut O. Aarethun
