= Nils Sandal =

Norwegian politician (born 1950)

Nils Reielson Sandal (born 9 June 1950 in Breim Municipality) is a Norwegian politician for the Centre Party.

Sandal served as a deputy representative to the Norwegian Parliament from Sogn og Fjordane during the term 1997–2001. In the local level, he served as deputy mayor in Gloppen Municipality in 1984–1986, and then mayor in 1987–1999. Following the 2007 elections, Sandal became the new county mayor (fylkesordfører) of Sogn og Fjordane.

== Sources ==
- "Nils Sandal" (in Norwegian). Storting.
- NRK County Encyclopedia of Sogn og Fjordane (in Norwegian)

Political offices
Preceded by Knut O. Aarethun	County mayor of Sogn og Fjordane; 1999–present	Succeeded by
