= Jan Henrik Nitter Hansen =

Norwegian politician

Jan Henrik Nitter Hansen (1801–1879) was a Norwegian businessman and politician.

He was born at Døsen in the parish of Lyster (later spelled Luster) in Nordre Bergenhus county, Norway. He later relocated to the village of Lærdalsøyri, and became the most significant merchant and landowner there. Much of his real estate was bought at an auction in 1828. He also bought a number of ships, which were kept in traffic between Lofoten and the Baltic Sea. In 1858, he founded the transport company Nordre Bergenhus Amts Dampskibe (later known as Fylkesbaatane i Sogn og Fjordane) together with mayor Harald Ulrik Sverdrup and jurist Michael Aubert. He was also director of the local savings bank.

Jan Henrik Nitter Hansen was also involved in politics. He served as mayor of Lærdal Municipality from 1844 to 1845 and 1848 to 1857, and served as a deputy representative to the Norwegian Parliament in 1851 and 1854.

His son Tøger Ravn Jan Henrikson Hansen (b. 1850, Tøger Ravn for short), inherited his business interests, and served as mayor from 1880 to 1881, 1889 to 1901 and 1905 to 1907.
