= Lærdalsfjord =

Fjord in Vestland, Norway

Lærdalsfjorden
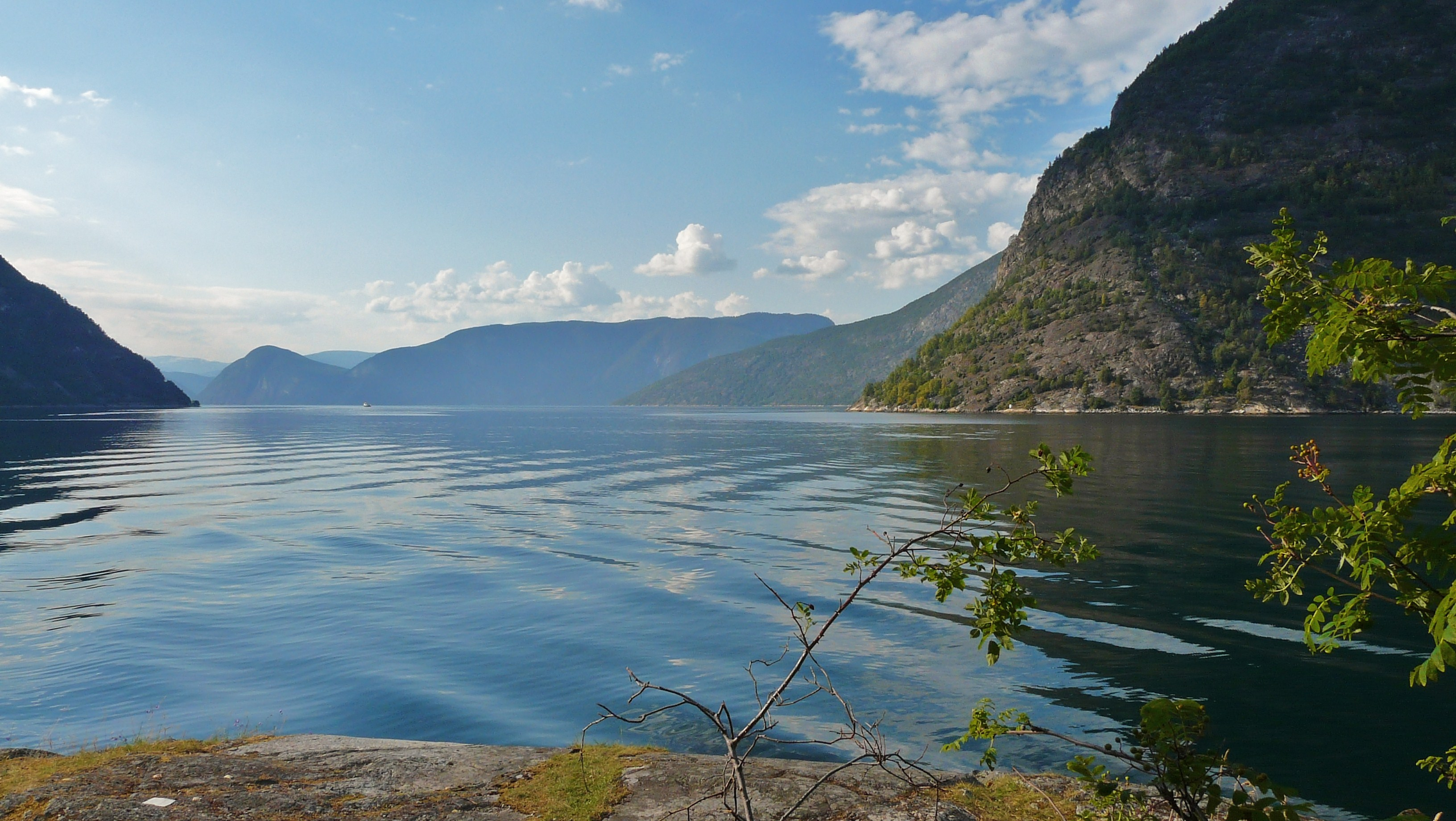
- View of the fjord
- Interactive map of Lærdalsfjorden
- Location: Vestland county, Norway
- Coordinates: 61.13144°N 7.38259°E
- Type: Fjord
- Basin countries: Norway
- Max. length: 9 kilometres (5.6 mi)
- Settlements: Lærdalsøyri

Lærdalsfjord or Lærdalsfjorden is a branch of the Sognefjord located on its southern side in Lærdal Municipality of Vestland county. Its length is about 9 kilometres (5.6 mi). The Lærdalsøyri river meets the fjord at the village of Lærdalsøyri. Lærdal Municipality surrounds the whole fjord and the Lærdalen valley which heads southeast/east from the fjord.

This fjord, known for its length, is one of the innermost branches of Sognefjorden. The fjord cuts into tall mountain masses with steep sides. On the fjord's eastern side, the Jotunheimen mountains rise to over 2,200 meters above sea level. The fjord also features lush bays and fjord banks with agriculture, including livestock, fruit, and berry cultivation. The bedrock of the region consists of Caledonian rocks.

== See also ==
- List of Norwegian fjords
