= Sogn og Fjordane County Municipality =

Sogn og Fjordane County Municipality Sogn og Fjordane fylkeskommune
- Former County
- Coat of arms

- Location in Norway
- Coordinates: 61°13′51″N 06°47′23″E
- Country: Norway
- Disestablished: 1 Jan 2020
- Administrative center: Leikanger

Government
  - County mayor: Jenny Følling
- ISO 3166 code: NO-14
- Schools: 12
- Pupils: 4,500
- Website: www.sfj.no

Sogn og Fjordane County Municipality (Norwegian: Sogn og Fjordane fylkeskommune) was the regional governing administration of the old Sogn og Fjordane county in Norway. The county municipality was established in its current form on 1 January 1976 when the law was changed to allow elected county councils in Norway. The county municipality was dissolved on 1 January 2020, when Sogn og Fjordane was merged with the neighboring Hordaland county, creating the new Vestland county which is led by the Vestland County Municipality.

The main responsibilities of the county municipality included the running of 12 upper secondary schools with 4,500 pupils. It also oversaw the county roadways, public transport, dental care, culture, and cultural heritage.

== County government ==
The county municipality's most important tasks included secondary education, recreation (sports and outdoor life), and cultural heritage. The county municipality was also responsible for all county roads (including ferry operations) and public transport (including school busses). The county municipality had further responsibility for regional land-use planning, business development, power production, and environmental management. The county also had responsibility for providing dental health services (in 2002, responsibility for hospitals and public medicine was transferred from the counties to the new regional health authorities).

=== County council ===
The county council (Norwegian: Fylkestinget) was made up of 31 representatives that were elected by direct election by all legal residents of the county every fourth year. The council was the legislative body for the county. The county council typically met about six times a year. Council members were divided into standing committees and an executive committee (fylkesutvalg), which met considerably more often. Both the council and executive committee (with at least 5 members) were led by the county mayor (Norwegian: fylkesordfører). The executive committee carried out the executive functions of the county under the direction of the whole council. The tables below show the historical composition of the council by political party.

Sogn og Fjordane fylkesting 2015–2019
Party name (in Nynorsk)	Number of representatives
Labour Party (Arbeidarpartiet)	9
Progress Party (Framstegspartiet)	2
Green Party (Miljøpartiet Dei Grøne)	1
Conservative Party (Høgre)	4
Christian Democratic Party (Kristeleg Folkeparti)	2
Centre Party (Senterpartiet)	10
Socialist Left Party (Sosialistisk Venstreparti)	1
Liberal Party (Venstre)	2
Total number of members:	31

Sogn og Fjordane fylkesting 2012–2015
Party name (in Nynorsk)	Number of representatives
Labour Party (Arbeidarpartiet)	11
Progress Party (Framstegspartiet)	3
Conservative Party (Høgre)	7
Christian Democratic Party (Kristeleg Folkeparti)	3
Centre Party (Senterpartiet)	10
Socialist Left Party (Sosialistisk Venstreparti)	2
Liberal Party (Venstre)	3
Total number of members:	39

Sogn og Fjordane fylkesting 2008–2011
Party name (in Nynorsk)	Number of representatives
Labour Party (Arbeidarpartiet)	11
Progress Party (Framstegspartiet)	4
Conservative Party (Høgre)	5
Christian Democratic Party (Kristeleg Folkeparti)	3
Centre Party (Senterpartiet)	11
Socialist Left Party (Sosialistisk Venstreparti)	2
Liberal Party (Venstre)	3
Total number of members:	39

Sogn og Fjordane fylkesting 2004–2007
Party name (in Nynorsk)	Number of representatives
Labour Party (Arbeidarpartiet)	10
Progress Party (Framstegspartiet)	3
Conservative Party (Høgre)	4
Christian Democratic Party (Kristeleg Folkeparti)	3
Centre Party (Senterpartiet)	12
Socialist Left Party (Sosialistisk Venstreparti)	3
Liberal Party (Venstre)	4
Total number of members:	39

Sogn og Fjordane fylkesting 2000–2003
Party name (in Nynorsk)	Number of representatives
Labour Party (Arbeidarpartiet)	10
Progress Party (Framstegspartiet)	2
Conservative Party (Høgre)	6
Christian Democratic Party (Kristeleg Folkeparti)	5
Centre Party (Senterpartiet)	10
Socialist Left Party (Sosialistisk Venstreparti)	2
Liberal Party (Venstre)	4
Total number of members:	39

Sogn og Fjordane fylkesting 1996–1999
Party name (in Nynorsk)	Number of representatives
Labour Party (Arbeidarpartiet)	11
Progress Party (Framstegspartiet)	2
Conservative Party (Høgre)	5
Christian Democratic Party (Kristeleg Folkeparti)	4
Centre Party (Senterpartiet)	10
Socialist Left Party (Sosialistisk Venstreparti)	2
Liberal Party (Venstre)	5
Total number of members:	39

Sogn og Fjordane fylkesting 1992–1995
Party name (in Nynorsk)	Number of representatives
Labour Party (Arbeidarpartiet)	10
Progress Party (Framstegspartiet)	1
Conservative Party (Høgre)	6
Christian Democratic Party (Kristeleg Folkeparti)	4
Centre Party (Senterpartiet)	10
Socialist Left Party (Sosialistisk Venstreparti)	4
Liberal Party (Venstre)	4
Total number of members:	39

Sogn og Fjordane fylkesting 1988–1991
Party name (in Nynorsk)	Number of representatives
Labour Party (Arbeidarpartiet)	12
Progress Party (Framstegspartiet)	2
Conservative Party (Høgre)	8
Christian Democratic Party (Kristeleg Folkeparti)	5
Red Electoral Alliance (Raud Valallianse)	1
Centre Party (Senterpartiet)	6
Socialist Left Party (Sosialistisk Venstreparti)	2
Liberal Party (Venstre)	3
Total number of members:	39

Sogn og Fjordane fylkesting 1984–1987
Party name (in Nynorsk)	Number of representatives
Labour Party (Arbeidarpartiet)	13
Progress Party (Framstegspartiet)	1
Conservative Party (Høgre)	8
Christian Democratic Party (Kristeleg Folkeparti)	5
Centre Party (Senterpartiet)	7
Socialist Left Party (Sosialistisk Venstreparti)	2
Liberal Party (Venstre)	3
Total number of members:	39

Sogn og Fjordane fylkesting 1980–1983
Party name (in Nynorsk)	Number of representatives
Labour Party (Arbeidarpartiet)	10
Conservative Party (Høgre)	8
Christian Democratic Party (Kristeleg Folkeparti)	6
Liberal People's Party (Liberale Folkepartiet)	1
Centre Party (Senterpartiet)	8
Socialist Left Party (Sosialistisk Venstreparti)	1
Liberal Party (Venstre)	3
Total number of members:	37

Sogn og Fjordane fylkesting 1976–1979
Party name (in Nynorsk)	Number of representatives
Labour Party (Arbeidarpartiet)	8
Conservative Party (Høgre)	6
Christian Democratic Party (Kristeleg Folkeparti)	5
New People's Party (Nye Folkepartiet)	2
Centre Party (Senterpartiet)	7
Socialist Left Party (Sosialistisk Venstreparti)	2
Liberal Party (Venstre)	2
Non-party lists (Upolitiske lister)	5
Total number of members:	37

=== County mayor ===
Since 1963, the county mayor (Norwegian: fylkesordfører) of Sogn og Fjordane was the political leader of the county and the chairperson of the county council. Prior to 1963, the County governor led the council which was made up of all of the mayors of the rural municipalities within the county. Here is a list of people who held this position:

- 1963–1963: Ragnvald Terum Winjum (V)
- 1963–1967: Nils Helgheim (Sp)
- 1968–1975: Leif Iversen (H)
- 1975–1987: Ola M. Hestenes (Sp)
- 1988–1991: Julius Fure (H)
- 1992–1995: Sjur Hopperstad (Sp)
- 1995–1998: Knut O. Aarethun (Ap)
- 1999–2011: Nils R. Sandal (Sp)
- 2011–2015: Åshild Kjelsnes (Ap)
- 2015–2019: Jenny Følling (Sp)

== Regional reform 2020 ==
In 2020, Sogn og Fjordane county merged with neighbouring Hordaland county to form the new Vestland county. The new Vestland county municipality was the government for the new county. The merger was part of a larger reform in local and regional administration initiated by the national government, which saw the number of county municipalities fall from 19 to 11 (several mergers were undone in 2024 after popular backlash by the residents of the new counties).

== Location ==
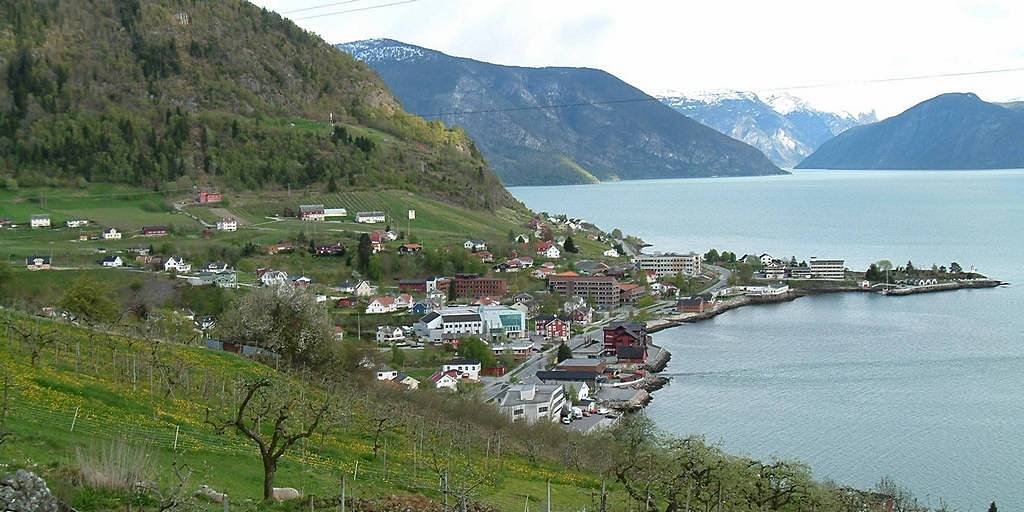
Leikanger with the county administration buildings visible

The administrative seat was located at the village of Leikanger in Leikanger Municipality where all of the county offices were located except for the cultural division, which is located in the town of Førde. Tore Eriksen was the final chief-of-administration. Traditionally, the county administration was said to be in the village of Hermansverk, which was regarded as the administrative seat, but Hermansverk and the neighboring village of Leikanger grew together over the years and more recently were considered to be one large village, and now the administrative seat is said to be Leikanger even though the buildings are still in the same place.

== Transport ==
The county previously owned the transportation company Fylkesbaatane i Sogn og Fjordane, which operated ferry services throughout the county. In 2001, Fylkesbaatane merged with the Møre og Romsdal County Municipality-owned Møre og Romsdal Fylkesbåtar to create the new company Fjord1, of which Sogn og Fjordane County Municipality remains a majority shareholder.
