= Tønjum Church =

Church in Vestland, Norway

- Tønjum kyrkje
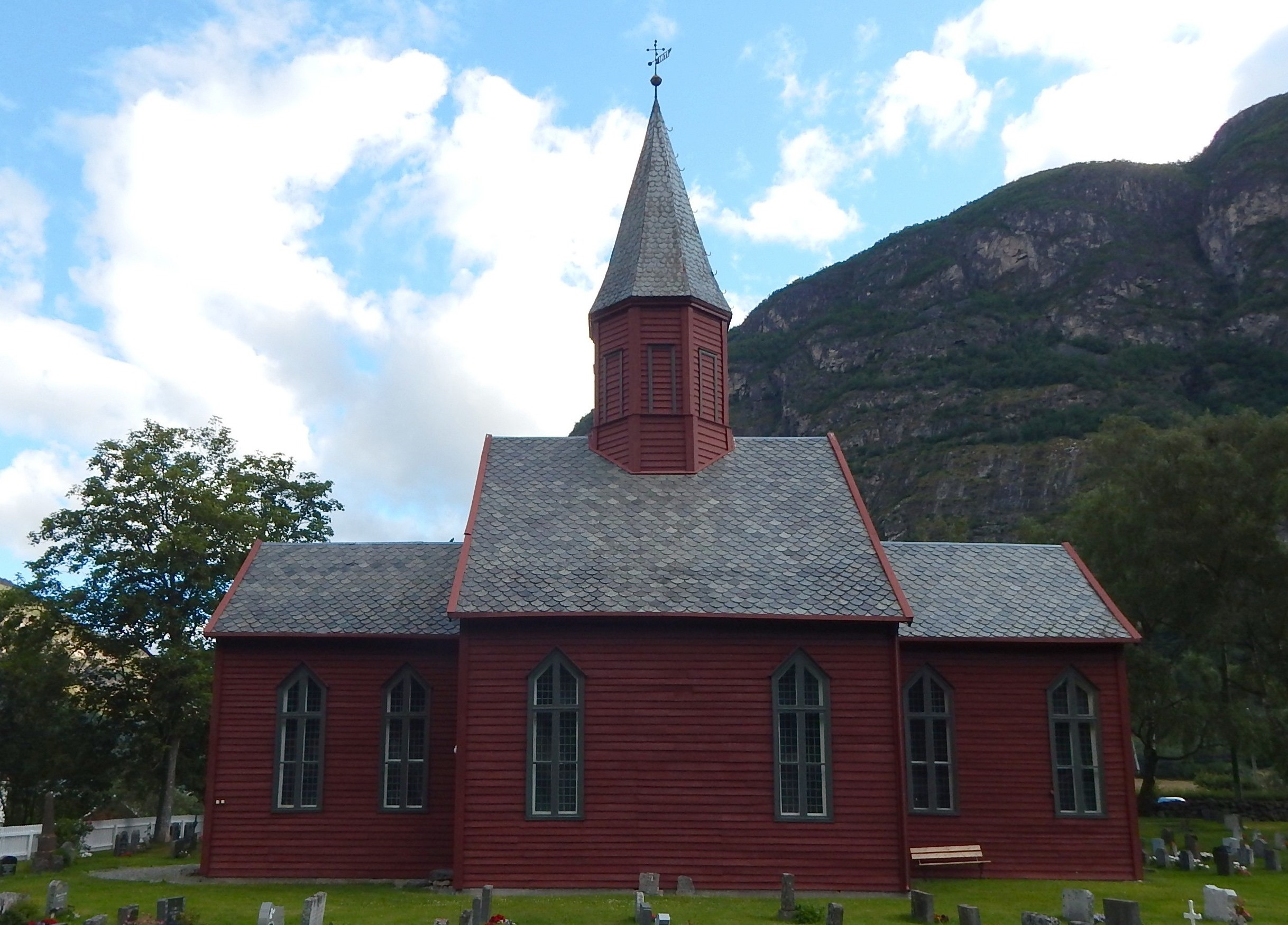
- View of the church
- Tønjum Church
- 61°03′26″N 7°31′03″E
- Location: Lærdal Municipality, Vestland
- Country: Norway
- Denomination: Church of Norway
- Previous denomination: Catholic Church
- Churchmanship: Evangelical Lutheran

History
- Status: Parish church
- Founded: c. 1200
- Consecrated: 30 September 1832

Architecture
- Functional status: Active
- Architectural type: Cruciform
- Completed: 1832 (194 years ago)

Specifications
- Capacity: 175
- Materials: Wood

Administration
- Diocese: Bjørgvin bispedømme
- Deanery: Sogn prosti
- Parish: Tønjum
- Norwegian Cultural Heritage Site
- Type: Church
- Status: Automatically protected
- ID: 85703

Tønjum Church (Norwegian: Tønjum kyrkje) is a parish church of the Church of Norway in Lærdal Municipality in Vestland county, Norway. It is located in the village of Tønjum. It is the church for the Tønjum parish which is part of the Sogn prosti (deanery) in the Diocese of Bjørgvin. The red, wooden church was built in a cruciform design in 1832 using plans drawn up by an unknown architect. The church seats about 175 people.

== History ==
The earliest existing historical records of the church date back to the year 1305, but the church was not new that year. The first church was likely a wooden stave church that was built during the early 1200s. The nave of the old church measured 10.7 by 8.1 metres (35 ft × 27 ft) with a choir that was 6.9 by 4.4 metres (23 ft × 14 ft). The church had a tower on the west end. It is said that the old stave church looked very similar to the Borgund Stave Church.

In 1814, this church served as an election church (Norwegian: valgkirke). Together with more than 300 other parish churches across Norway, it was a polling station for elections to the 1814 Norwegian Constituent Assembly which wrote the Constitution of Norway. This was Norway's first national elections. Each church parish was a constituency that elected people called "electors" who later met together in each county to elect the representatives for the assembly that was to meet at Eidsvoll Manor later that year.

On 12 January 1823, the old church was heavily damaged by the wind during a big winter storm and it had to be torn down. Soon after, there was some controversy about where to build the replacement church. The parish priest, Ludvig Daae, wanted to merge the Hauge Church parish and the Tønjum Church parish and build a new common church for both Tønjum and Hauge somewhere between the two historic church sites which were only about 3 kilometres (1.9 mi) apart. The local population, however, was firmly against this plan. They wanted a new church built at Tønjum and they wanted the old Hauge Church moved further away and rebuilt in the village of Lærdalsøyri. This situation did not resolve until after Daae's death in 1831 when the local people got their wish to rebuild at Tønjum. Not much is known about the architect of the church, but it was supposedly a man named Tøger from Hatlo. Some of the materials from the old church were reused in the new church. The new church was consecrated on 30 September 1832 by Bishop Jacob Neumann.

== See also ==
- List of churches in Bjørgvin
