= Nils Helgheim =

Norwegian politician

Nils Helgheim (14 June 1903 – 1 October 1982) was a Norwegian politician for the Centre Party.

He served as a deputy representative to the Norwegian Parliament from Sogn og Fjordane during the terms 1954–1957 and 1958–1961.

On the local level, he was a member of the municipal council for Jølster Municipality from 1933 to 1967, serving as mayor from 1952. In 1963 Helgheim became deputy county mayor (fylkesvaraordfører) of Sogn og Fjordane. In 1964, when illness struck the county mayor Ragnvald Terum Winjum, Helgheim moved up and assumed the post. Helgheim lost the post in 1967.

From 1952 to 1959 the farmer Helgheim was a member of the board of the Norwegian Agrarian Association. He served four years as deputy chairman.

Political offices
Preceded by Ragnvald Terum Winjum	County mayor of Sogn og Fjordane; 1964–1967	Succeeded by Leif Iversen
