= Ragnvald Winjum =

Norwegian jurist and politician

Ragnvald Terum Winjum (17 May 1917 – 4 January 1965) was a Norwegian jurist and politician for the Liberal Party.

A cand.jur. by education (1949), Winjum settled in Aurland in 1953, working as a farmer and attorney. In 1960 he became the mayor of Aurland Municipality.

In 1963 Winjum became the first to hold the post of county mayor (fylkesordfører) of Sogn og Fjordane. However, because of illness problems, he had to leave the post for then-deputy county mayor Nils Helgheim before even chairing a single council meeting.

Winjum also served as a deputy representative to the Norwegian Parliament from Sogn og Fjordane during the term 1961–1965. He died during the last year of the term.

Political offices
New office	County mayor of Sogn og Fjordane; 1963	Succeeded by Nils Helgheim
