= Lærdalselvi =

River in Vestland, Norway

Lærdalselvi Lærdalselva
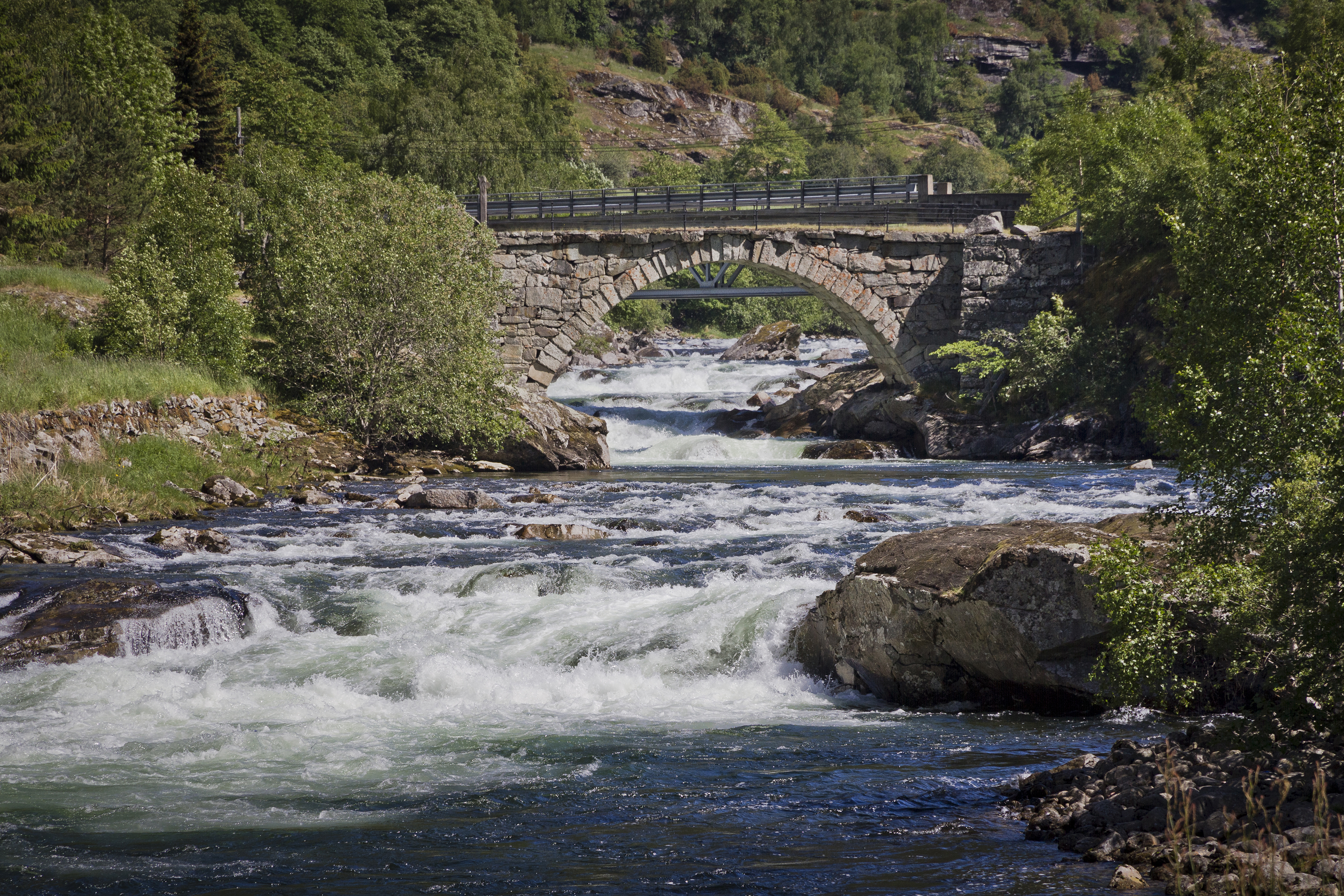
- View of the river

Location
- Country: Norway
- County: Vestland
- Municipalities: Lærdal Municipality

Physical characteristics
- Source: Confluence of Mørkedøla and Smeddalselva rivers
  - location: Eråk, Lærdal Municipality
  - coordinates: 61.0723°N 7.9347°E
  - elevation: 485 metres (1,591 ft)
- Mouth: Lærdalsfjorden
  - location: Lærdalsøyri, Lærdal Municipality
  - coordinates: 61.103°N 7.4706°E
  - elevation: 0 metres (0 ft)
- Length: 81 km (50 mi)
- Basin size: 1,184.11 km^{2} (457.19 sq mi)
- Discharge
  - average: 36.33 m^{3}/s (1,283 cu ft/s)

Lærdalselvi is a river in Vestland county, Norway. The lower part of the river Lærdalselvi is among Norway's best salmon fishing rivers. It is protected from pollution and development with status as a national salmon river.

The Lærdalselvi is formed by the confluence of the Smeddøla and Mørkedøla rivers at the Borlaug bridge near the small village of Eråk in Lærdal Municipality. The Smeddøla originates from a series of lakes in the Filefjell mountains along the border with Vang Municipality in Valdres, and the Mørkedøla has its uppermost sources south of the mountain Vesle Jukleeggi at an elevation of 1,920 metres (6,300 ft) above sea level. The Lærdalselvi flows mainly westward until it reaches the Lærdalsfjorden. The watershed area is 1,173 square kilometres (453 sq mi), which makes this the largest watershed in the northern part of Vestland county.

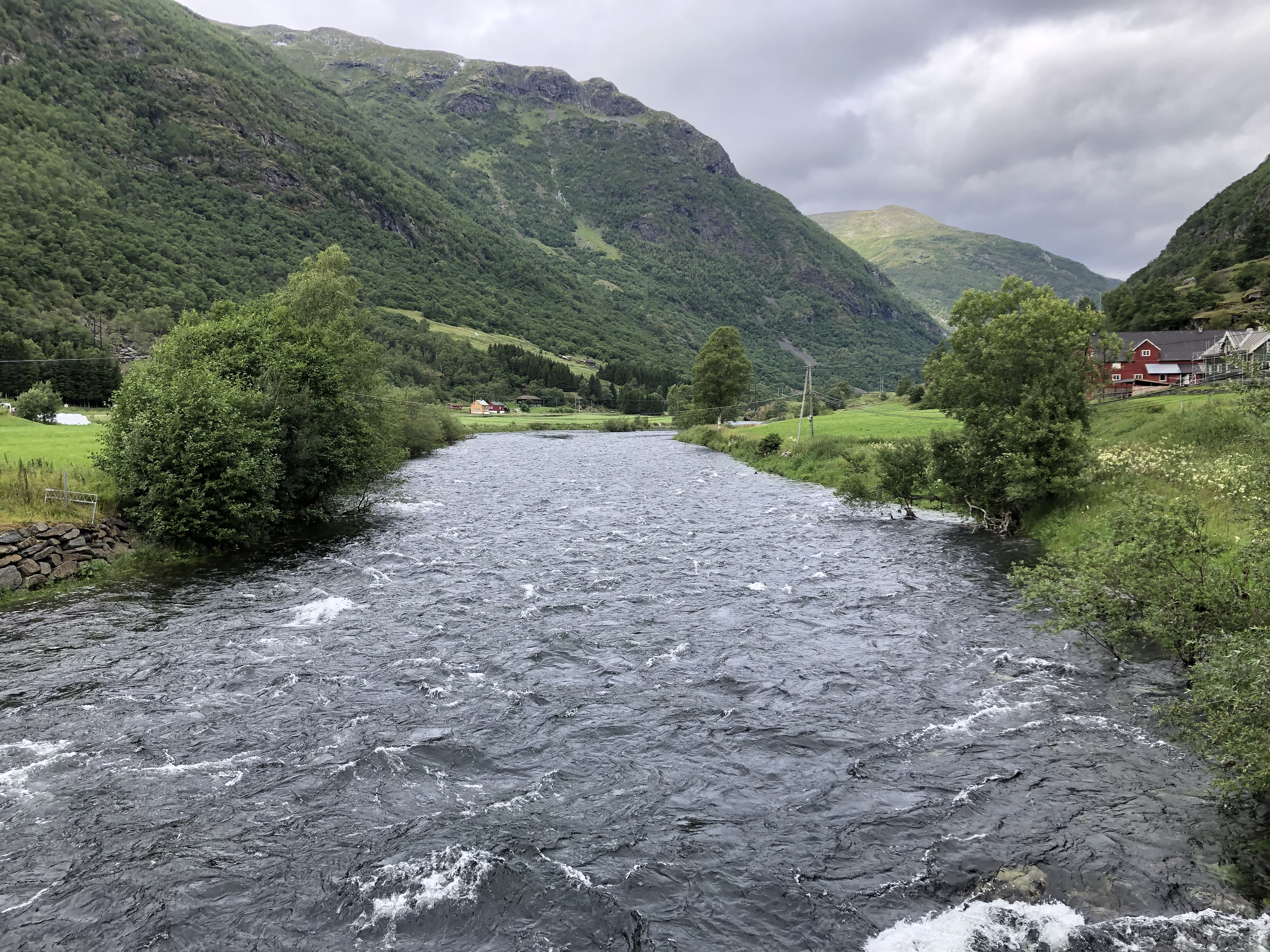
View of the river

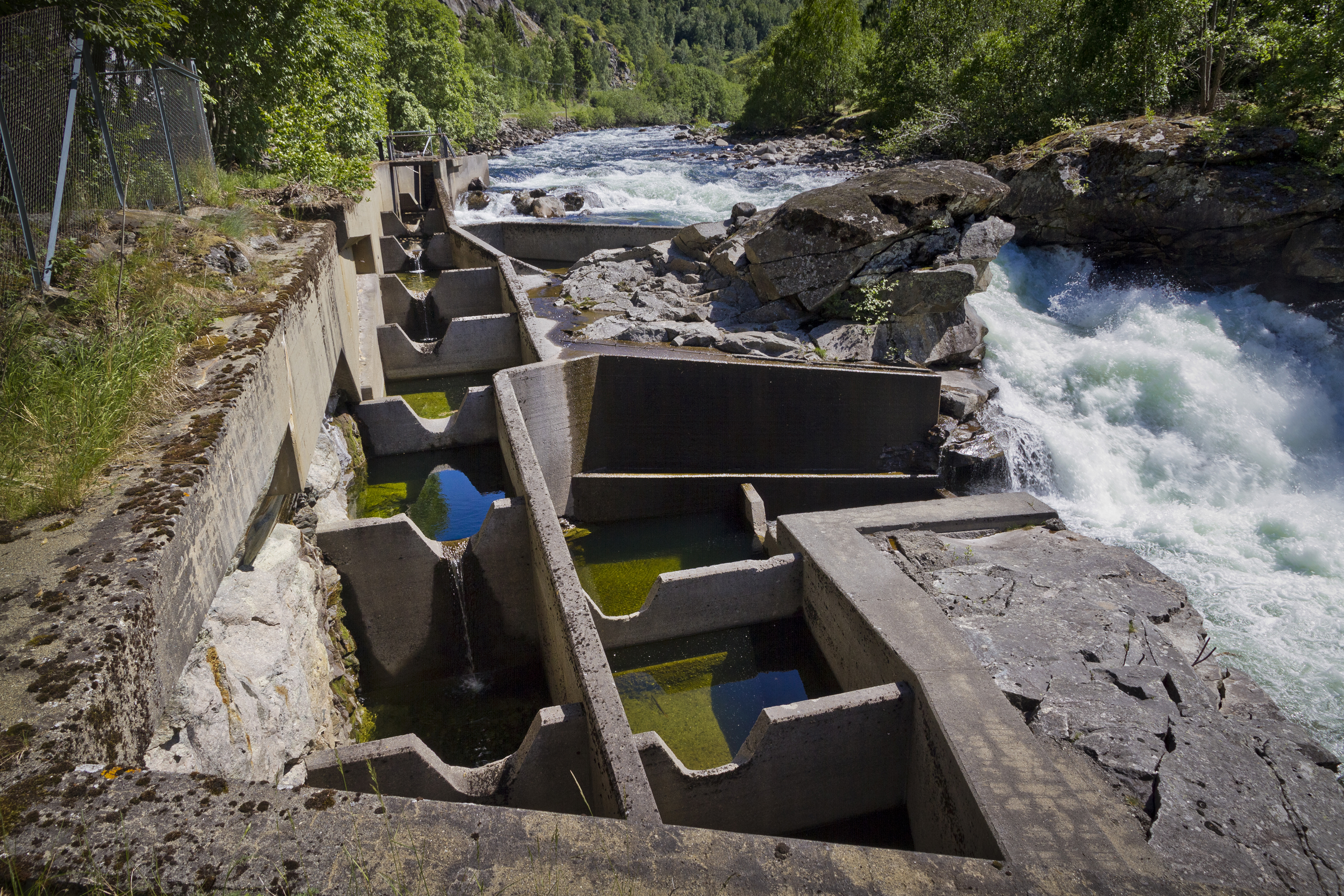
Salmon ladder near Husum

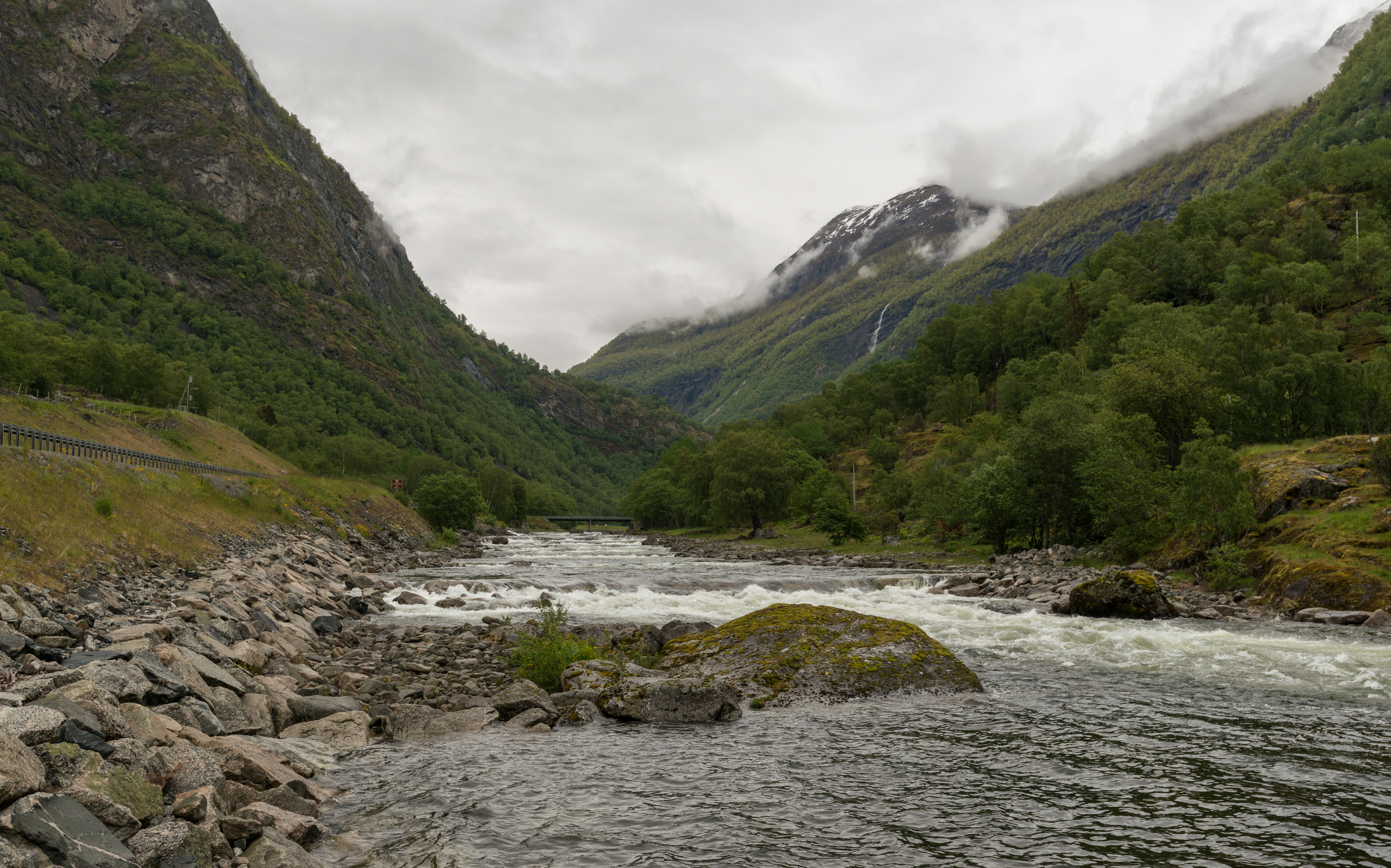
View of the river

== Salmon fishing ==
The lower 25 kilometres (16 mi) of the river is calm with large pools. This stretch of river is known as one of the best sport fishing rivers in the country. The fishing for salmon and sea trout there is known all over the world. The Norwegian Wild Salmon Center has an observatory of wild salmon in the river. The observatory provides insight into the occurrence and life cycle of the Atlantic salmon and the traditions surrounding salmon fishing. The upper part of the Lærdalselvi is steep with many rapids and waterfalls.

The average size of salmon caught in the Lærdalselvi is 6.5 kilograms (14 lb) and of sea trout is 1.5 kilograms (3.3 lb). In the years 2004–2013, an average of 458 salmon were caught each year. In 2013, 900 salmon were landed, which corresponds to a normal season. A total of 978 salmon were caught in the river in 2014, of which 484 salmon weighed over 7 kilograms (15 lb). In August 2014, a male salmon weighing between 26.4 to 27.5 kilograms (58 to 61 lb) was landed in the Old Pastor pond. In 2019, 584 kilograms (1,287 lb) of sea trout were caught, of which half were released. Fishing has declined in recent years. In 2020, 600 salmon and 400 sea trout were caught. Since 2020, the river has been closed to salmon fishing. Due to little snow and extremely little precipitation in 2021, there was low water flow and only a few sea trout were caught.

Cultivation of the salmon stock requires minimum water flow and the possibility of releasing water past the hydroelectric turbines during shutdowns. A separate hatchery for salmon and trout is close to Stuvane power plant ensures a secure supply of seiners to the waterway.

=== Parasite ===
In the years from 1997 to 2016, the fish in the river were attacked by disease. The salmon parasite Gyrodactylus salaris first appeared in Lærdalselvi in 1997. Treatment with rotenone was carried out the same year, but the gyro appeared again in October 1999.

In 2005, the river was acidified with aluminium sulfate and a fishing ban was introduced from 2008 to 2011. In 2011 to 2012, the river was treated again with aluminum sulfate. At the beginning of the 2016 season, the fish were very good and the river was declared healthy in 2017. DNA studies of salmon scales collected over 40 years show that disease and regulation have not caused any genetic changes in the salmon in the river.

== Hydroelectricity ==
The development of hydroelectric power in the Lærdalselvi watershed took place in stages in the years from 1971 to 1988. The waterway was developed in 1972 above the Sjurhaugfossen waterfall, which is the highest point to which the salmon can swim to. The total average annual production in the Lærdalselvi watershed is 1,267 gigawatt-hours (4,560 TJ).

The Borgund power station produces 186 megawatts (249,000 hp) and 1,034 gigawatt-hours (3,720 TJ) and it utilizes tributaries from the south; including Dilma and Nivla, with a head of 874 metres (2,867 ft). Øljusjøen pumped storage power station produces 50 megawatts (67,000 hp)) of power. It is used in the summer to pump water from the main collection tunnel for the Borgund power station at 1,100 metres (3,600 ft) above sea level to storage in Øljusjøen at 1,333–1,307 metres (4,373–4,288 ft) above sea level. In winter, this water is utilized and the inflow from the above catchment area is used in both power stations. In winter, the head from Borgund to Stuvane is utilized for power production in Stuvane power station which produces 38 megawatts (51,000 hp) and 190 gigawatt-hours (680 TJ), which has a head of 162 metres (531 ft).

== See also ==
- List of rivers in Norway
