= Knut Rumohr =

Norwegian painter and printmaker (1916–2002)

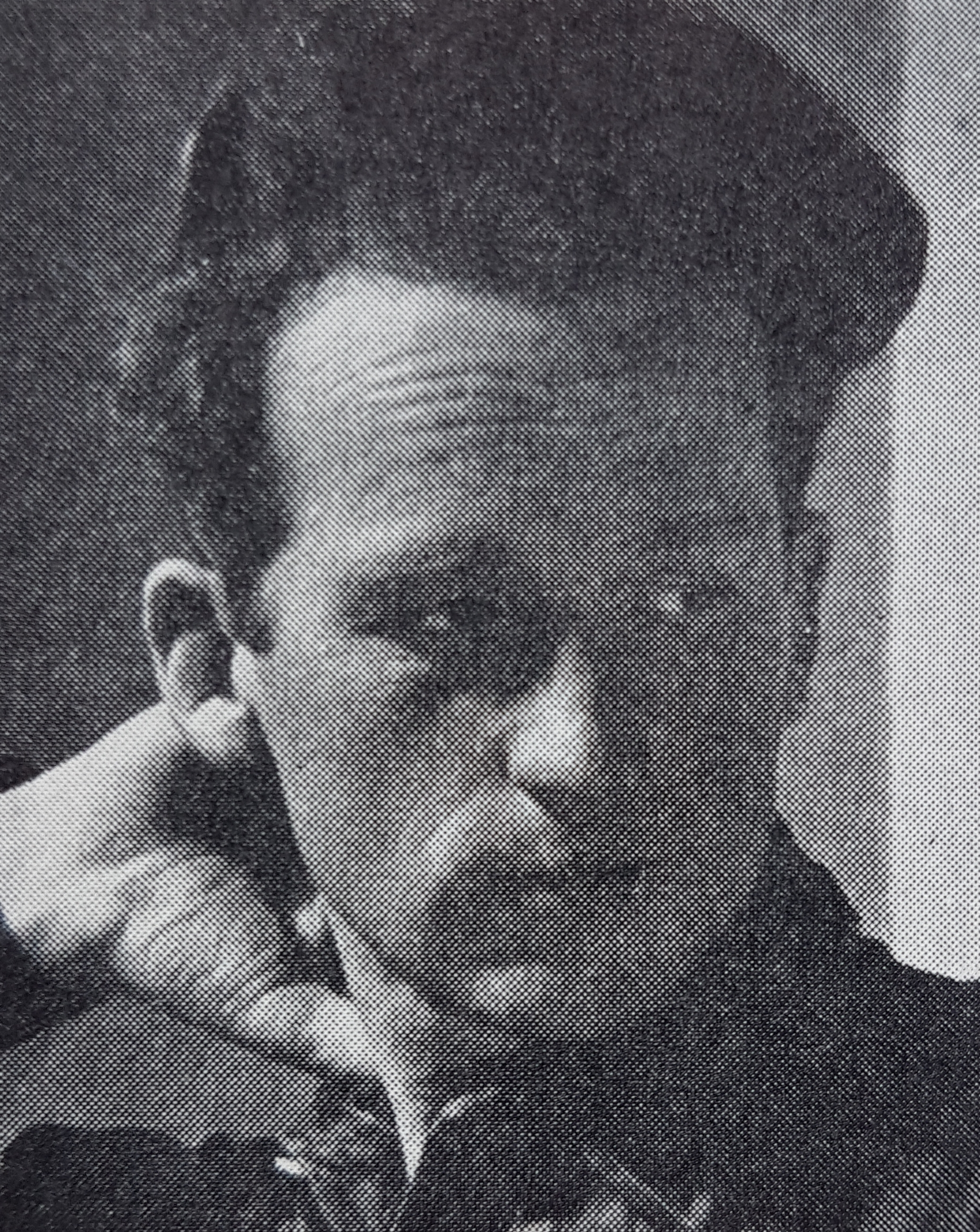
Knut Rumohr

Knut Lindstrøm Rumohr (21 December 1916 – 31 October 2002) was a Norwegian painter and printmaker.

== Biography ==
Rumohr was born at Frønningen in Leikanger Municipality (the area is now part of Lærdal Municipality) in Nordre Bergenhus county, Norway. He was the son of Johan Rumohr (1886–1981) and Liv Lindstrøm (1887–1919). He was raised at Frønningen Manor (Frønningen-godset), an historic estate which was owned by his family.

He graduated from Bergen kunsthåndverkskole in 1934. He trained at the Norwegian National Academy of Fine Arts in Oslo under Per Krohg and Olaf Willums from 1935 to 1941 and under Jean Heiberg and Georg Jacobsen from 1938 to 1941. He was awarded the Houens legat in 1945 and the Henrichsens legat in 1953. He utilized travel grants to continue his studies in Sweden and Denmark during 1946 as well as France and Italy from 1947 to 1949. Rumohr debuted as a graphic artist at the Autumn Exhibition (Høstutstillingen) at Oslo in 1939.

He has decorated several public buildings, and illustrated books, such as the novel Arbeidsfolk by Alexander Kielland. Among his paintings are Forsommer from 1962 and Landskap from 1963, which both are represented at the National Gallery of Norway.
