= Knut Aarethun =

Norwegian politician (born 1942)

Knut O. Aarethun
- Born: 19 January 1942 (age 84); Lærdalsøyri, Norway
- Occupation: Politician

Knut O. Aarethun (born 19 January 1942) is a Norwegian politician for the Labour Party.

From 1964, he worked in the administration of the Lærdal hospital in his native Lærdalsøyri. In 1967, he was elected to the municipal council for Lærdal Municipality. He was later elected to the Sogn og Fjordane county council, first time in 1981. He became deputy county mayor in 1991, and then county mayor in 1995. He lost his post following the 1999 elections. From 2003 to 2007 he served as mayor of Lærdal Municipality.

Political offices
| Preceded by Sjur Hopperstad | County mayor of Sogn og Fjordane; 1995–1999 | Succeeded by Nils R. Sandal |
