= Lærdal Municipality =

Municipality in Vestland, Norway

Lærdal Municipality Lærdal kommune
- Municipality
- Leirdal herred (historic name)
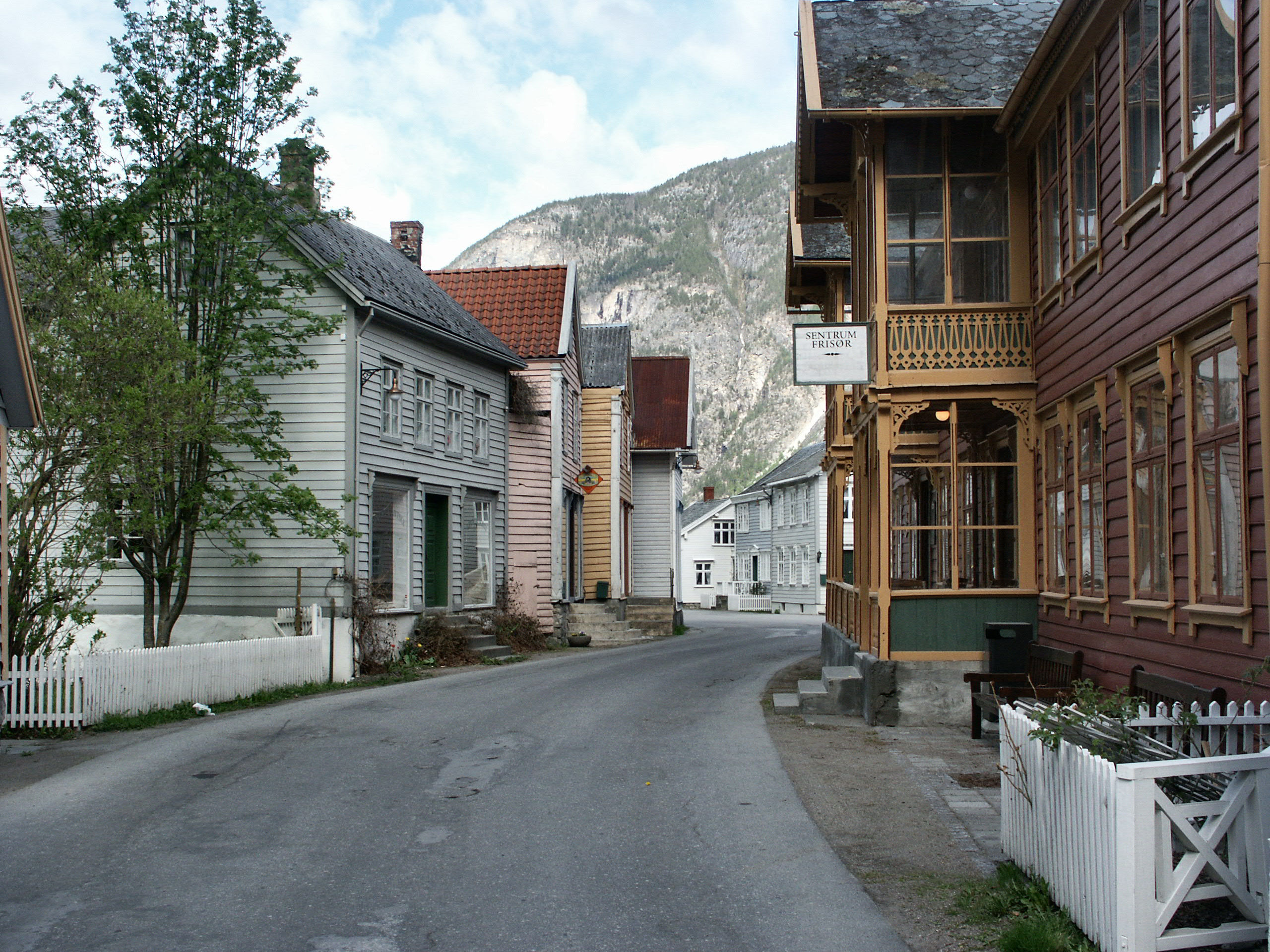
- View of Lærdalsøyri

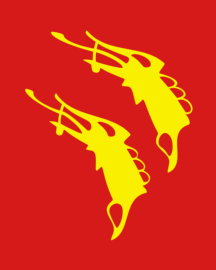
- Flag Coat of arms

- Vestland within Norway

- Lærdal within Vestland
- Coordinates: 61°03′04″N 07°35′52″E
- Country: Norway
- County: Vestland
- District: Sogn
- Established: 1 Jan 1838
  - Created as: Formannskapsdistrikt
- Administrative centre: Lærdalsøyri

Government
  - Mayor (2019): Audun Mo (Ap)

Area
  - Total: 1,342.52 km^{2} (518.35 sq mi)
  - Land: 1,275.43 km^{2} (492.45 sq mi)
  - Water: 67.09 km^{2} (25.90 sq mi) 5%
  - Rank: #71 in Norway
- Highest elevation: 1,920.23 m (6,300.0 ft)

Population (2025)
  - Total: 2,188
  - Rank: #272 in Norway
  - Density: 1.6/km^{2} (4.1/sq mi)
  - Change (10 years): ▼ −0.6%
- Demonym: Lærdøl

Official language
  - Norwegian form: Nynorsk
- Time zone: UTC+01:00 (CET)
  - Summer (DST): UTC+02:00 (CEST)
- ISO 3166 code: NO-4642
- Website: Official website

Lærdal is a municipality in Vestland county, Norway. It is located on the south side of the Sognefjorden in the traditional district of Sogn. The administrative center of the municipality is the village of Lærdalsøyri. The old Filefjell Kongevegen road passes through Lærdal Municipality on its way to Valdres and later to Oslo.

The 1,342.52-square-kilometre (518.35 sq mi) municipality is the 71st largest by area out of the 357 municipalities in Norway (with over half of this area consisting of mountains). Lærdal Municipality is the 272nd most populous municipality in Norway with a population of 2,188. The municipality's population density is 1.6 inhabitants per square kilometre (4.1/sq mi) and its population has decreased by 0.5% over the previous 10-year period.

The Lærdal river valley is long, running from Hemsedal Municipality (Høgeloft mountain) and the Filefjell mountains in the east to the Sognefjorden in the west. About half of the municipal residents live in the main village of Lærdalsøyri; the rest in the small villages in the surrounding valleys such as Borgund, Ljøsne, Tønjum, Erdal, Vindedalen, Frønningen, and Strendene. The Old Lærdalsøyri village has 161 protected buildings. Some of the houses there date back to the mid-18th century. On the night of 18–19 January 2014, a major fire destroyed at least 30 buildings.

== General information ==
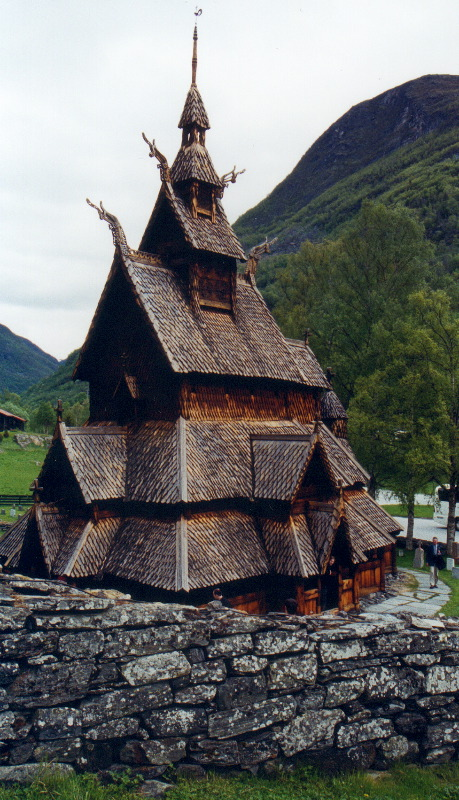
Borgund stave church

The parish of Lærdal was established as a municipality on 1 January 1838 (see formannskapsdistrikt law). In the 19th century, the name was sometimes spelled Leerdahl or Leirdal. The municipality of 1838 was created to be identical to the Church of Norway's Lærdal prestegjeld which included the parishes (sokn) of Borgund, Tønjum, Hauge, and Aardal.

In 1863, the northeastern parish of Aardal (population: 1,791) was separated from Lærdal Municipality to form the new Aardal Municipality. In 1864, the eastern parish of Borgund (population: 963) was separated from Lærdal Municipality to form the new Borgund Municipality. These changes left Lærdal Municipality with 2,777 residents, and a much smaller size.

During the 1960s, there were many municipal mergers across Norway due to the work of the Schei Committee. On 1 January 1964, the following areas were merged to create a much larger Lærdal Municipality (population after the merger: 2,258):

- all of Lærdal Municipality (population: 1,755)
- all of Borgund Municipality (population: 492)
- the Muggeteigen, Luggenes, and Bergmål farms (population: 11) along the Sognefjorden from Årdal Municipality.

On 1 January 1992, the Frønningen area (population: 32) of Leikanger Municipality was transferred to Lærdal Municipality.

Historically, this municipality was part of the old Sogn og Fjordane county. On 1 January 2020, the municipality became a part of the newly-formed Vestland county (after Hordaland and Sogn og Fjordane counties were merged).

=== Name ===
The municipality (originally the parish) is named after the old village of Lærdal (Old Norse: Lærardalr). The first element is the genitive case of the old name of the local river Lærr. The meaning of the river name is unknown. The last element is dalr which means "valley" or "dale".

=== Coat of arms ===
The coat of arms was granted on 18 December 1987. The official blazon is "Gules, two dragon heads bendwise Or" (Norwegian: På raud grunn to gull drakehovud i skrå rekkje). This means the arms have a red field (background) and the charge is two dragon heads aligned diagonally. The charge has a tincture of Or which means it is commonly colored yellow, but if it is made out of metal, then gold is used. The dragon heads are based on the wooden dragons seen on the gables of the historic Borgund Stave Church that was built around 1150 in Lærdal. The arms were designed by Inge Rotevatn. The municipal flag has the same design as the coat of arms.

=== Churches ===
The Church of Norway has three parishes (sokn) within Lærdal Municipality. It is part of the Sogn prosti (deanery) in the Diocese of Bjørgvin.

Churches in Lærdal Municipality
Parish (sokn)	Church name	Location of the church	Year built
Borgund	Borgund Church	Borgund	1868
Borgund	Borgund Stave Church	Borgund	c. 1150
Hauge	Hauge Church	Lærdalsøyri	1868
Tønjum	Tønjum Church	Tønjum	1832

== Government ==
Lærdal Municipality is responsible for primary education (through 10th grade), outpatient health services, senior citizen services, welfare and other social services, zoning, economic development, and municipal roads and utilities. The municipality is governed by a municipal council of directly elected representatives. The mayor is indirectly elected by a vote of the municipal council. The municipality is under the jurisdiction of the Sogn og Fjordane District Court and the Gulating Court of Appeal.

=== Municipal council ===
The municipal council (Kommunestyre) of Lærdal Municipality is made up of 17 representatives that are elected to four year terms. The tables below show the current and historical composition of the council by political party.

Lærdal kommunestyre 2023–2027
Party name (in Nynorsk)	Number of representatives
Labour Party (Arbeidarpartiet)	9
Conservative Party (Høgre)	1
Centre Party (Senterpartiet)	5
Socialist Left Party (Sosialistisk Venstreparti)	2
Total number of members:	17

Lærdal kommunestyre 2019–2023
Party name (in Nynorsk)	Number of representatives
Labour Party (Arbeidarpartiet)	8
Conservative Party (Høgre)	2
Centre Party (Senterpartiet)	5
Socialist Left Party (Sosialistisk Venstreparti)	2
Total number of members:	17

Lærdal kommunestyre 2015–2019
Party name (in Nynorsk)	Number of representatives
Labour Party (Arbeidarpartiet)	5
Conservative Party (Høgre)	2
Centre Party (Senterpartiet)	8
Socialist Left Party (Sosialistisk Venstreparti)	1
Liberal Party (Venstre)	1
Total number of members:	17

Lærdal kommunestyre 2011–2015
Party name (in Nynorsk)	Number of representatives
Labour Party (Arbeidarpartiet)	4
Conservative Party (Høgre)	3
Centre Party (Senterpartiet)	5
Socialist Left Party (Sosialistisk Venstreparti)	3
Liberal Party (Venstre)	2
Total number of members:	17

Lærdal kommunestyre 2007–2011
Party name (in Nynorsk)	Number of representatives
Labour Party (Arbeidarpartiet)	7
Conservative Party (Høgre)	2
Centre Party (Senterpartiet)	5
Socialist Left Party (Sosialistisk Venstreparti)	2
Liberal Party (Venstre)	1
Total number of members:	17

Lærdal kommunestyre 2003–2007
Party name (in Nynorsk)	Number of representatives
Labour Party (Arbeidarpartiet)	8
Progress Party (Framstegspartiet)	1
Socialist Left Party (Sosialistisk Venstreparti)	3
Joint list of the Conservative Party (Høgre), Christian Democratic Party (Kristeleg Folkeparti), Centre Party (Senterpartiet), and Liberal Party (Venstre)	5
Total number of members:	17

Lærdal kommunestyre 1999–2003
Party name (in Nynorsk)	Number of representatives
Labour Party (Arbeidarpartiet)	9
Socialist Left Party (Sosialistisk Venstreparti)	2
Joint list of the Conservative Party (Høgre), Christian Democratic Party (Kristeleg Folkeparti), Centre Party (Senterpartiet), and Liberal Party (Venstre)	10
Total number of members:	21

Lærdal kommunestyre 1995–1999
Party name (in Nynorsk)	Number of representatives
Labour Party (Arbeidarpartiet)	10
Socialist Left Party (Sosialistisk Venstreparti)	1
Joint list of the Conservative Party (Høgre), Christian Democratic Party (Kristeleg Folkeparti), Centre Party (Senterpartiet), and Liberal Party (Venstre)	10
Total number of members:	21

Lærdal kommunestyre 1991–1995
Party name (in Nynorsk)	Number of representatives
Labour Party (Arbeidarpartiet)	8
Socialist Left Party (Sosialistisk Venstreparti)	2
Joint list of the Conservative Party (Høgre), Christian Democratic Party (Kristeleg Folkeparti), Centre Party (Senterpartiet), and Liberal Party (Venstre)	11
Total number of members:	21

Lærdal kommunestyre 1987–1991
Party name (in Nynorsk)	Number of representatives
Labour Party (Arbeidarpartiet)	10
Conservative Party (Høgre)	4
Joint list of the Centre Party (Senterpartiet), Christian Democratic Party (Kristeleg Folkeparti), and Liberal Party (Venstre)	7
Total number of members:	21

Lærdal kommunestyre 1983–1987
Party name (in Nynorsk)	Number of representatives
Labour Party (Arbeidarpartiet)	10
Conservative Party (Høgre)	3
Joint list of the Centre Party (Senterpartiet), Christian Democratic Party (Kristeleg Folkeparti), and Liberal Party (Venstre)	8
Total number of members:	21

Lærdal kommunestyre 1979–1983
Party name (in Nynorsk)	Number of representatives
Labour Party (Arbeidarpartiet)	9
Joint list of the Conservative Party (Høgre), Christian Democratic Party (Kristeleg Folkeparti), New People's Party (Nye Folkepartiet), Centre Party (Senterpartiet), and Liberal Party (Venstre)	12
Total number of members:	21

Lærdal kommunestyre 1975–1979
Party name (in Nynorsk)	Number of representatives
Labour Party (Arbeidarpartiet)	10
Joint list of the Conservative Party (Høgre), Centre Party (Senterpartiet), Liberal Party (Venstre), and New People's Party (Nye Folkepartiet)	11
Total number of members:	21

Lærdal kommunestyre 1971–1975
Party name (in Nynorsk)	Number of representatives
Labour Party (Arbeidarpartiet)	12
Conservative Party (Høgre)	2
Centre Party (Senterpartiet)	6
Liberal Party (Venstre)	1
Total number of members:	21

Lærdal kommunestyre 1967–1971
Party name (in Nynorsk)	Number of representatives
Labour Party (Arbeidarpartiet)	12
Conservative Party (Høgre)	1
Centre Party (Senterpartiet)	6
Liberal Party (Venstre)	2
Total number of members:	21

Lærdal kommunestyre 1963–1967
Party name (in Nynorsk)	Number of representatives
Labour Party (Arbeidarpartiet)	11
Conservative Party (Høgre)	2
Centre Party (Senterpartiet)	6
Liberal Party (Venstre)	2
Total number of members:	21
Note: On 1 January 1964, Borgund Municipality became part of Lærdal Municipality.

Lærdal heradsstyre 1959–1963
Party name (in Nynorsk)	Number of representatives
Labour Party (Arbeidarpartiet)	9
Conservative Party (Høgre)	2
Centre Party (Senterpartiet)	7
Liberal Party (Venstre)	3
Total number of members:	21

Lærdal heradsstyre 1955–1959
Party name (in Nynorsk)	Number of representatives
Labour Party (Arbeidarpartiet)	8
Conservative Party (Høgre)	1
Liberal Party (Venstre)	4
Local List(s) (Lokale lister)	8
Total number of members:	21

Lærdal heradsstyre 1951–1955
Party name (in Nynorsk)	Number of representatives
Labour Party (Arbeidarpartiet)	10
Liberal Party (Venstre)	5
Joint List(s) of Non-Socialist Parties (Borgarlege Felleslister)	9
Total number of members:	24

Lærdal heradsstyre 1947–1951
Party name (in Nynorsk)	Number of representatives
Labour Party (Arbeidarpartiet)	9
Joint List(s) of Non-Socialist Parties (Borgarlege Felleslister)	15
Total number of members:	24

Lærdal heradsstyre 1945–1947
Party name (in Nynorsk)	Number of representatives
Labour Party (Arbeidarpartiet)	10
Liberal Party (Venstre)	3
Joint List(s) of Non-Socialist Parties (Borgarlege Felleslister)	11
Total number of members:	24

Lærdal heradsstyre 1937–1941*
Party name (in Nynorsk)	Number of representatives
Labour Party (Arbeidarpartiet)	7
Farmers' Party (Bondepartiet)	9
Liberal Party (Venstre)	5
Local List(s) (Lokale lister)	3
Total number of members:	24
Note: Due to the German occupation of Norway during World War II, no elections were held for new municipal councils until after the war ended in 1945.

=== Mayors ===
The mayor (Nynorsk: ordførar) of Lærdal Municipality is the political leader of the municipality and the chairperson of the municipal council. Here is a list of people who have held this position:

- 1838–1843: Nils Rossing Bull
- 1844–1845: Jan Henrik Nitter Hansen
- 1846–1847: Hannibal Winsnes
- 1848–1857: Nils Rossing Bull
- 1858–1859: Jan Rumohr
- 1860–1863: Jørgen Christian Lindstrøm
- 1864–1871: Jan Rumohr
- 1872–1875: Søren Schelderup
- 1876–1877: David Anderson Raa
- 1878–1879: Baard Lysne
- 1880–1881: Tøger Ravn
- 1882–1888: Otto Blehr
- 1889–1891: Peder Th. Tønjum
- 1896–1898: Gerhard Dahl
- 1899–1901: Tøger Ravn
- 1908–1910: Hans H. Michelsen
- 1911–1913: Haakon Mo
- 1914–1916: Hans H. Michelsen
- 1917–1922: Olav Skjær
- 1923–1925: Nils Lysne
- 1926–1937: Olav Skjær
- 1938–1942: Per Severin Hjermann (Bp)
- 1942–1945: Petter Klingenberg (NS)
- 1945–1954: Per Severin Hjermann (Bp)
- 1954–1959: Egil Natvik (V)
- 1960–1963: Ingebrigt Eri (Sp)
- 1964–1975: Anders Lunden (Ap)
- 1976–1979: Per Hjermann (Sp)
- 1980–1981: Knut L. Blaaflat (Sp)
- 1982–1989: Knut O. Hegg (Sp)
- 1990–1999: Hans A. Tønjum (Sp)
- 1999–2003: Olav Wendelbo (Sp)
- 2003–2007: Knut O. Aarethun (Ap)
- 2007–2011: Arne Sanden (Ap)
- 2011–2019: Jan Geir Solheim (Sp)
- 2019–present: Audun Mo (Ap)

=== Twin towns – Sister cities ===
Lærdal has sister city agreements with the following places:

- Jericho, Palestine (since 1998)

== Geography ==
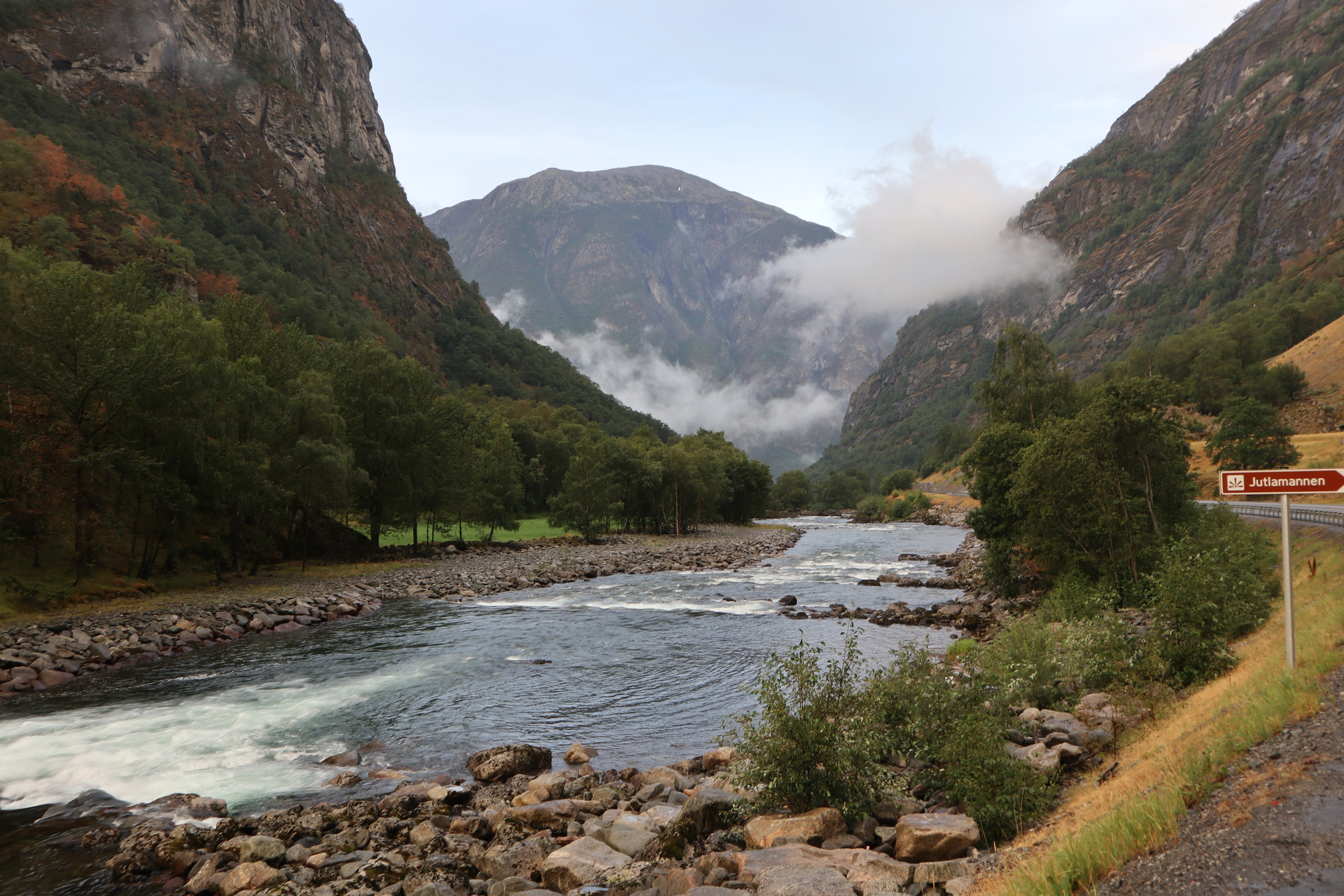
The river near Jutlamannen

Lærdal Municipality is located southeast of the Sognefjorden and east of the Aurlandsfjorden. The municipality is centered on the Lærdalselvi River with the Filefjell and Hemsedalsfjell mountain ranges on its east. Lærdal Municipality is bordered in Vestland county by Aurland Municipality to the southwest, Sogndal Municipality to the northwest, and Årdal Municipality to the north. It is also bordered on the east by Vang Municipality (Innlandet county) and Hemsedal Municipality (Buskerud county), and in the south by Ål Municipality and Hol Municipality (both in Buskerud county).

The lakes Eldrevatnet, Juklevatnet, and Øljusjøen are located along the southeastern border. The highest point in the municipality is the 1,920.23-metre (6,300.0 ft) tall mountain Høgeloft on the eastern border with Hemsedal Municipality.

=== Climate ===
Lærdal Municipality is situated near the head of Sognefjorden. The very long fjord snakes past mountain ranges on its way from the sea inland to Lærdal, and the mountains create a rain shadow effect for the innermost part of the fjord, making Lærdal much drier than the coast, with just 20% of Bergen's precipitation. The mountains also sometimes gives a föhn effect in winter for Lærdal. The climate of Lærdal is a thus a mix of oceanic and continental features. Lærdal has a humid continental climate, or a temperate oceanic climate (Cfb), depending on winter threshold (0 °C (32 °F)or −3 °C (27 °F)). The record high 33.4 °C (92.1 °F) was recorded both July 2018 and July 2019. The all-time low −21.8 °C (−7.2 °F) is from January 1942.

Climate data for Lærdal 1991-2020 (2 m, Lærdal IV, extremes 1871-2020 includes earlier stations)
Month	Jan	Feb	Mar	Apr	May	Jun	Jul	Aug	Sep	Oct	Nov	Dec	Year
Record high °C (°F)	15.9 (60.6)	15.3 (59.5)	16.8 (62.2)	21.5 (70.7)	28.3 (82.9)	31 (88)	33.4 (92.1)	31 (88)	25.1 (77.2)	23.6 (74.5)	18.7 (65.7)	16.2 (61.2)	33.4 (92.1)
Mean daily maximum °C (°F)	1.5 (34.7)	2.0 (35.6)	5.8 (42.4)	11.1 (52.0)	15.5 (59.9)	19.1 (66.4)	21.3 (70.3)	19.7 (67.5)	15.3 (59.5)	9.2 (48.6)	4.7 (40.5)	2.0 (35.6)	10.6 (51.1)
Daily mean °C (°F)	−0.7 (30.7)	−0.7 (30.7)	2.3 (36.1)	6.4 (43.5)	10.2 (50.4)	13.6 (56.5)	15.9 (60.6)	14.8 (58.6)	10.9 (51.6)	5.9 (42.6)	2.2 (36.0)	−0.5 (31.1)	6.7 (44.0)
Mean daily minimum °C (°F)	−2.5 (27.5)	−2.7 (27.1)	−0.9 (30.4)	2.5 (36.5)	5.7 (42.3)	9.2 (48.6)	11.9 (53.4)	11.3 (52.3)	8.2 (46.8)	3.6 (38.5)	0.6 (33.1)	−1.8 (28.8)	3.8 (38.8)
Record low °C (°F)	−21.8 (−7.2)	−21.1 (−6.0)	−16.7 (1.9)	−8.8 (16.2)	−2.5 (27.5)	−0.6 (30.9)	3.3 (37.9)	2.8 (37.0)	−2.5 (27.5)	−10.5 (13.1)	−16.7 (1.9)	−19.4 (−2.9)	−21.8 (−7.2)
Average precipitation mm (inches)	45.8 (1.80)	25.8 (1.02)	32.1 (1.26)	27.3 (1.07)	29.6 (1.17)	43.7 (1.72)	50 (2.0)	57 (2.2)	55.3 (2.18)	49.3 (1.94)	44.7 (1.76)	47.5 (1.87)	508.1 (19.99)
Average precipitation days (≥ 1.0 mm)	9	8	7	5	7	9	9	10	11	9	8	8	100
Source 1: Norwegian Meteorological Institute/eklima (extremes) yr.no/met.no (means and precipitation)
Source 2: Weatheronline climate robot (average highs/lows)

=== Lærdal tunnel ===
The Lærdalstunnel was built through the Aurlandsfjellet mountains dividing Aurland Municipality from Lærdal Municipality. It is the world's longest road tunnel (as of 2020) at 24.5 kilometres (15.2 mi). Construction began in 1995 and was completed in 2000.

=== Lærdalselvi river ===
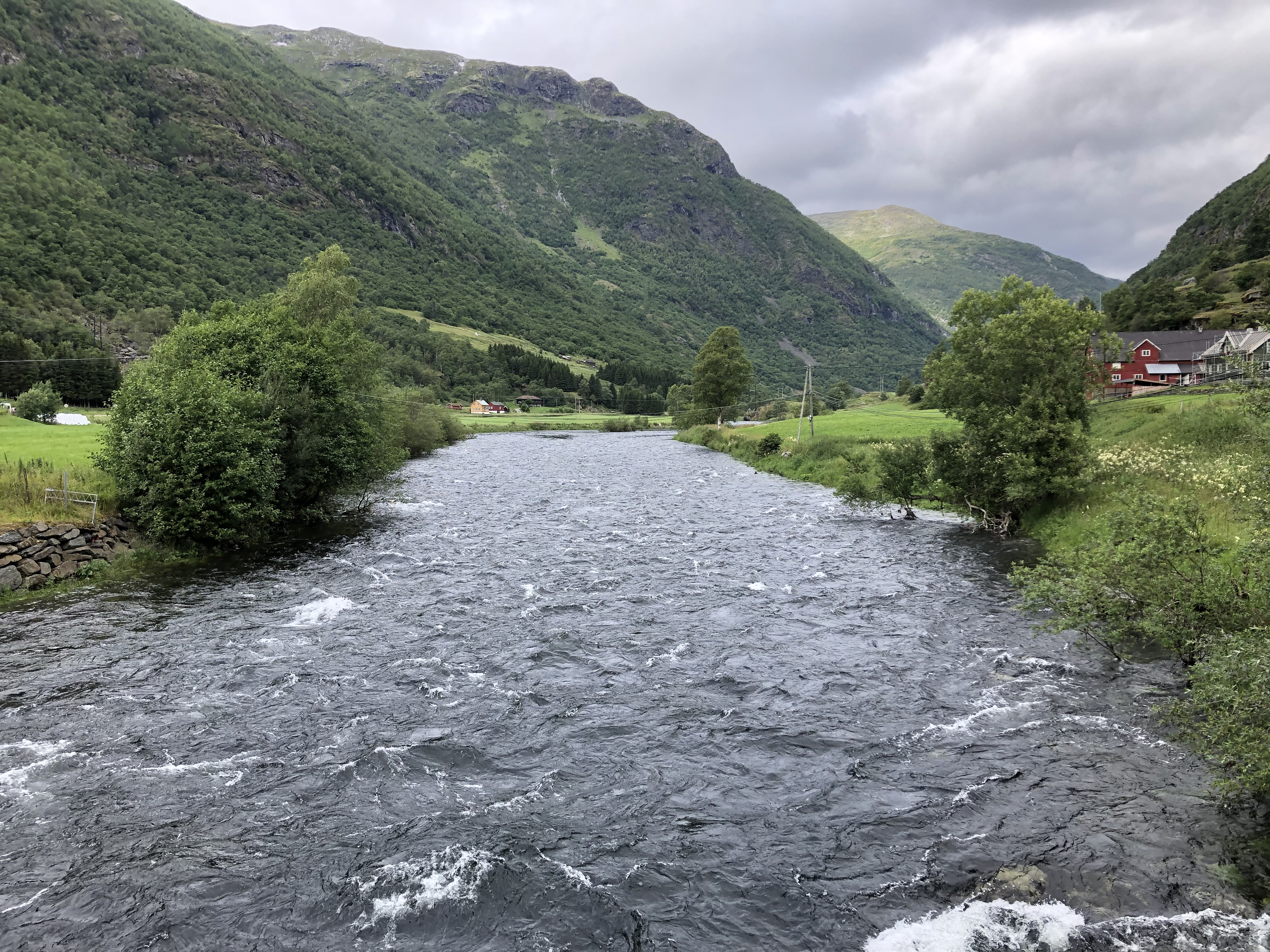
Lærdal river near Borgund Stave Church

The River Lærdalselvi was traditionally one of the most exclusive salmon and sea trout rivers in Norway. Known by the Norwegian King Harald V as his second Queen, the river has established Lærdal Municipality as one of the meccas of salmon and sea trout fly fishing, among others for the unusual fact that the river offers daylight fishing and dry fly fishing for sea trout. The salmon population was drastically depleted after an infestation with the salmon parasite Gyrodactylus salaris in the fall of 1996. After several treatments with aluminium sulfate, there are still problems with the parasite. In fall 2007, a smolt was again found infected by the parasite, and new treatments started in late March 2008. Because of this parasite, the river was closed to angling for the 2008 season.

The river has formed a large delta at Lærdalsøyri, where huge amounts of silt and sand have been deposited by the river. Although the area has been modified by some man-made landfills, it is still a sight worth seeing.

== Economy ==
Lærdal Municipality has long traditions in farming, with the lower region of the valley being great for vegetable crops. Because of its dry climate it was one of the first places in Norway to begin the use of artificial irrigation. Despite having an inland climate, the water in the fjord keeps the winters from getting too cold.

The local Western Norway Regional Health Authority hospital provides medical care for Lærdal itself and seven of the surrounding municipalities. The hospital, together with Opplysningen 1881 (directory assistance company), Østfold Energiproduksjon A/S and Norsk Hydro Aluminium Production Facilities in Årdal Municipality, are the major employers in Lærdal Municipality. The local government and health authority is trying to close this hospital due to cost cutting, which may have negative effects on the area.

== Notable people ==
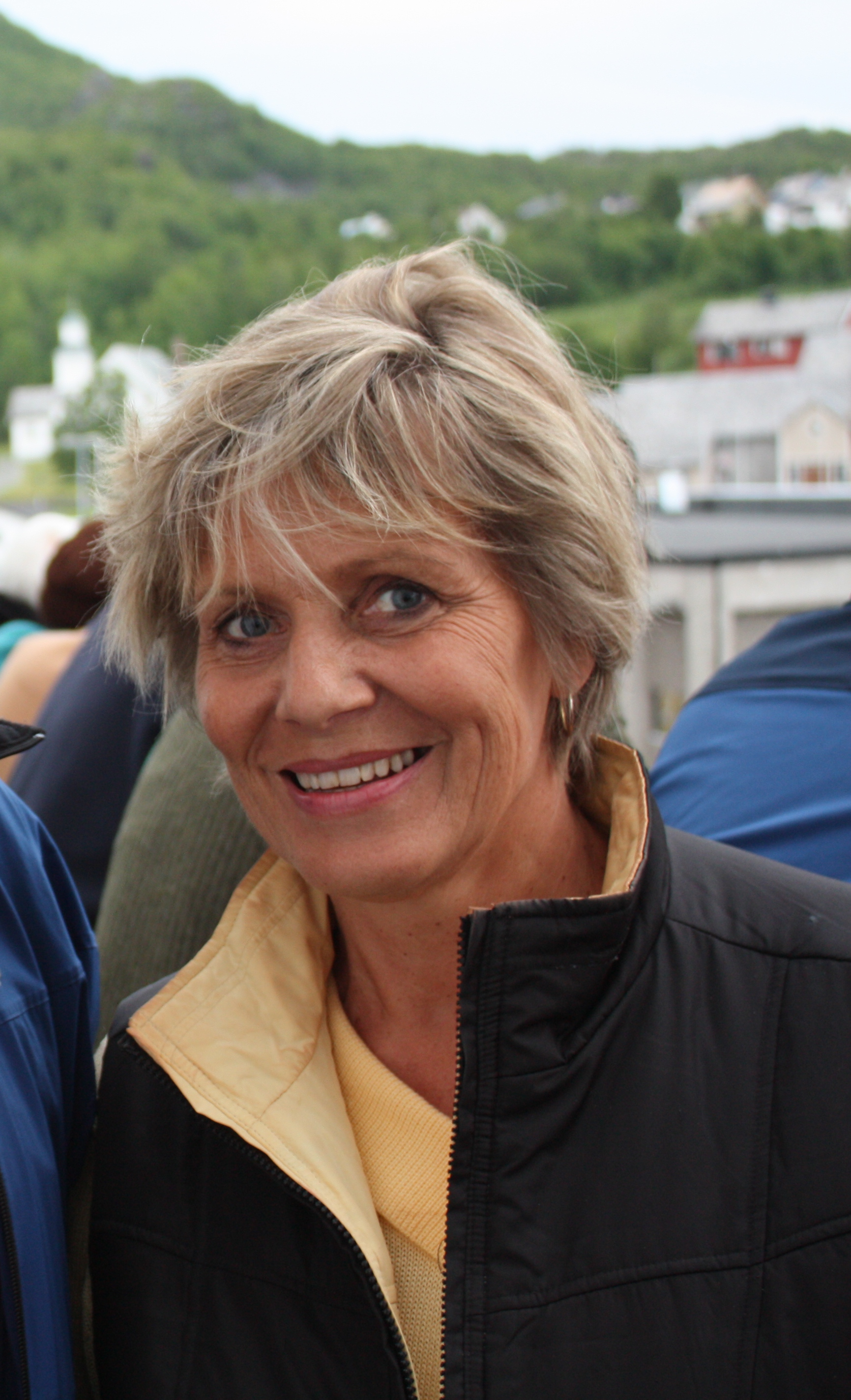
Ragnhild Sælthun Fjørtoft

- Peder Hjermann (1754 in Lærdal – 1834), a farmer and representative at the Norwegian Constitutional Assembly
- Anders Olson Lysne (1764 – executed 1803), a farmer who led the Lærdal farmers' rebellion from 1800 to 1802
- Jan Henrik Nitter Hansen (1801–1879), a businessman and politician who was mayor of Lærdal in the 1850s
- Per Lysne (1880 in Lærdal – 1947), a Norwegian-American artist who brought Rosemaling folk art to the USA
- Eivind Blehr (1881 in Lærdal – 1957), a politician who was a government minister in Quisling's government during WWII
- Knut Rumohr (1916 in Lærdal – 2002), a painter and printmaker
- Knut O. Aarethun (born 1942 in Lærdalsøyri), a politician who was mayor of Lærdal from 2003 to 2007
- Ragnhild Sælthun Fjørtoft (born 1947 in Lærdal), a former TV presenter
- Øyvind Hegg-Lunde (born 1982 in Lærdal), a musician (playing drums and percussion) who was raised in Borgund

== Photo gallery ==
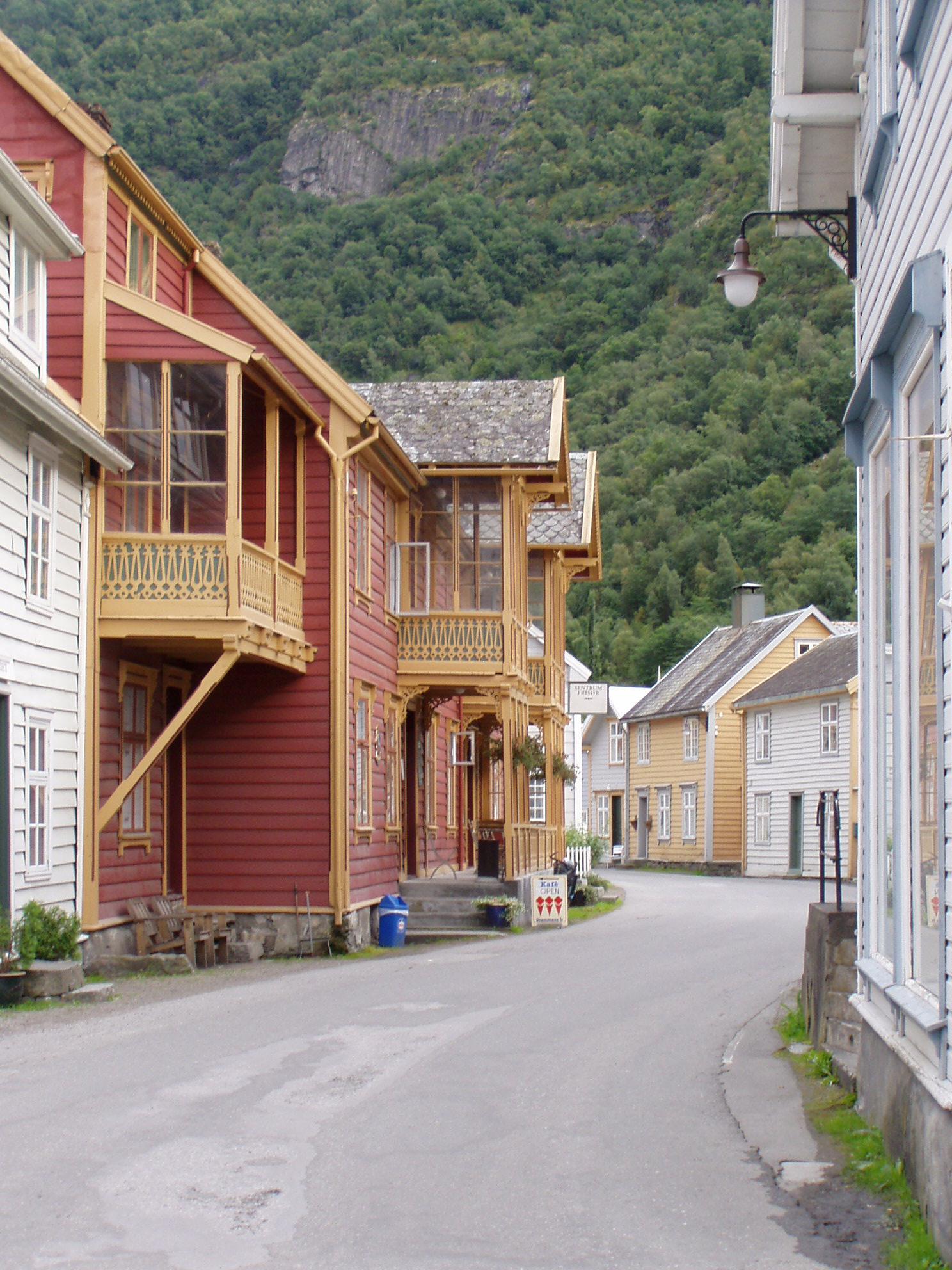
Lærdalsøyri

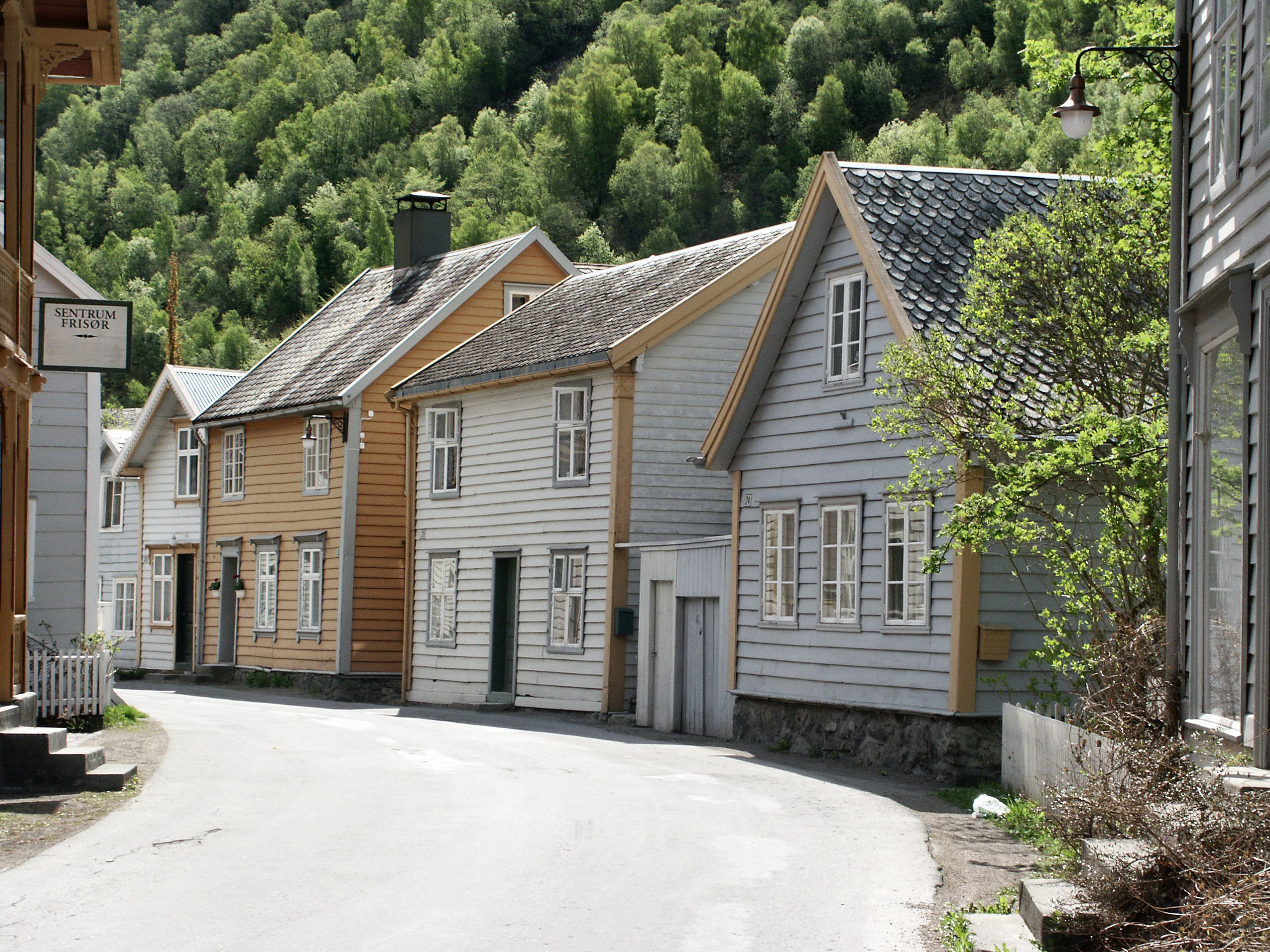
Lærdalsøyri

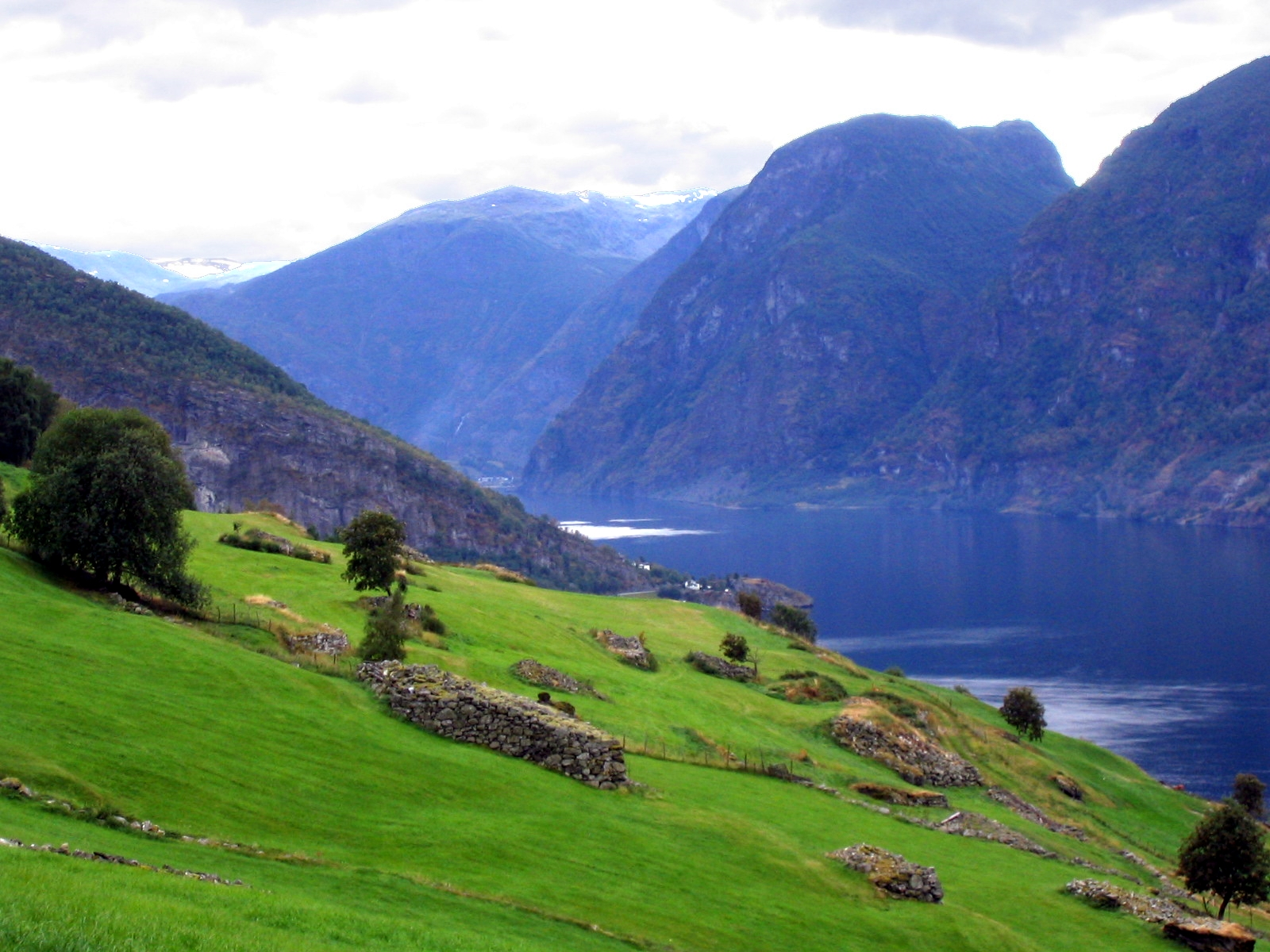
Old mountain pass from Aurland to Lærdal (above the Lærdalstunnelen)

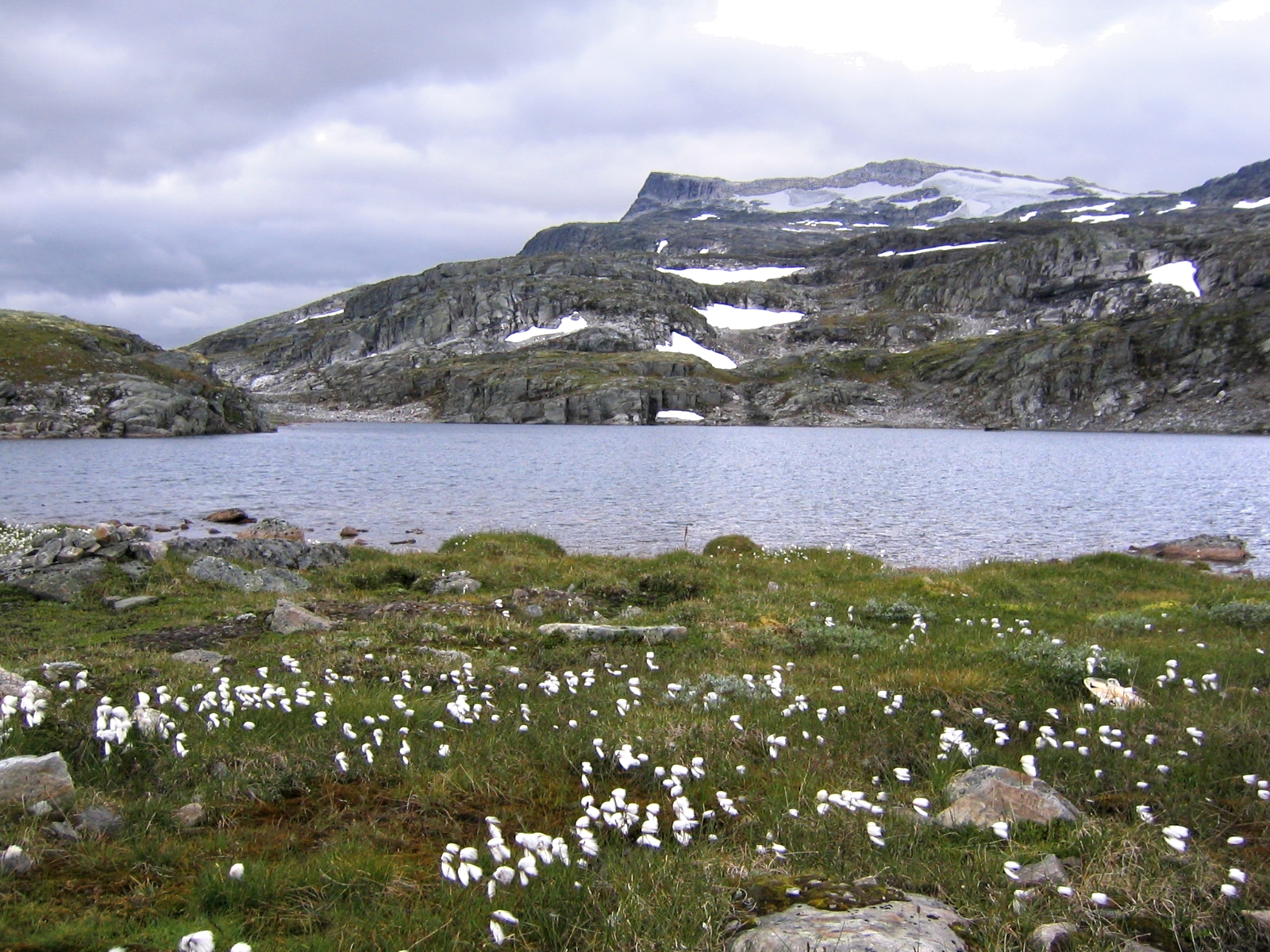
Old mountain pass from Aurland to Lærdal (above the Lærdalstunnelen)

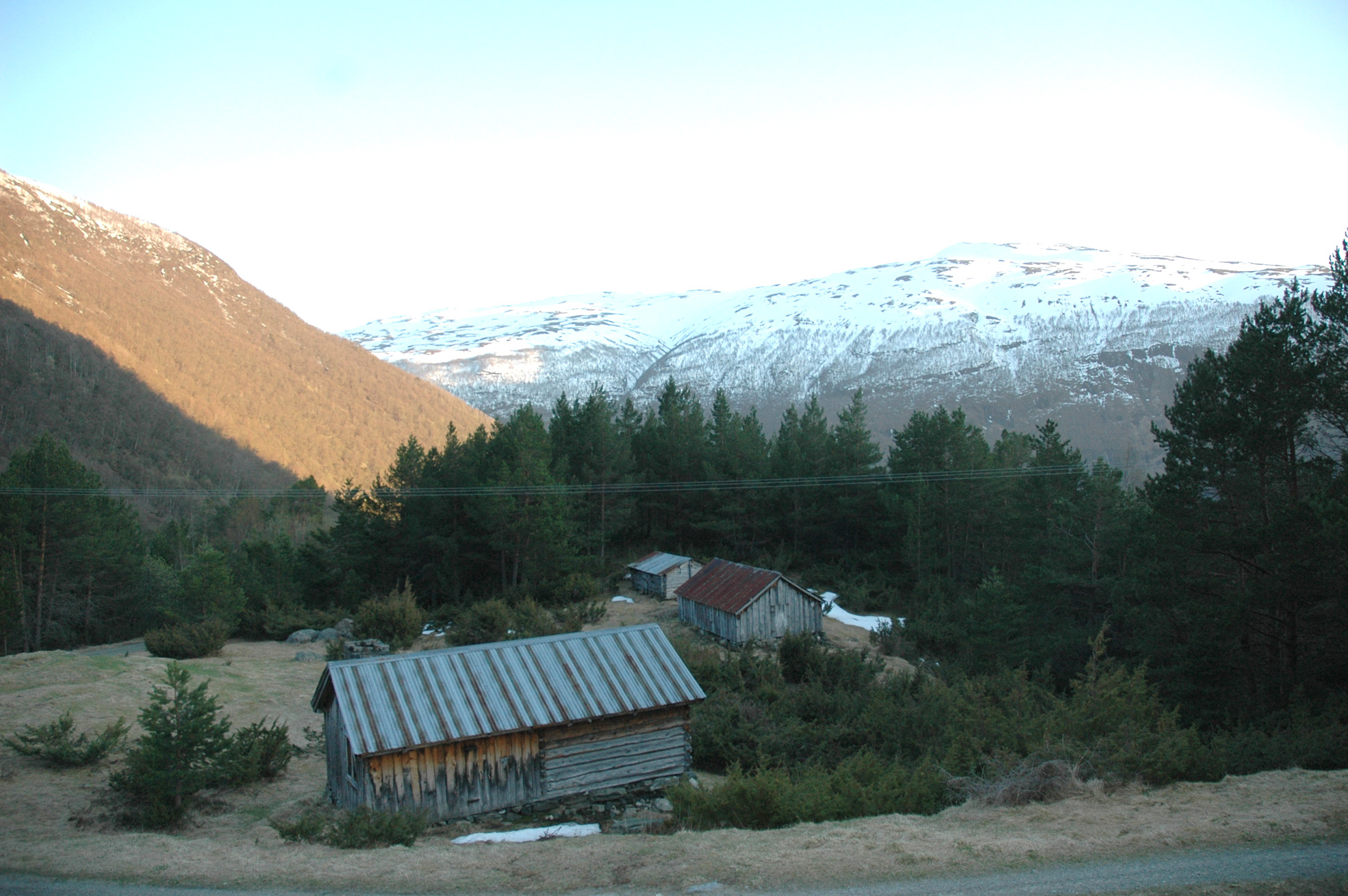
Lærdal

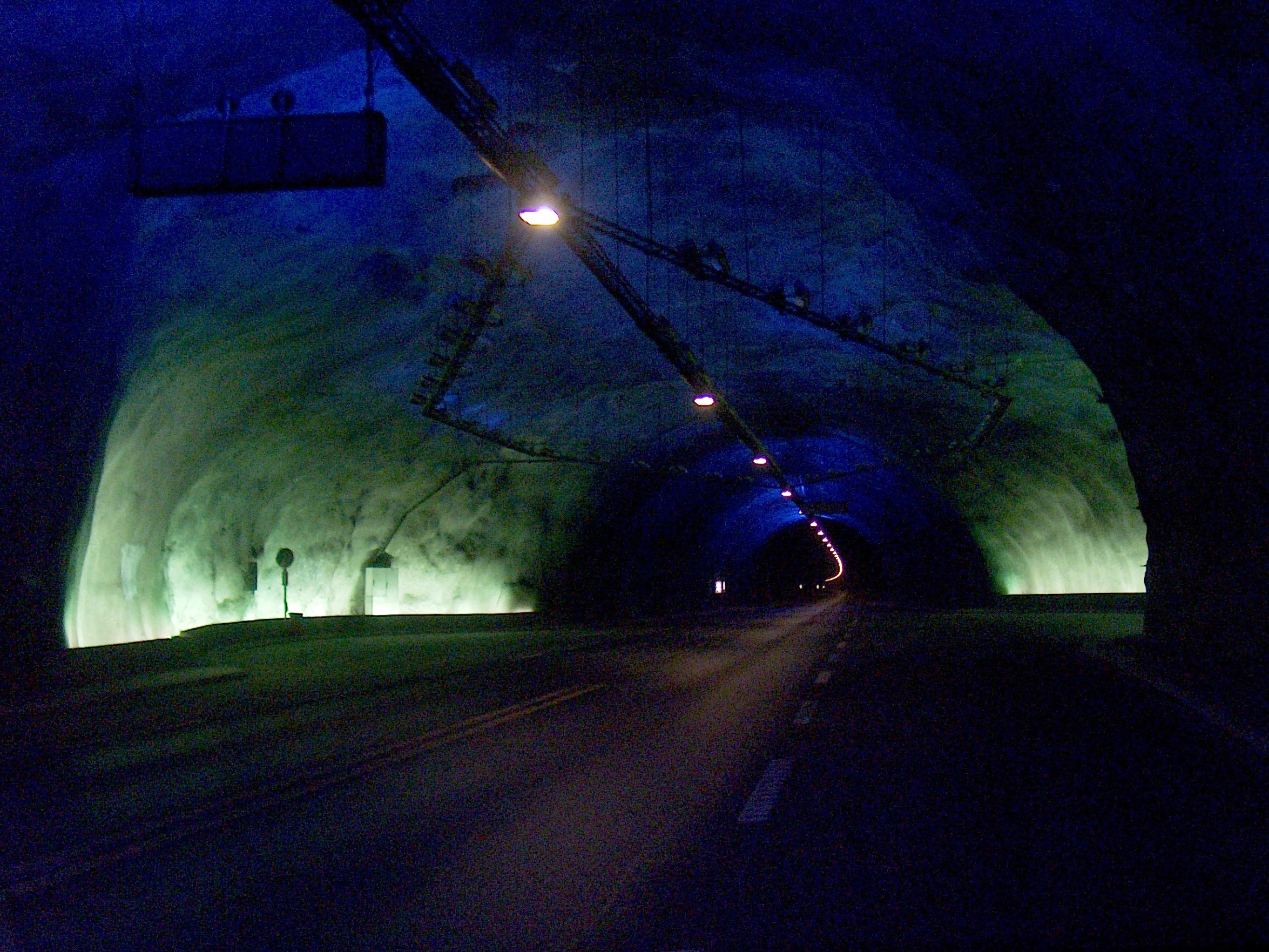
Lærdal tunnel

Lærdal tunnel cave

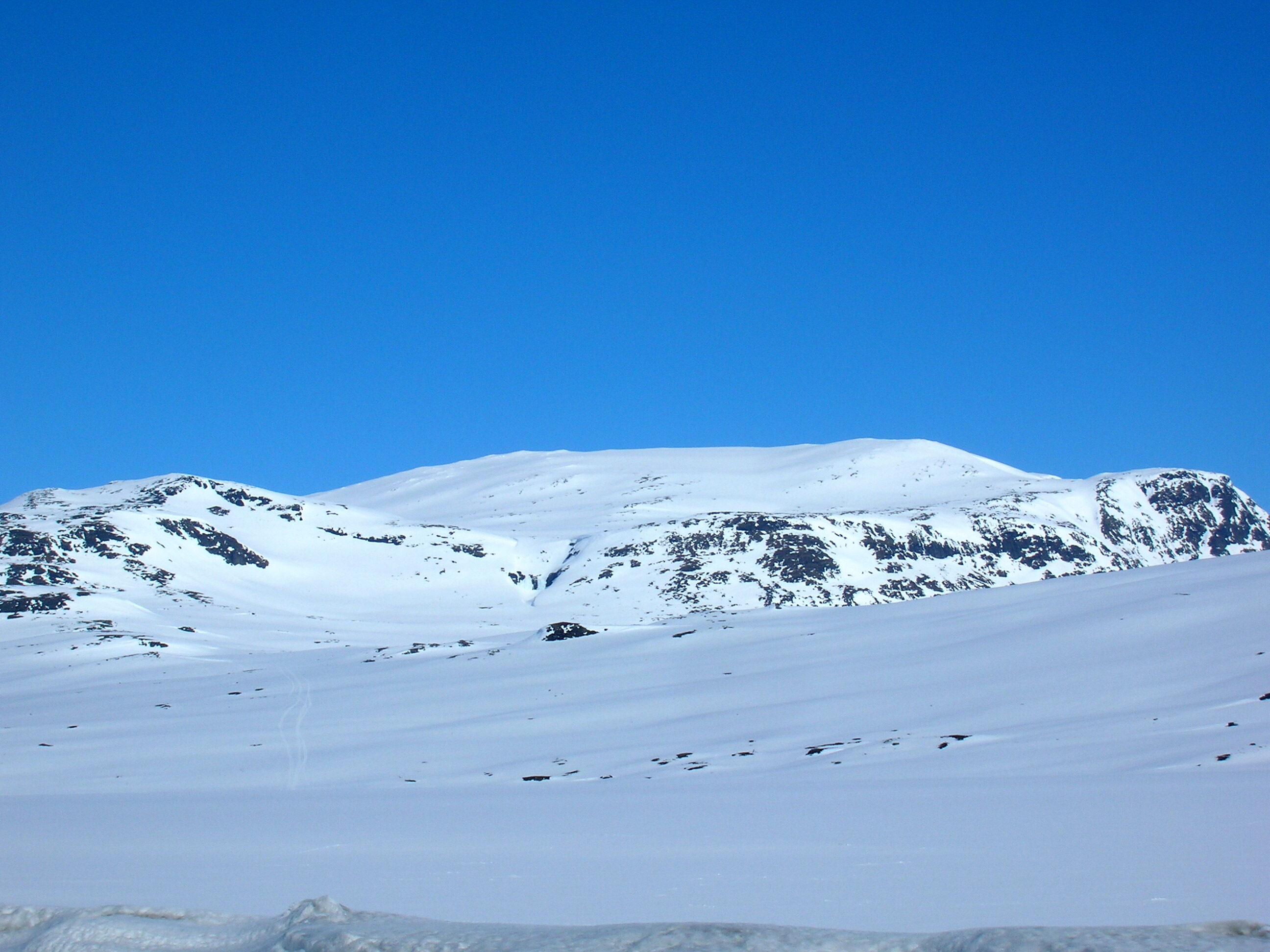
Store Jukleeggi – Mountain in Lærdal
