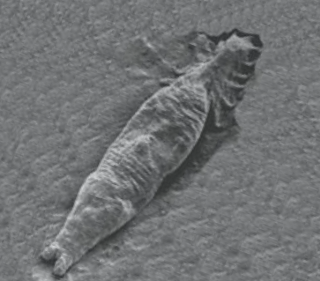

Scientific classification
- Kingdom: Animalia
- Phylum: Platyhelminthes
- Class: Monogenea
- Order: Gyrodactylidea
- Family: Gyrodactylidae
- Genus: Gyrodactylus
- Species: G. salaris

Binomial name
- Gyrodactylus salaris Malmberg, 1957

= Gyrodactylus salaris =

Species of flatworm

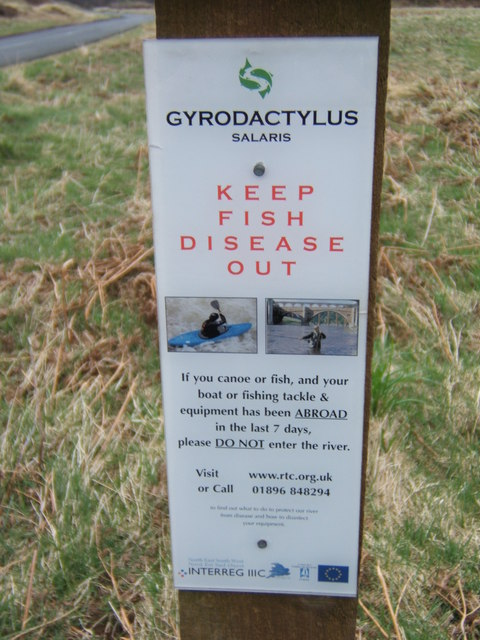
A warning sign in Scotland

Gyrodactylus salaris, commonly known as salmon fluke, salmon killer, or the Norwegian salmon killer is a tiny monogenean ectoparasite which lives on the body surface of freshwater fish. This leech-like parasite has been implicated in the reduction of Atlantic salmon populations in the Norwegian fjords. It also parasitises other species, including rainbow trout. G. salaris requires fresh water, but can survive in brackish water for up to 18 hours.

The parasite is 0.5 mm (0.02 in) long, and cannot be seen with the naked eye, but it can be seen with a magnifying glass. On its posterior end is a haptor, a specialized organ for attaching to the host fish, which has sixteen hooks around its edge. The parasite is viviparous, that is, it produces live offspring. The parasites give birth to live young nearly as big as themselves and at this time, a further generation is already growing inside the neonates.

== Interactions with host fish ==
When feeding, the parasite attaches its anterior end to the fish with cephalic glands. It everts its pharynx through the mouth and releases a digestive solution with proteolytic enzymes which dissolves the salmon skin. Mucus and dissolved skin are then sucked into the gut. Attachment of many parasites can cause large wounds, damaging the epidermis of the host fish, which allows secondary infections.

== History ==
G. salaris was first described in 1952, after being removed from a Baltic strain of Atlantic salmon kept at the Hölle Laboratory in Sweden, near to the river Indalsälv. At the time, it was not thought to cause disease in the host fish. The presence of G. salaris on fish became a World Organisation for Animal Health notifiable disease in 1983.

Catastrophic losses of Atlantic salmon occurred in Norway in the 1970s following the introduction of G. salaris. By 2001, the salmon populations of 41 Norwegian rivers had been virtually wiped out in this way.

Historically, Gyrodactylus-infected rivers have been treated with the indiscriminate pesticide/piscicide rotenone. A newer method of treatment employs dosing small volumes of aqueous aluminium salts and sulfuric acid into the river. A huge advantage of this method is its ability to kill the parasites without harming the hosts. This new method has shown promising results in Batnfjordelva and Lærdalselvi, two rivers in Norway.
