= Frønningen =

Village in Lærdal Municipality, Norway

- Village
- Interactive map of Frønningen
- Location within Vestland Location within Norway
- Coordinates: 61.1106°N 7.0696°E
- Country: Norway
- Region: Western Norway
- County: Vestland
- District: Sogn
- Municipality: Lærdal Municipality
- Elevation: 14 m (46 ft)
- Time zone: UTC+01:00 (CET)
  - Summer (DST): UTC+02:00 (CEST)
- Post Code: 6855 Frønningen

Frønningen is a village in Lærdal Municipality in Vestland county, Norway. It is located in the far northwestern corner of the municipality, east of where the Aurlandsfjorden empties into the main Sognefjorden. Frønningen only had 17 inhabitants in 2001, and there is no outside road connection. The only access to Frønningen is by a ferry that goes between the three villages of Kaupanger, Frønningen, and Gudvangen.

Local painters such as Knut Rumohr have become nationally known, and today Frønningen has a gallery with his art.

== History ==
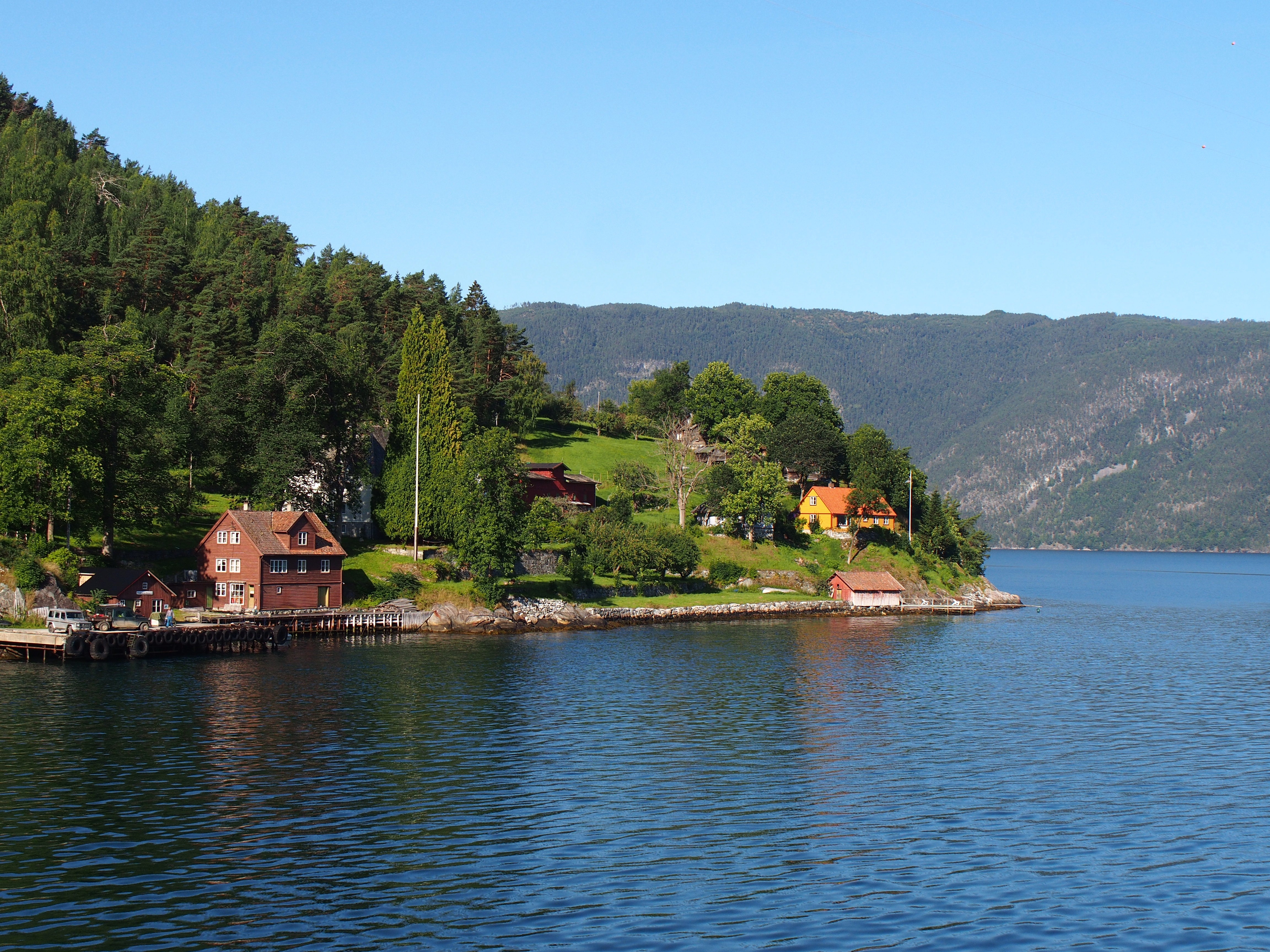
View of Frønningen

Frønningen is the site of Frønningen-godset, an historic manor. It was sold in 1651 to a cleric from Bergen, the magister Peder Nilssøn Lem, whose mother owned large forests and farms in the neighboring area. He then further extended his properties in the area. His great-grandson Hans Sørensen Lem was the first of the family who moved here and actually lived on Frønningen, when he moved here about 1740. The estate was owned by the Lem family until 1889, when it was taken over by Bjarnhard Rumohr, who was a relative of the last Lem.

Frønningen has since belonged to the Rumohr family and it currently covers about 62,000 hectares (150,000 acres) of forest. The main building is a large white painted wooden building that is one and a half storeys, built in 1901 by landowner Bjarnhard Rumohr. The house has an H-shaped floor plan. The building is located right on the bay, with a terraced garden down to the fjord.

Prior to 1992, this area was a part of the old Leikanger Municipality, but on 1 January 1992 it was transferred to Lærdal Municipality.
