= Borgund, Lærdal =

Borgund
- Village
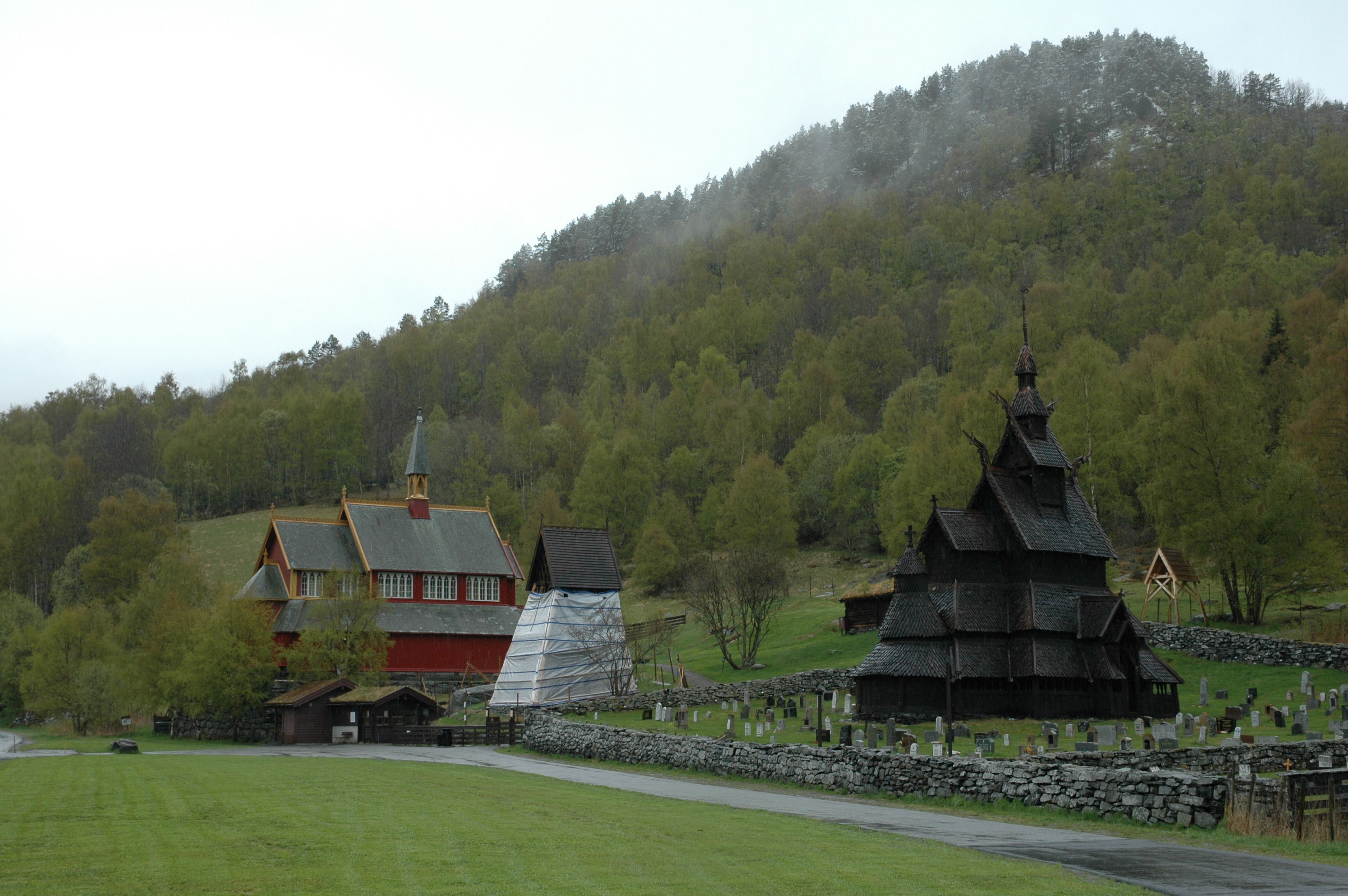
- View of the village churches
- Interactive map of Borgund
- Location within Vestland Location within Norway
- Coordinates: 61.0487°N 7.8135°E
- Country: Norway
- Region: Western Norway
- County: Vestland
- District: Sogn
- Municipality: Lærdal Municipality
- Elevation: 400 m (1,300 ft)
- Time zone: UTC+01:00 (CET)
  - Summer (DST): UTC+02:00 (CEST)
- Post Code: 6888 Borgund

Borgund is a small village in Lærdal Municipality in Vestland county, Norway. It lies along the European route E16 highway, about 20 kilometres (12 mi) southeast of the village of Lærdalsøyri. It is the site of the Borgund Church and the historic Borgund Stave Church.

== History ==
Historically, the village was part of the old Borgund Municipality which existed from 1864 until its dissolution in 1964.

=== Name ===
The municipality (originally the parish) was named after the old Borgund farm (Old Norse: Borgyndr), where the historic Borgund Stave Church is located. The name is derived from the old word borg which means "fortress" or "stronghold".
