= Borgund Church (disambiguation) =

Borgund Church is a stone church from the 14th century in Ålesund, Norway.

Borgund Church may also refer to:

- Borgund Church (Lærdal), a church consecrated in 1868 in Lærdal, Norway
- Borgund Stave Church, a medieval stave church in Lærdal, Norway
