= Gustav Adolf Stave Church =

Gustavus Adolphus Stave Church
- Gustaf-Adolf-Stabkirche
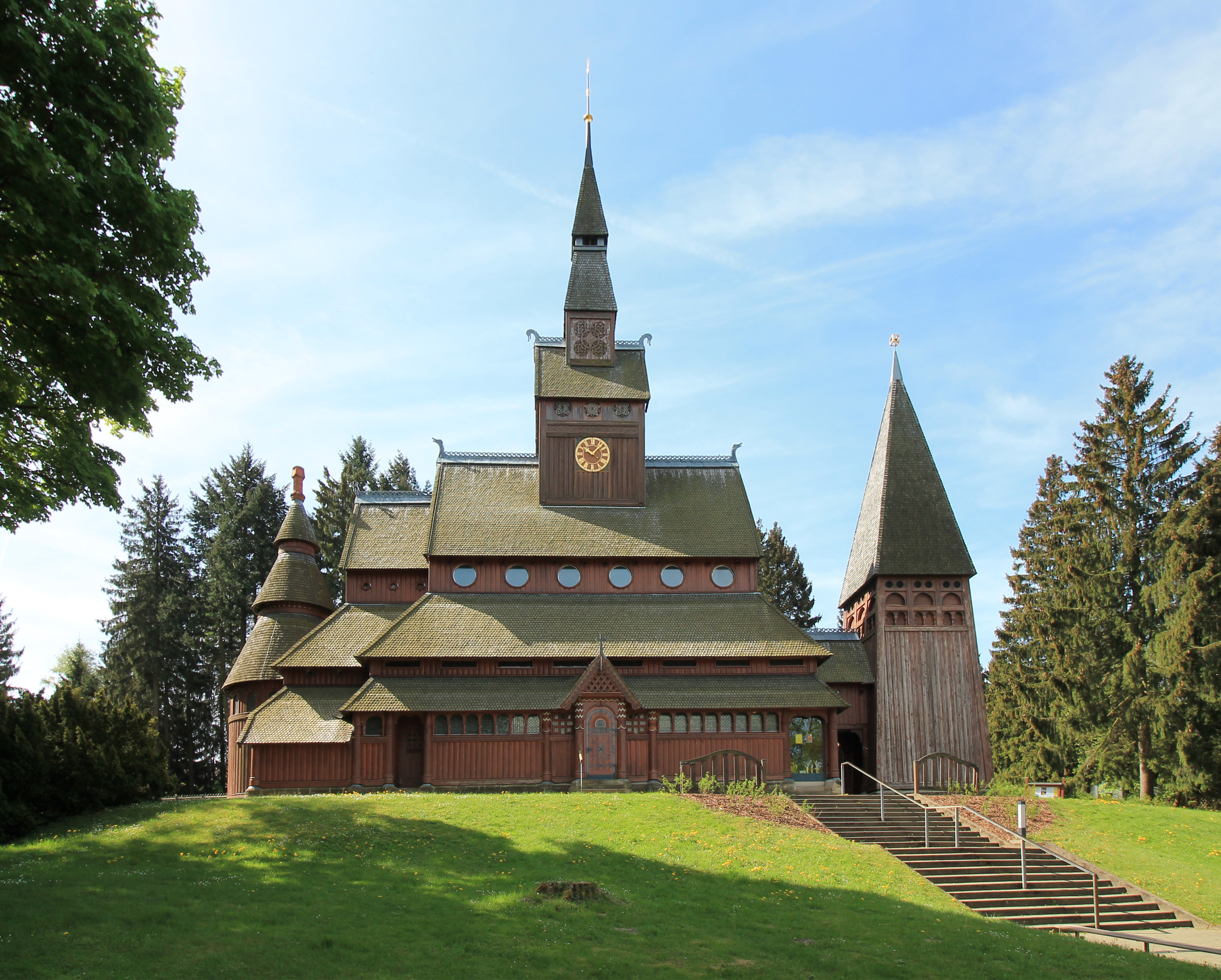
- View from North

- Location within Lower Saxony Location within Germany
- 51°51′25″N 10°20′24″E
- Location: Hahnenklee, Goslar
- Country: Germany
- Denomination: Lutheran
- Website: website of the congregation (in German)

History
- Status: parish church
- Dedicated: 28 June 1908

Architecture
- Functional status: active
- Architect: Karl Mohrmann
- Architectural type: stave church
- Style: Historicism
- Groundbreaking: 1907
- Completed: 1908

Specifications
- Materials: spruce wood

Administration
- Deanery: Hildesheim Deanery
- Parish: Hahnenklee-Bockwiese Congregation

The Lutheran Gustav Adolf Stave Church (German: Gustav-Adolf-Stabkirche) is a stave church situated in Hahnenklee, a borough of Goslar in the Harz mountains, Germany. Construction of the church began in 1907 and it was consecrated on 28 June 1908.

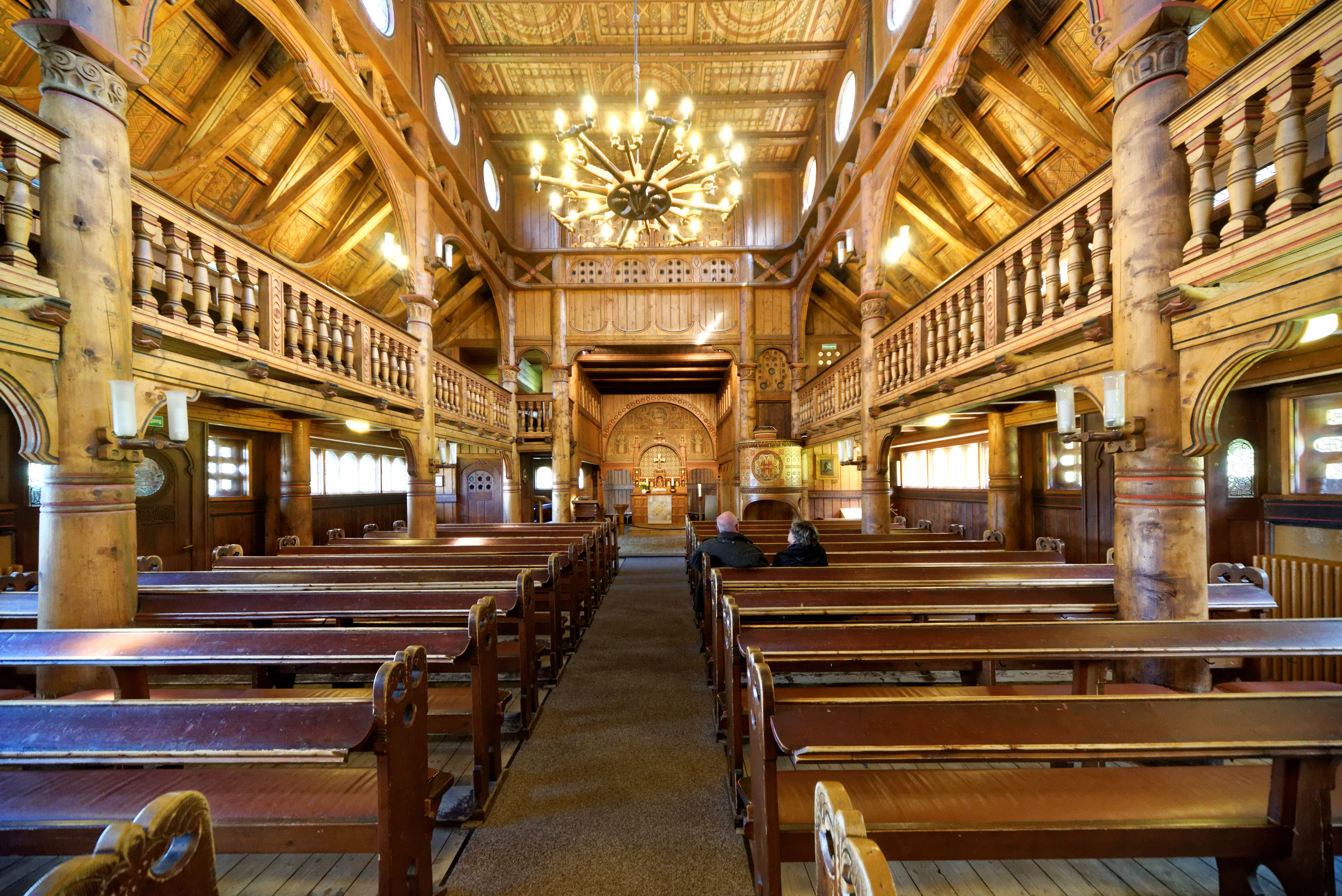
Interior

The church is a copy of the medieval Borgund Stave Church in Norway. It was erected during the sudden rise in Hahnenklee's popularity as a spa town and major tourist destination, with adaptions to fulfil its role as a parish church. The plans were designed by Karl Mohrmann (1857–1927), architect of the Evangelical-Lutheran Church of Hanover, a representative of the historicist Hanover school of architecture. He had visited Borgund and held the view that stave churches once were common in the medieval Saxon areas too.

The church was built from spruce trunks harvested at the nearby Bocksberg mountain. The interior comprises numerous carvings of archaic symbols as well as Viking ship design features. The building soon became a frequently visited landmark and a popular wedding church.
