= Hamingja =

Type of female guardian spirit in Norse mythology

The hamingja was a type of female guardian spirit in Norse mythology. It was believed that she accompanied a person and decided their luck and happiness. Hamingja is used primarily in the abstract sense. Consequently, the name was also used to indicate happiness, and that is what it means in modern Icelandic. When a person died, the hamingja passed to a beloved family member and thus accompanied a family for several generations, continuing to influence their fortunes. It was even possible to lend one's own hamingja to a friend, or king as happened when Hjalti Skeggiason was about to leave on a perilous voyage and asked Olaf II of Norway to lend him his hamingja. Luck was also believed to be inherited by man through their family and not simply something that happened to a person.

It usually appears during sleep in the form of an animal. It can also be the spirit of a sleeping person who appears in the form of an animal, as Bödvar Bjarki in the saga of Hrólfr Kraki.

In Norse mythology, hamingja (Old Norse "luck") refers to two concepts:

- the personification of the good fortune or luck of an individual or family,
- the altered appearance of shape-shifters.

Both Andy Orchard and Rudolf Simek note parallels between the concept of the hamingja and the fylgja. Luck may be transferred to a descendant of the owner, or to a member of a tribe for a perilous journey. It accords wealth, success and power, and it accrues over a life time. Sometimes hamingja is used to denote honor.

== Etymology ==
The word hamingja is also connected to hamr, which is thought to be the physical form that expresses a person's mind or thoughts (hugr). This is thought by many scholars to derive from ham-gengja, a being that walks about in physical form. Scholars generally agree that hamingja originally referred to a physical expression of a person's personality, and only later came to mean abstract luck, which is also synonymous with gæfa and gipta. Additionally, many scholars following Jan de Vries, have suggested that the word may originate in the idea of a child's fetal membrane to be the luck-brining guardian spirit.

== See also ==
- Dís
- Norns
- Hugr

== General and cited references ==
- Orchard, Andy (1997). Dictionary of Norse Myth and Legend. Cassell. ISBN 0-304-34520-2
- Simek, Rudolf (2007) translated by Angela Hall. Dictionary of Northern Mythology. D.S. Brewer. ISBN 0-85991-513-1
