= Runic inscription N 351 =

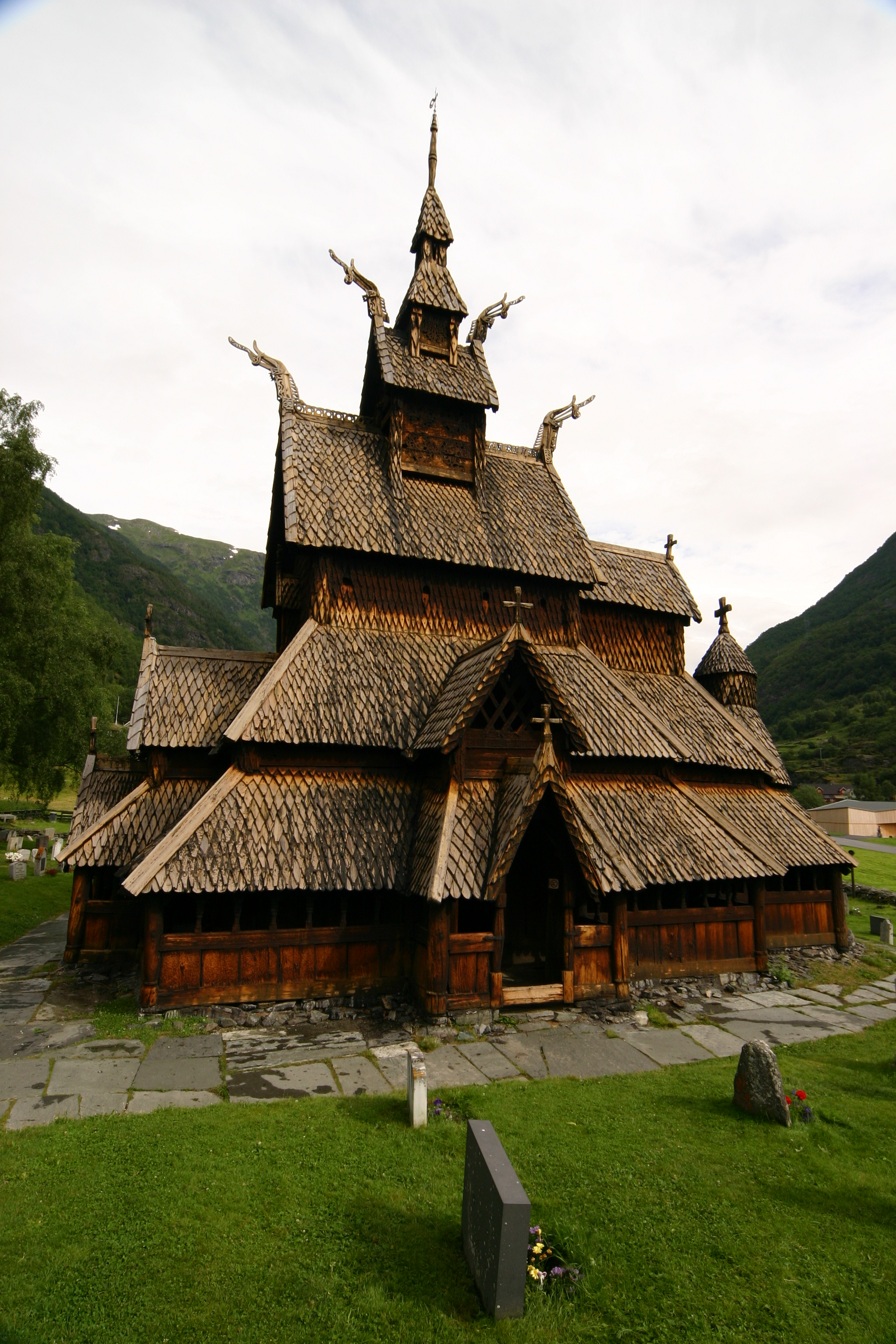
The stave church in Borgund.

N 351 is the Rundata catalog number for a medieval runic inscription carved on a piece of wood that was found at the north portal of the Borgund stave church in Norway.

== Description ==
This runic inscription states that it was carved by a man named Þórir into a piece of wood while visiting the church during the mass of Saint Olaf during the Middle Ages. Olaf was king of Norway from 1015 to 1028 C.E. and legally recognized Christianity as the nation's religion in 1024, and in the century after his death was recognized as a saint. His feast day is celebrated on July 29, the date of his death.

The inscription testifies to lingering beliefs in the pagan Norns, the female beings who rule the fates of the various races in Norse mythology. Here Þórir blames the Norns for his troubles, just as the characters do in the Reginsmál and Sigurðarkviða hin skamma of the Poetic Edda. One of the Bryggen inscriptions, listed as B145 or as N B145 M under Rundata, also refers to the Norns.

== Inscription ==
Transliteration from Scandinavian Runic-text Database (Rundata).

þo=rir · ræist · runa=r · þessa=r · þan · olaus·mess·o=æpþa=n ¶ …r han · fo=r · he=r um ¶ ⁓ bæþe= =ge=rþo= =no=(r)ne=r · uæl · o=k · il=la · mikla · møþe ¶ g skapaþu · þær mer
Þórir {} reist {} rúnar {} þessar {} þann {} Ólausmessaptan, {} [e]r han {} fór {} hér um. {} {} Bæði gerðu nornir {} vel {} ok {} illa, {} mikla {} mœði {} … skǫpuðu {} þær mér.
Þórir carved these runes on the eve of Olaus-mass, when he travelled past here. The norns did both good and evil, great toil … they created for me.

== See also ==
- List of runestones

== Other sources ==
- Simek, Rudolf (translated by Angela Hall) (1996). Dictionary of Northern Mythology. D. S. Brewer. ISBN 0-85991-369-4, p. 237.
