= Wilhelm Ripe =

German painter and graphic designer (1818–1885)

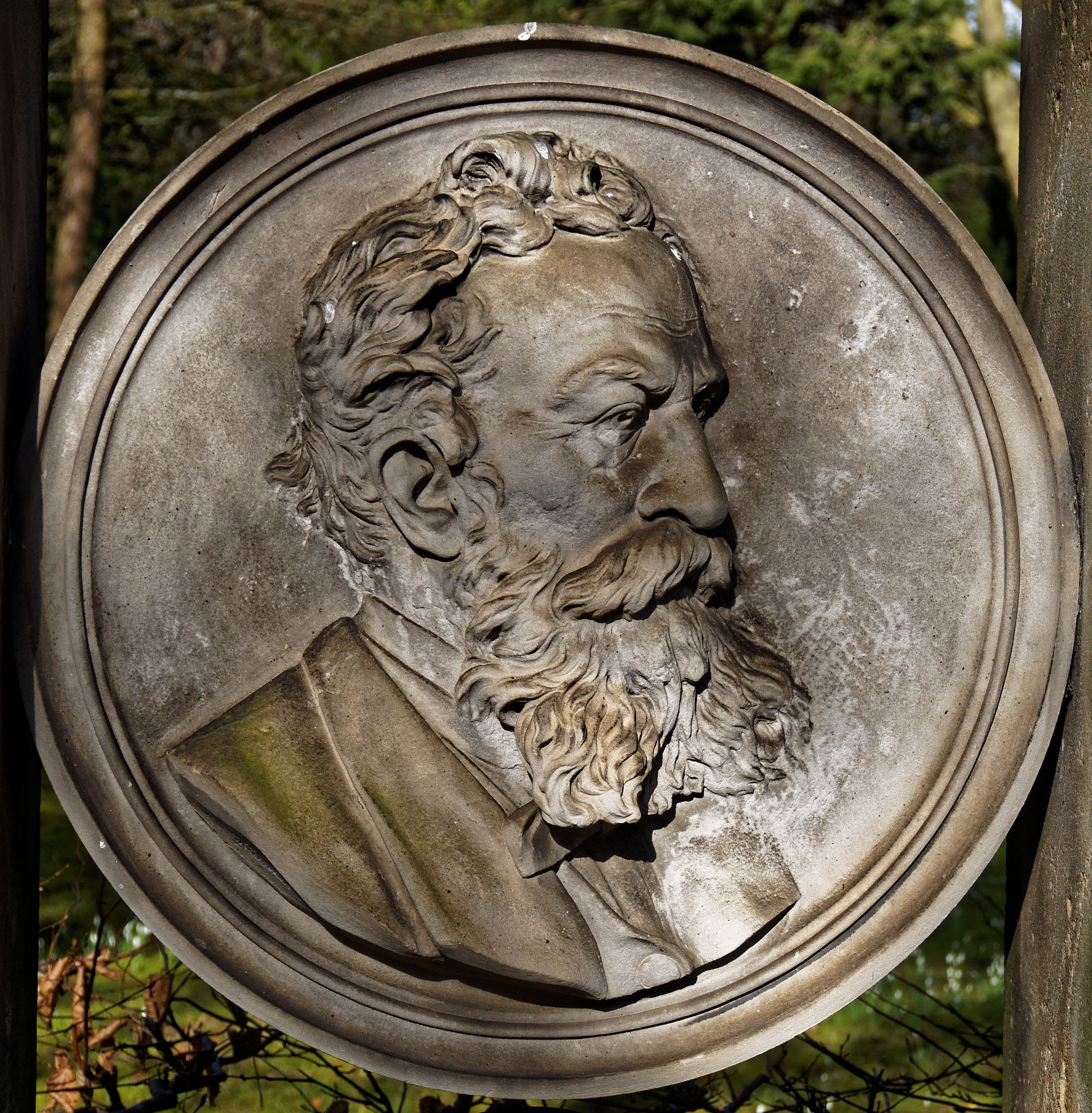
Grave medallion of Wilhelm Ripe in Goslar

Wilhelm Ripe (16 November 1818 – 5 December 1885) was a German painter and graphic designer.

Ripe was born in Hahnenklee in 1818. His contributions were during the era of Romanticism.

He died in Goslar in 1885.
