= Hahnenklee =

District of Goslar, Germany

Coordinates: 51°51′50″N 10°20′27″E

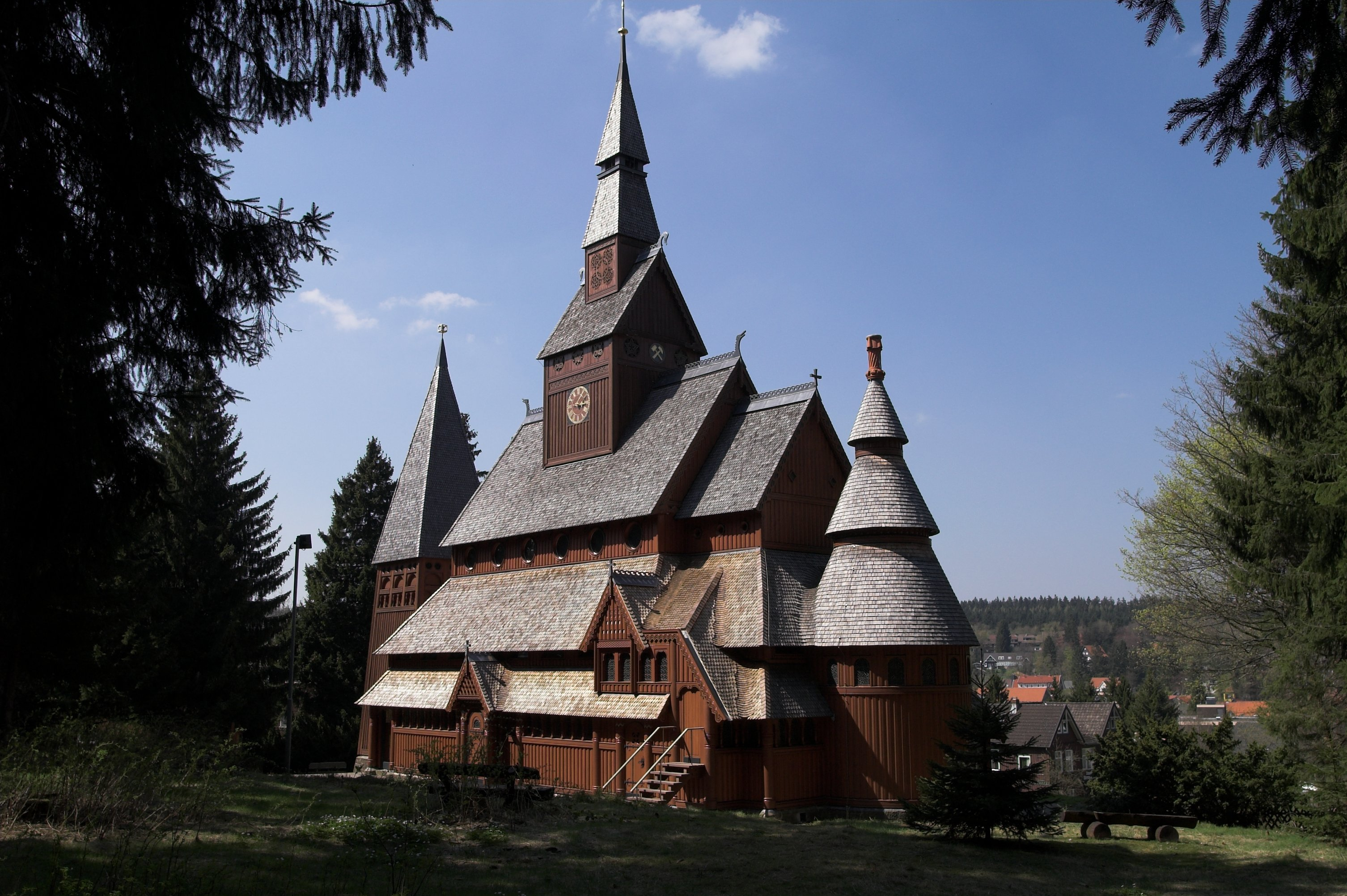
Stave church

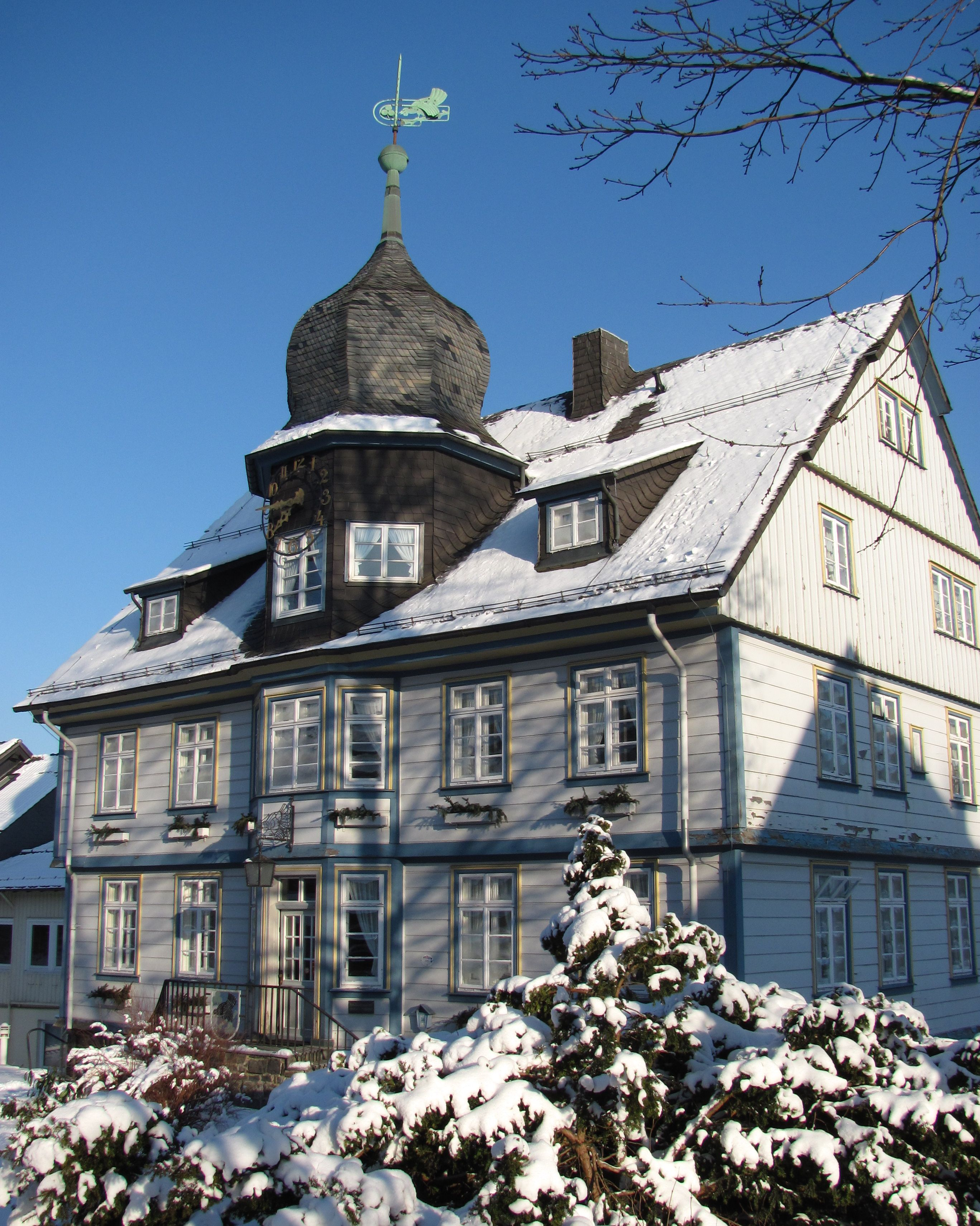
Former Town Hall

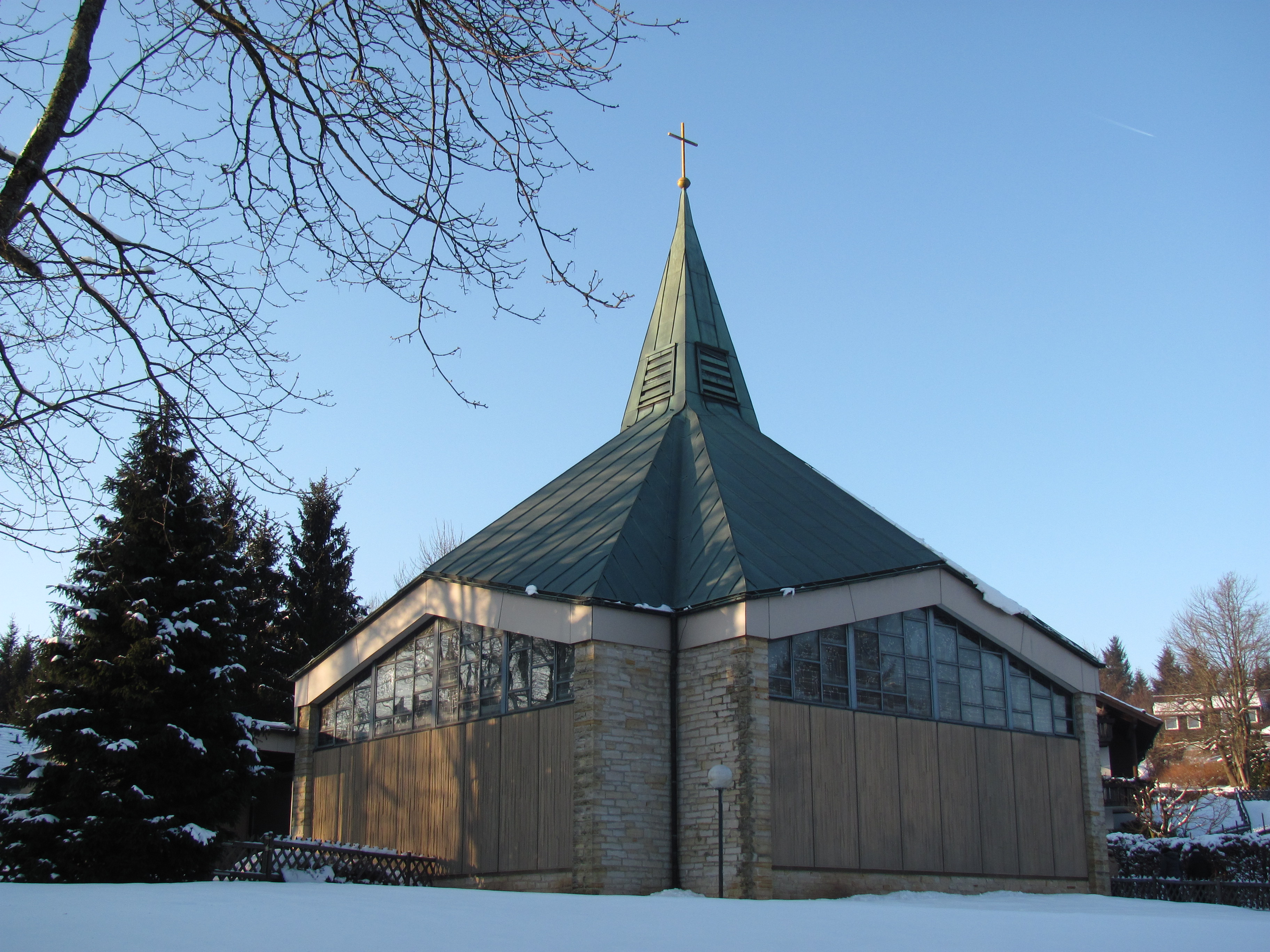
Catholic Church Maria im Schnee

Hahnenklee is a borough of the city of Goslar, in the German state of the Lower Saxony. It is located within the Harz mountain range between Goslar and Osterode. The population is about 1200 inhabitants.

== History ==
Hahnenklee became a state-recognised climatic spa in 1882. The village had 336 inhabitants at the beginning of the 20th century. The district of Hahnenklee also comprises the former village of Bockswiese, both are mining settlements originating from the 16th century that were incorporated in 1972. Today the area mainly depends on tourism and forestry.

In the Nazi time, Hahnenklee was home to many houses of the NS organisation “Mother and Child” - in their facilities, more than 3600 children were born. Even a birth station of the Lebensborn organisation was present. Shortly after the war, in the former mothers home of the NSV 18 Latvian children died from starvation - the circumstances were never cleared completely. The more than 100 children that survived were spread all over the world.

== Sights ==
Hahnenklee is chiefly known for the Protestant Gustav Adolf Stave Church, built by the architect Karl Mohrmann (1857-1927) in 1908. The adjacent bell tower was added in 1975 for extending the carillon up to the current 49 bells.

Several historic wooden buildings, e.g. the former town hall, can be seen in the High Street.

The smaller Catholic Church Saint Mary in the Snow (Sankt Maria im Schnee) was built in 1975.

The grave of the composer Paul Lincke who died in Hahnenklee in 1946 is worth a visit as well.

== Notable people ==
- Wilhelm Ripe, painter, born 16 November 1818 in Hahnenklee, died 5 December 1885 in Goslar
- Hans-Georg Wenzel (1949–1999), geodesist, geophysicist and university lecturer
