= Borgund Church (Lærdal) =

Church in Vestland, Norway

- Borgund kyrkje
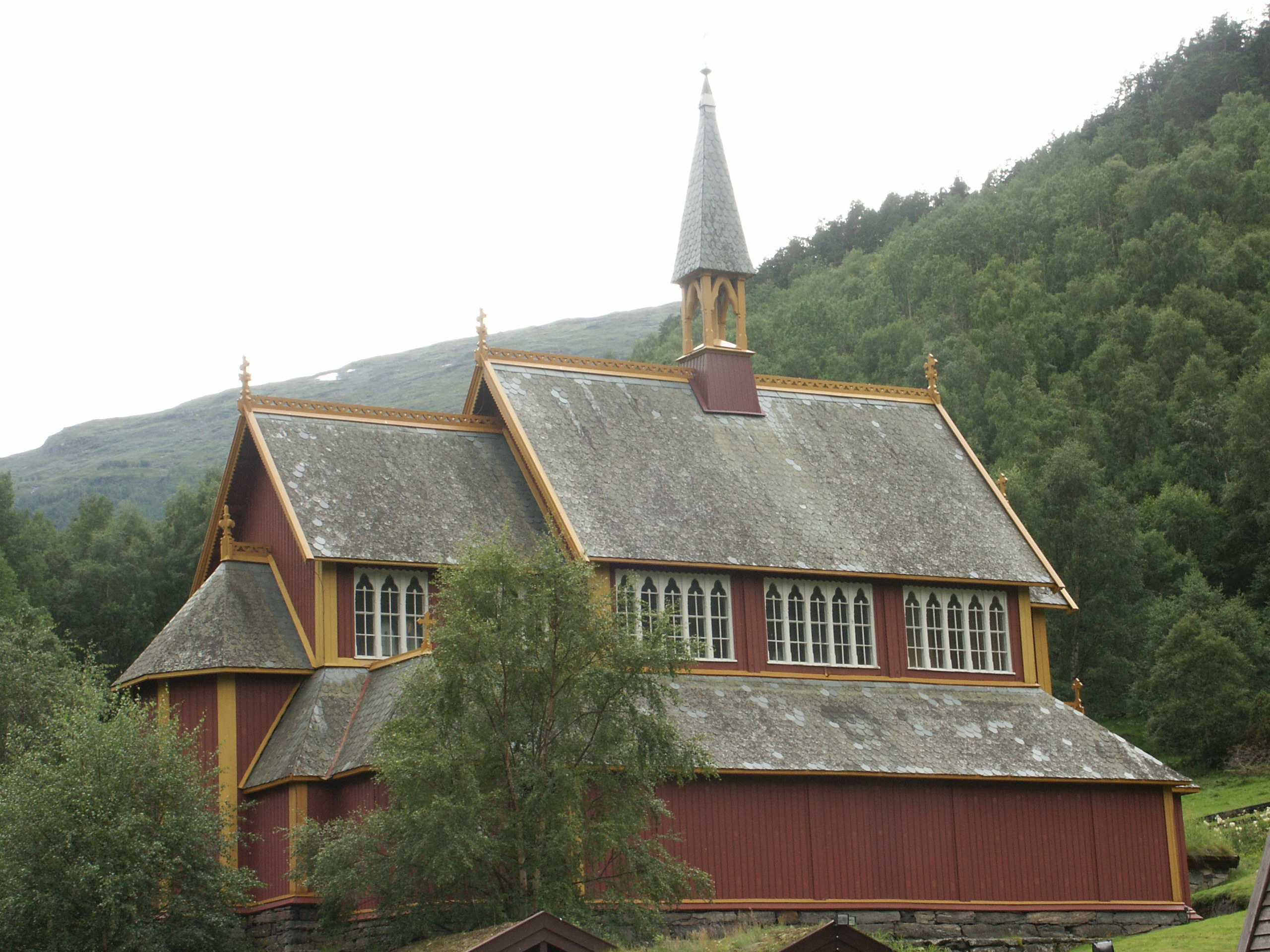
- View of the church
- Borgund Church
- 61°02′48″N 7°48′45″E
- Location: Lærdal Municipality, Vestland
- Country: Norway
- Denomination: Church of Norway
- Churchmanship: Evangelical Lutheran

History
- Status: Parish church
- Founded: 1868
- Consecrated: 28 August 1868

Architecture
- Functional status: Active
- Architect: Christian Christie
- Architectural type: Long church
- Style: Dragestil
- Completed: 1868 (158 years ago)

Specifications
- Capacity: 175
- Materials: Wood

Administration
- Diocese: Bjørgvin bispedømme
- Deanery: Sogn prosti
- Parish: Borgund
- Norwegian Cultural Heritage Site
- Type: Church
- Status: Listed
- ID: 83933

Borgund Church (Norwegian: Borgund kyrkje) is a parish church of the Church of Norway in Lærdal Municipality in Vestland county, Norway. It is located in the village of Borgund. It is the church for the Borgund parish which is part of the Sogn prosti (deanery) in the Diocese of Bjørgvin. The red, wooden church was built in a long church design and in the dragestil style in 1868 using plans drawn up by the architect Christian Christie. The church seats about 175 people.

== History ==
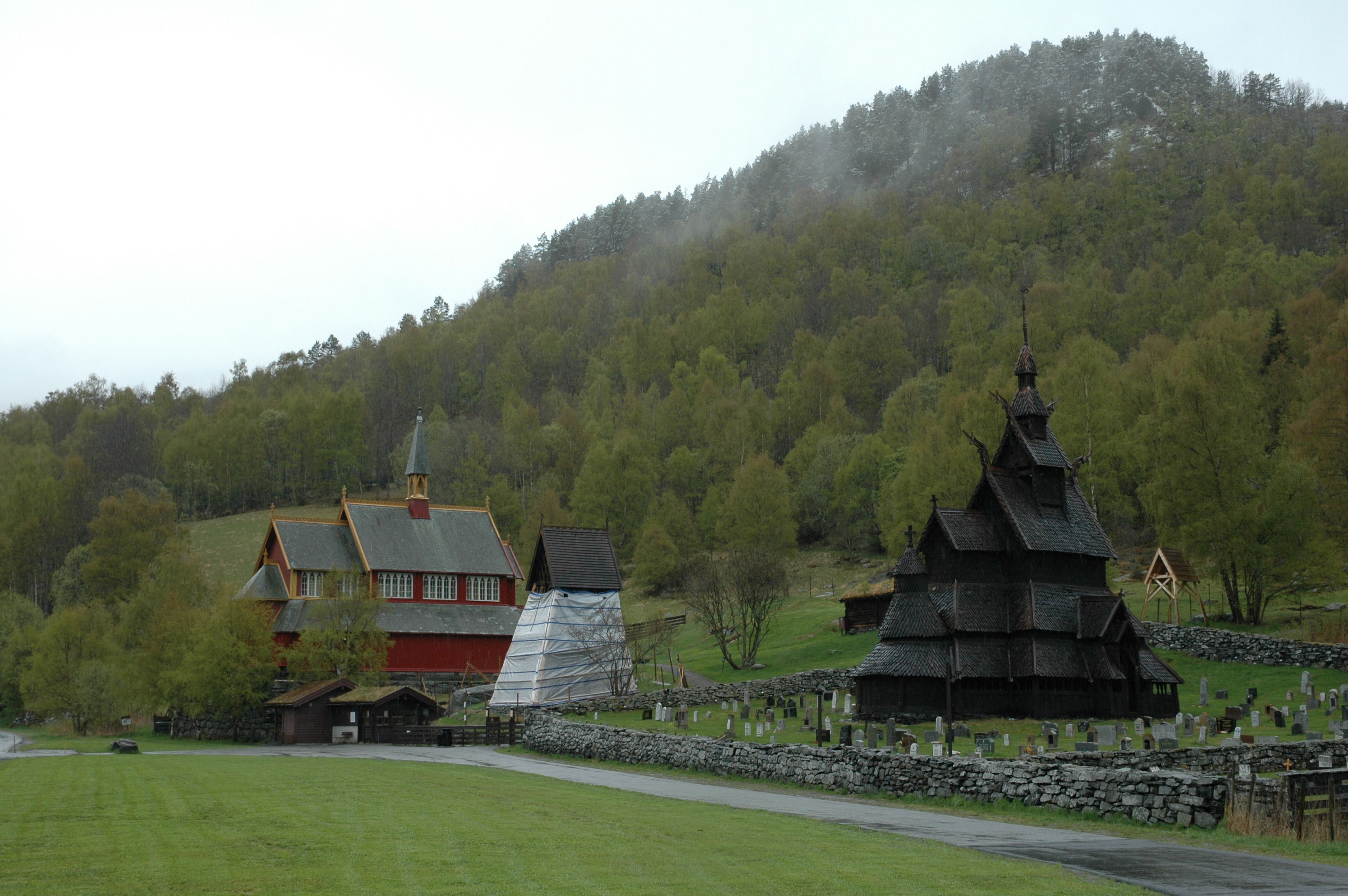
Borgund Church and the neighbouring Borgund Stave Church

The church was built in 1868 to replace the ancient Borgund Stave Church, located right next to it. The new church was consecrated on 28 August 1868 by Pastor Henning Frimann Dahl. The church was built because the old stave church was too small for the parish, so the new church was built and the old one was turned into a museum. Christian Christie designed a new stave church-inspired building and the lead builders were F. Gade and C. Aghte.

In a deal worked out by the local priest and the municipal council, the Society for the Preservation of Ancient Norwegian Monuments paid for two-thirds of the cost of the new church and in exchange, they took over the old stave church afterwards. After the construction was finished, there was some disagreement between the municipality and the Society, so the actual transfer of ownership did not happen until 1877. In 1948, the church received electric lighting.

== See also ==
- List of churches in Bjørgvin
