= Aubert =

This surname has Anglo-Saxon pre-8th century origins; spelling variations include Albert, Albertson and Alberts in English names. It is derived from the Old German compound 'Aedelbeort' meaning 'noble-bright'. However, many sources show it as a French surname, with many spelling variations on the French form. It is now found in many locations of the world, spread by French Huguenot refugees, amongst others.

Notable people with this surname include the following:

- Abbé Aubert (1731–1814), French playwright, poet and journalist
- Louis Aubert (painter) (1720 – c. 1800), painter and composer
- Alexander Aubert (1730–1805), English merchant
- Alvin Aubert (1930–2014), American poet
- Anaïs Aubert, known as Mademoiselle Anaïs (1802–1871), French actress
- Andreas Aubert (art historian) (1851–1913), Norwegian art historian
- Aristide Aubert Du Petit Thouars (1760–1798), French naval officer
- Arnaud Aubert (1319–1371), Catholic Chamberlain
- Étienne Aubert (1282–1362), later became Pope Innocent VI
- Aubert of Avranches, bishop of Avranches
- Axel Aubert (1873–1943), Norwegian businessman
- Ebba d'Aubert (1813–1860), Swedish pianist
- François d'Aubert (born 1943), French politician
- Hermann Rudolph Aubert (1826–1892), German physiologist
- Jacques Aubert (1689–1753), French composer and violinist
- Jean Aubert (architect) (c. 1680–1741), French architect
- Jean Aubert (engineer) (1894–1984), French engineer
- Jean-Louis Aubert (born 1955), French guitarist, singer and songwriter
- Jeanne Aubert (1900–1988), French singer and actress
- Joseph-Jean-Félix Aubert, French painter
- Julien Aubert (born 1978), French politician
- K. D. Aubert (born 1978), American actress
- Louis Aubert (1877–1968), French composer
- Louis-Marie Aubert du Petit-Thouars (1758–1831), French botanist
- Ludvig Cæsar Martin Aubert (1807–1887), Norwegian philologist
- Ludvig Mariboe Benjamin Aubert (1838–1896), Norwegian jurist and politician
- Marie-Hélène Aubert (born 1961), French politician
- Philippe-Ignace François Aubert de Gaspé (died 1841), Canadian writer
- Philippe-Joseph Aubert de Gaspé (1786–1871), French Canadian writer and seigneur
- Pierre Aubert (1927–2016), Swiss politician
- Puig Aubert (1925–1994), French rugby league footballer
- Raphaël Aubert (born 1953), Swiss writer and essayist
- Suzanne Aubert (1835–1926), Catholic sister
- Vilhelm Aubert (1922–1988), Norwegian sociologist
- Vilhelm Mariboe Aubert (1868–1908), Norwegian jurist

- Aubert (noble family), a noble family of Denmark and Norway

== See also ==
- Albert
- Aubèrt
- Aubertin
