= D'Aubert family =

d'Aubert
- Nobility
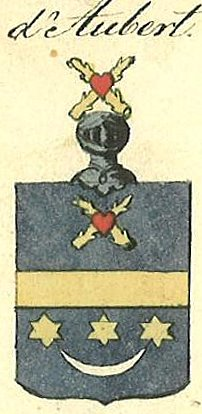
- Family coat of arms. Drawing from Norway 1820
- Country: France; Denmark; Norway
- Place of origin: Thionville, Lorraine
- Founded: 1612
- Founder: Jean Aubert

The d'Aubert family, or Aubert, is a family of the French nobility. Branches also belong to the Nobility of Denmark and to the Nobility of Norway. The family originates in the town of Thionville in Lothringen (now the Lorraine region), where their progenitor Jean Aubert was a merchant. Today members live in France, in Denmark, in Norway, in Sweden, and in Germany.

== France ==
The noble family of Aubert was founded in the Duchy of Lorraine with the ennoblement in 1612 of Jean Aubert, a merchant of Thionville. This town was at the time in Habsburg possession and a part of the Holy Roman Empire. In 1659 it was annexed by France.

== Denmark and Norway ==
Jean d'Aubert's great-great-grandson, François Jacques Xavier d'Aubert (1727–1793) emigrated to Denmark in 1752 to take up a career in the Danish army. He became a Dano-Norwegian nobleman in 1776.

Separate branches of the family descend from his two sons, both military men: Benoni d'Aubert (1768–1832), who moved from Denmark to Norway and founded the Norwegian branch of the family, and Jacques d'Aubert (1769–1844), whose son Oskar Aubert (1831-1900) was the ancestor of the Danish and German branches of the family.

== Gallery ==
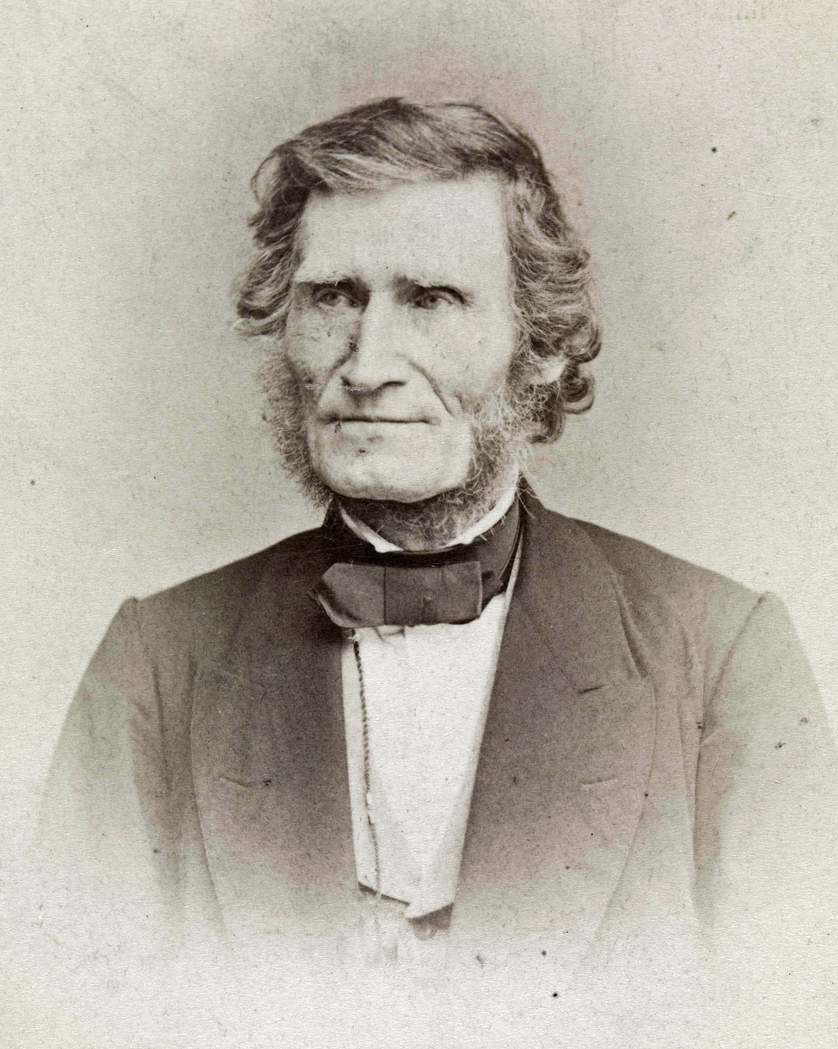
Ludvig Cæsar Martin Auber

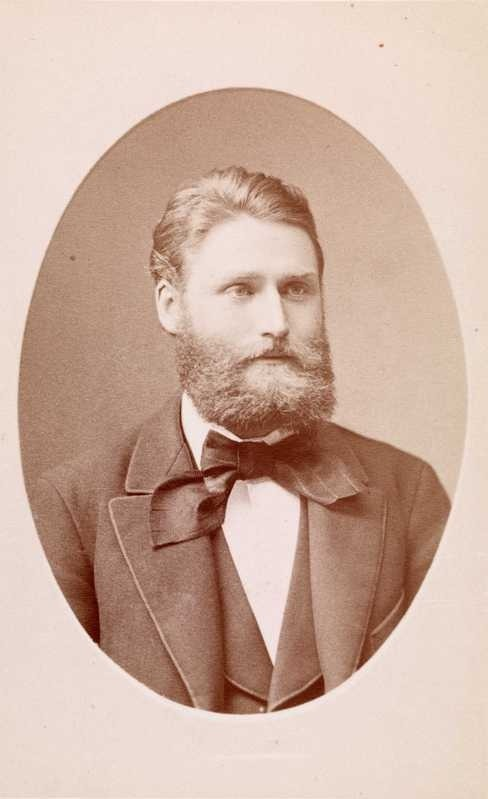
Andreas Aubert

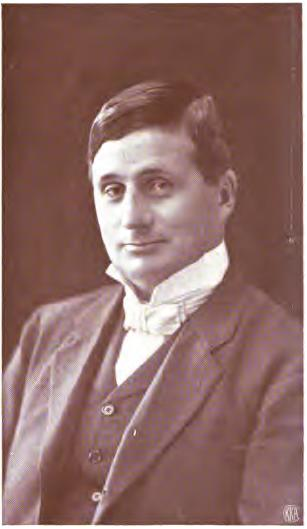
Vilhelm Mariboe Aubert

== Notable members ==
- Ludvig Cæsar Martin Aubert (1807–1887), Norwegian philologist
- Michael Conrad Sophus Emil Aubert (1811–1872), Norwegian member of Parliament
- Ebba d'Aubert née Bergström(1819–1860), Swedish pianist
- Ludvig Mariboe Benjamin Aubert (1838–1896), Norwegian jurist and politician
- Andreas Aubert (1851–1913), Norwegian art historian
- Vilhelm Mariboe Aubert (1868–1908), Norwegian jurist
- Axel Aubert (1873–1943), CEO of Norsk Hydro
- Vilhelm Aubert (1922–1988), Norwegian sociologist

== See also ==
- French nobility
- Danish nobility
- Norwegian nobility

== Literature ==
- Achen, Sven Tito: Danske adelsvåbener : En heraldisk nøgle 1973, Copenhagen.
- Cappelen, Hans: Norske slektsvåpen 1969, Oslo. 2nd ed., 1976.
- Løvenskiold, Herman Leopoldus: Heraldisk nøkkel 1978, Oslo.
- Munthe, Christopher Morgenstierne: Norske slegtsmerker in Norsk slektshistorisk tidsskrift, vol. I. 1928, Oslo.
- Storck, H.: Dansk Vaabenbog 1910, Copenhagen.
- Thiset, Anders and Wittrup, P.L.: Nyt Dansk Adelslexikon 1904, Copenhagen.
- Skandinavisk Vapenrulla, vol. VI. 1966, Malmö.
