= Marie-Anne-Catherine Quinault =

French singer and composer

- Born: 26 August 1695; Strasbourg
- Died: 1793 (aged 97–98)
- Other names: Mademoiselle Quinault the elder
- Occupations: singer and composer
- Years active: 1709–1722
- Father: Jean Quinault
- Relatives: Jean-Baptiste-Maurice Quinault (brother)
- Awards: grand cordon of the Order of Saint Michael

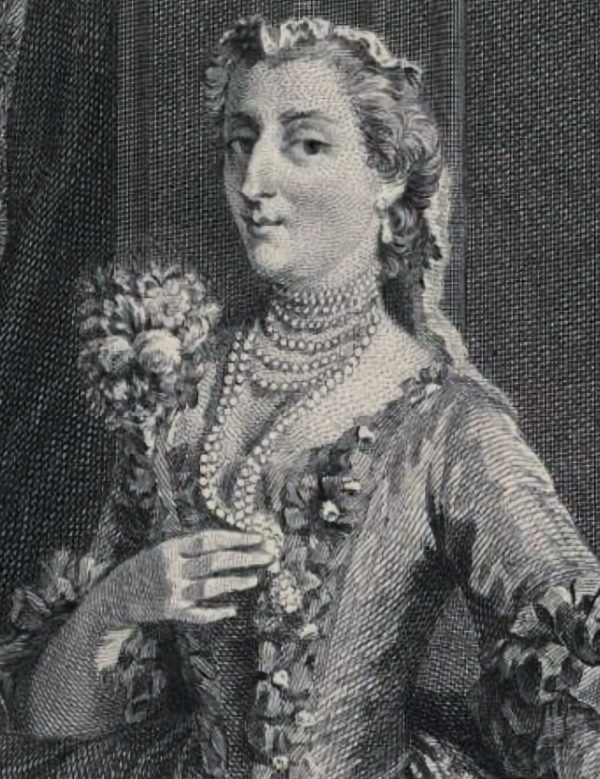
Quinault ainee — Dupuis Lancret

Marie-Anne-Catherine Quinault (French pronunciation: [maʁi an katʁin kino]; 26 August 1695 – 1793) (known as Mademoiselle Quinault l'aînée, the elder) was a French singer and composer.

Quinault was born in Strasbourg. Her father was the actor Jean Quinault (1656–1728), and one of her brothers was Jean-Baptiste-Maurice Quinault, a singer, composer, and actor. She made her debut at the Académie Royale de Musique in 1709 in Jean-Baptiste Lully's Bellérophon. She remained at the opera until 1713. In 1714 she began singing at the Comédie-Française, where she remained until 1722 Quinault composed motets for the Royal Chapel at the Palace of Versailles. For one of these motets, thanks to the benevolence of the Duke of Orléans, she was awarded the first and last grand cordon of the Order of Saint Michael ever given to a woman

She was the mistress first of Louis, the Duke of Orléans, and later of Philippe Jules François Mancini, the Duke of Nevers, to whom she may have secretly been married. This brought her into higher social spheres and earned her a pension on the King's privy purse. From 1723 until 1793 she lived in an apartment in the Louvre, at the Pavilion de L'Infante. She died in Paris in 1793.
