= Louis Fuzelier =

French playwright

Louis Fuzelier (also Fuselier, Fusellier, Fusillier, Fuzellier; 1672 or 1674 – 19 September 1752) was a French playwright.

Fuzelier was born and died in Paris. He wrote more than 200 plays for the Théâtre de la foire (theatres of the fair), alone or in collaboration with Alain-René Lesage, Alexis Piron or Jacques-Philippe d'Orneval.

Fuzelier wrote the libretto to Les Fêtes grecques et romaines, a ballet héroïque with music by François Colin de Blamont (1723) and to Les Indes galantes, an opéra-ballet with music by Jean-Philippe Rameau (1735), both performed in Paris at the Théâtre du Palais-Royal by the Académie Royale de Musique. Fuzelier also wrote some works for the Comédie-Française and was one of the principal editors of the Mercure de France, from 1721 to 1724 and from 1744 to 1752.

== List of works ==
=== Académie royale de musique ===
- 1713: Les Amours déguisés, ballet in one prologue and 3 entrées, music by Thomas-Louis Bourgeois
- 1714: Arion, tragedy in music in one prologue and 5 acts, music by Jean-Baptiste Matho
- 1718: Les Ages, ballet in one prologue and 3 entrées, music by André Campra
- 1723: Les Fêtes grecques et romaines, ballet héroïque in one prologue and 3 entrées, music by François Colin de Blamont
- 1725: La Reine des Péris, comédie persane in one prologue and 5 acts, music by Jacques Aubert
- 1727: Les Amours des dieux, ballet héroïque in one prologue and 4 entrées, music by Jean-Joseph Mouret
- 1729: Les Amours des déesses, ballet héroïque in one prologue and 3 entrées, music by Jean-Baptiste-Maurice Quinault
- 1730: Le Caprice d'Erato ou les Caractères de la musique, one-act divertissement, music by François Colin de Blamont
- 1735: Les Indes galantes, ballet héroïque in one prologue and 4 entrées, music by Jean-Philippe Rameau
- 1744: L'Ecole des amants, ballet in one prologue et 3 entrées, music by Jean-Baptiste Niel
- 1749: Le Carnaval du Parnasse, ballet héroïque in one prologue and 3 entrées, music by Jean-Joseph Cassanéa de Mondonville

=== Comédie-Française ===
- 1713: Cornélie Vestale, tragédie (1713)
- 1719: Momus fabuliste ou les Noces de Vulcain, one-act comedy, music by Jean-Baptiste-Maurice Quinault (1719)
- 1725: Les Amusements de l'automne, divertissement in one prologue and 2 acts
- 1727: Les Amazones modernes (with Marc-Antoine Legrand), three-act comedy
- 1732: Le Procès des sens, one-act comedy

=== Comédie Italienne ===
- 1718: La Mode, prologue, music by Jean-Joseph Mouret
- 1718: L'Amour maître de langues, comedy, music by Jean-Joseph Mouret
- 1718: La Fée Mélusine, three-act comedy, music by Jean-Joseph Mouret
- 1719: La Rupture du Carnaval et de la Folie, parody
- 1721: Hercule filant, parody
- 1722: Les Noces de Gamache, comedy, music by Jean-Joseph Mouret
- 1722: Le Vieux monde, ou Arlequin somnambule, comedy in one prologue and one act, music by Jean-Joseph Mouret
- 1722: Arlequin Persée, parody
- 1723: Le Serdeau des théâtres, one-act comedy
- 1723: La Parodie
- 1723: Les Saturnales, parody
- 1723: Les Débris des Saturnales
- 1724: Amadis le cadet, parody, music by Jean-Joseph Mouret
- 1725: Momus exilé, ou les Terreurs paniques, parody, music by Jean-Joseph Mouret
- 1725: L'Italienne française (with Biancolelli and Romagnesi), comedy in one prologue and 3 acts, music by Jean-Joseph Mouret
- 1726: La Bague magique, one-act comedy, music by Jean-Joseph Mouret

=== Théâtre de la Foire ===
- 1701: Thésée ou la Défaite des Amazones, divertissement mingled with humorous intermeds, Foire Saint-Laurent, Jeu des Victoires, Troupe de Bertrand
- 1705: Le Ravissement d'Hélène, le siège et l'embrasement de Troie, Foire Saint-Germain, Troupe de Bertrand
- 1710: Arlequin et Scaramouche vendangeurs, divertissement, Foire Saint-Laurent, Grand jeu du préau
- 1711: Apollon à la Foire, divertissement muet, Foire Saint-Germain, Jeu de Paume d'Orléans
- 1711: Jupiter curieux impertinent, divertissement, Foire Saint-Germain, Troupe d'Allard et Lalauze
- 1711: Scaramouche pédant, divertissement, Foire Saint-Laurent, Troupe de Dolet et La Place
- 1711: Orphée ou Arlequin aux enfers, divertissement, Foire Saint-Laurent, Troupe de Dolet et La Place
- 1711: Arlequin Enée ou la prise de Troie, comedy in one prologue and 3 acts, Foire Saint-Laurent, Grand jeu du préau, Pantomimes
- 1714: La Matrone d'Ephèse, Foire Saint-Germain, Troupe de la Veuve Baron
- 1715: Arlequin défenseur d'Homère, one-act play, Foire Saint-Laurent
- 1717: Pierrot furieux ou Pierrot Roland, parody, Foire Saint-Germain, Jeu de Paume d'Orléans, Troupe de la Veuve Baron
- 1718: Les Animaux raisonnables (with Marc-Antoine Legrand), one-act opéra comique, Foire Saint-Germain
- 1721: Arlequin Endymion (with Alain-René Lesage and Jacques-Philippe d'Orneval), Foire Saint-Germain, Troupe de Francisque
- 1722: L'Ombre du cocher poète (with Alain-René Lesage and Jacques-Philippe d'Orneval), prologue, Foire Saint-Germain, Marionnettes
- 1722: Le Rémouleur d'amour (with Alain-René Lesage and Jacques-Philippe d'Orneval), one-act play, Foire Saint-Germain, Marionnettes
- 1722: Pierrot Romulus ou le Ravisseur poli (with Alain-René Lesage and Jacques-Philippe d'Orneval), parody, Foire Saint-Germain, Marionnettes
- 1724: Les Vacances du théâtre, one-act opéra comique, Foire Saint-Germain
- 1725: L'Audience du Temps ou l'Occasion, prologue, Foire Saint-Germain
- 1725: PIerrot Pierrette, opéra comique, Foire Saint-Germain
- 1725: Les Quatre Mariamnes, opéra comique, Foire Saint-Germain
- 1732: La Réconciliation des sens, one-act play, Foire Saint-Laurent, Opéra-Comique
- 1729: L'Enfer galant, parody, Foire Saint-Laurent
- 1733: Le Trompeur trompé, parody, Foire Saint-Germain
- 1744: Polichinelle maître d'école, parody, Foire Saint-Laurent

== Bibliography ==
=== Plays by Fuzelier ===
- Parodies du Nouveau Théâtre Italien, Paris, Briasson, 1738, 4 vol. Contient une défense des parodies, sous le titre Discours à l'occasion d'un discours de M. D. L. M. (vol. 1), et neuf des parodies de Fuzelier, dont La Rupture du Carnaval et de la Folie (1719), Hercule filant chez Omphale (1721), Arlequin Persée (1722), Le Serdeau des théâtres (1723), La Parodie, tragi-comédie (1723), Amadis le cadet (1724) et Momus exilé ou les terreurs paniques (1725).
- Les manuscrits BnF fr. 9332, 9333, 9335, 9336 et 9337 sont consacrés au « théâtre inédit de Fuzelier », et contiennent environ 75 pièces écrites seul ou en collaboration.
- La Grand-mère amoureuse, parodie d'Atys, a Marionnette parody of Lully's Atys by Louis Fuzelier dans Dorneval from 1726, éd. Susan Harvey, Middleton, A-R Éditions, 2008.
- Théâtre de la foire : anthologie de pièces inédites, 1712-1736, dir. Françoise Rubellin, Montpellier, Espaces 34, 2005, p. 83-173. Cet ouvrage contient entre autres deux pièces de Fuzelier : La Matrone d'Éphèse et Pierrot furieux ou Pierrot Roland.

=== Literature on Fuzelier and his plays ===
- Gustave Vapereau, Dictionnaire universel des littératures, Paris, Hachette, 1876, p. 845-6
- David Trott, « Pour une histoire des spectacles non officiels : Louis Fuzelier et le théâtre à Paris en 1725-1726 », Revue d'Histoire du Théâtre, 1985. 3, p. 255-275.
- David Trott, « Deux visions du théâtre: la collaboration de Lesage et Fuzelier au répertoire forain », Lesage, écrivain (1695-1735), éd. Jacques Wagner, Amsterdam, Rodopi, 1997, p. 69-79.
- David Trott, « A Dramaturgy of the unofficial stage: the non-texts of Louis Fuzelier », L'Âge du théâtre en France / The Age of Theatre in France, éd. David Trott & Nicole Boursier, Edmonton, Academic Printing and Publishing, 1988, p. 209-18.
- David Trott, « Textes et réécritures de textes : le cas des Fêtes grecques et romaines de Louis Fuzelier », Man and Nature / L'Homme et la Nature, vol. III, Edmonton, Academic Printing and Publishing, 1984, p. 77-88.
- David Trott, « Louis Fuzelier et le théâtre: vers un état présent », Revue d'Histoire littéraire de la France, vol. 83, no. 4 (juillet-août 1983), p. 604-17.
- Françoise Rubellin, « Stratégies parodiques à la Foire et aux Italiens : le dénouement d'Atys de Lully et Quinault », Le Théâtre en musique et son double (1600-1762), actes du colloque L'Académie de musique, Lully et la parodie de l'opéra réunis par D. Gambelli et L. Norci Cagiano, Paris, Champion, 2005, p. 141-190.
- Françoise Rubellin (dir.), Théâtre de la foire : anthologie de pièces inédites, 1712-1736, Montpellier, Espaces 34, 2005, p. 83-87.
- Françoise Rubellin, « Écrire pour tous les théâtres : le cas singulier de Louis Fuzelier », dans L'Opéra de Paris, la Comédie-Française et l'Opéra-Comique (1672-2010): approches comparées, dir. Sabine Chaouche, Denis Herlin et Solveig Serre, Paris, Études et rencontres de l’École des Chartes, 2012, p. 267-279.
