= Jean Aubert =

Jean Aubert may refer to:

- Jean Aubert (engineer) (1894–1984), French engineer
- Jean Aubert (architect) (c. 1680–1741), French architect
- Jean-Louis Aubert (born 1955), French musician
- Abbé Aubert (Jean-Louis Aubert, 1731–1814), French dramatist, poet and journalist

== See also ==
- Jeanne Aubert (1906–1988), French singer and actress
