= Benoni Aubert =

Danish-born Norwegian army officer

- Born: August 4, 1768; Copenhagen, Denmark
- Died: April 21, 1832; Oslo, Norway
- Military career
- Rank: Major
- Commands: Chief - Norwegian Military Academy; Commander - Engineer Regiment
- Conflicts: Napoleonic Wars

Benoni Aubert (4 August 1768 – 21 April 1832) was a Danish-born Norwegian army officer. His father was born and raised in France, and was part of its nobility. When Aubert moved to Norway, he was responsible for establishing the Aubert noble family in that country.

== Biography ==
Benoni d'Aubert was born in Copenhagen, Denmark, to Major General Jacques Xavier d'Aubert (1727–1793) and Julane Cathrine Bang (1748–1834). His father was born in France to a noble family and grew up there. He later emigrated to Denmark in 1752 to take up a career in the Royal Danish Army. Through his sons, he established the Aubert family as nobility in Denmark and Norway.

D'Aubert followed his father into the military for his career. He graduated from the Royal Danish Military Academy in Copenhagen and became an officer in 1784. He had studied engineering. He served as Chief of Engineering in Kronborg from 1806 to 1810.

From 1811–1817, d'Aubert was a commander at Kongsvinger Fortress and Blaker Fortress in Norway. In 1814, he was also Chief of the Engineer Regiment. In 1818 he was promoted to Major.

From 1822 to 1823, Aubert served as chief of the Norwegian Military Academy.

== Personal life ==
He was married in 1797 to Jakobine Henriette Thaulow (1776–1833), daughter of Kristiansand city official Henrik Arnold Thaulow (1722–1799) and his wife Jacobine (Christie) Thaulow (1746–1818). Around 1815, D'Aubert changed his surname to Aubert, and his wife and children also took the alternative version.

He and his wife had ten children together. These included professor Ludvig Cæsar Martin Aubert (1807–1887), who became a professor, and Michael Conrad Sophus Emil Aubert (1811–1872), who became an attorney and jurist.

== See also ==
- Aubert (noble family)
