= Sofie Aubert Lindbæk =

Norwegian author, teacher, and film critic

Sofie Aubert Lindbæk (19 May 1875 – 29 October 1953) was a Norwegian author, teacher, and film critic.

She was born in Christiania (now Oslo) to professor, jurist, and politician Ludvig Mariboe Benjamin Aubert (1838–1896) and author Elise Aubert (1837–1909). Her brother was Vilhelm Mariboe Aubert (1868–1908), who became a jurist.

Lindbæk graduated from Olaf Berg's lærerinneskole in Christiania in 1896. She worked as teacher until 1902, when she married Danish historian Johannes Peder Lindbæk (1872-1919) and moved with him to Denmark. They had children together before his death. After this loss, Lindbæk moved with her children back to Norway.

Lindbæk taught at Nissen Girls' School in Oslo from 1920 to 1936. She became a film critic in 1935 and continued until 1940.

Among her children were Lise Lindbæk (1905–1961), who became a journalist and war correspondent.

== Selected works ==
- Fanny Ramm, 1900
- Den yngste, 1905
- Student, 1907
- Landflygtige; af Aubert'ske papirer, 1910
- Hjemmet paa Fæstningen; af Aubert'ske papirer, 1912
- Fra Det norske selskabs kreds, 1913
- Moer Korens dagbøker, 1915
