= Hauge Church =

Church in Vestland, Norway

- Hauge kyrkje
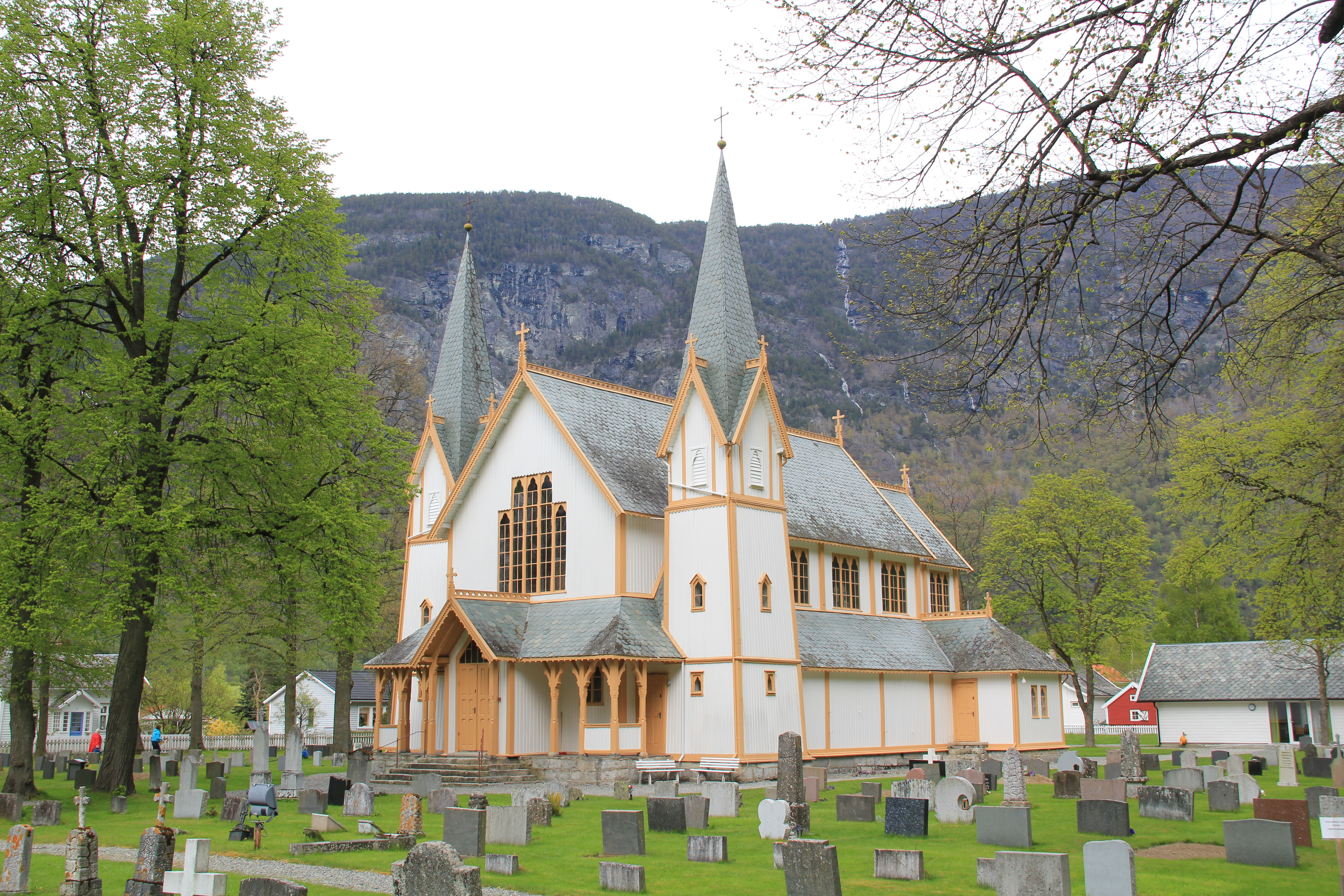
- View of the church
- Hauge Church
- 61°05′56″N 7°29′42″E
- Location: Lærdal Municipality, Vestland
- Country: Norway
- Denomination: Church of Norway
- Previous denomination: Catholic Church
- Churchmanship: Evangelical Lutheran

History
- Status: Parish church
- Founded: 13th century
- Consecrated: 6 May 1869

Architecture
- Functional status: Active
- Architect: Christian Christie
- Architectural type: Long church
- Completed: 1869 (157 years ago)

Specifications
- Capacity: 500
- Materials: Wood

Administration
- Diocese: Bjørgvin bispedømme
- Deanery: Sogn prosti
- Parish: Hauge
- Norwegian Cultural Heritage Site
- Type: Church
- Status: Listed
- ID: 84499

Hauge Church (Norwegian: Hauge kyrkje) is a parish church of the Church of Norway in Lærdal Municipality in Vestland county, Norway. It is located in the village of Lærdalsøyri. It is the church for the Hauge parish which is part of the Sogn prosti (deanery) in the Diocese of Bjørgvin. The wooden church is painted white with brownish-yellow trim. It was built in a long church design in 1869 using plans drawn up by the architect Christian Christie. The church seats about 500 people.

== History ==
The earliest existing historical records of the church date back to the year 1340, but it was not new that year. The first church was a wooden stave church that was probably built in the 13th century. Hauge Church is named after the Hauge farm where it was located. The farm sits about 2.5 kilometres (1.6 mi) southeast of the village of Lærdalsøyri. Around the mid-1600s, the old stave church was torn down and replaced with a new timber-framed long church on the same site. This new building had a nave that measured 11 by 7 metres (36 ft × 23 ft) and a square choir that measured 5.4 by 5.4 metres (18 ft × 18 ft).

Over time, the church was too small for the parish, so it was decided to build a new church. The new building would be constructed in the quickly growing village of Lærdalsøyri, about 2.5 kilometres (1.6 mi) down the valley, closer to the fjord. The name Hauge was kept as the church name even though the church was no longer located at Hauge. The church was the only church with two towers in all of the old Sogn og Fjordane county. The towers sit on either side of the main entrance to the church and it gives the church an unusually monumental character. The new church building was consecrated on 6 May 1869 by Bishop Peter Hersleb Graah Birkeland. After the new church was in use, the old church was torn down and its materials were sold to use in building barns.

== Media gallery ==
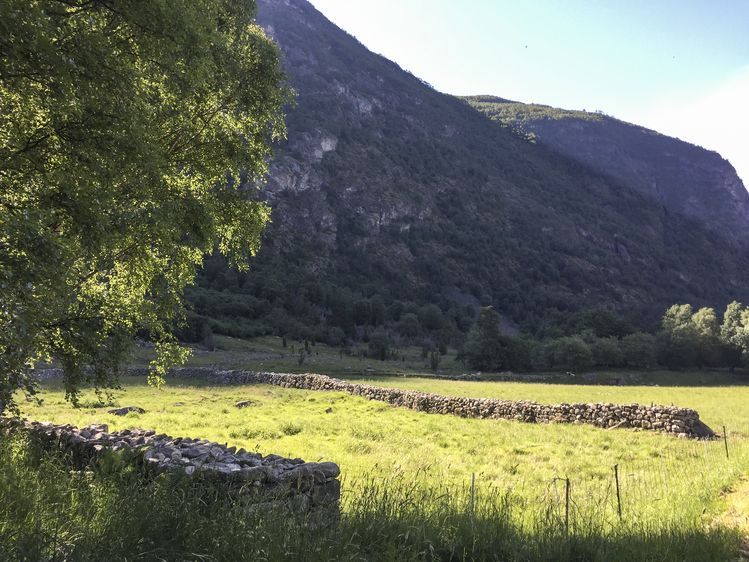
Site of the church before 1869

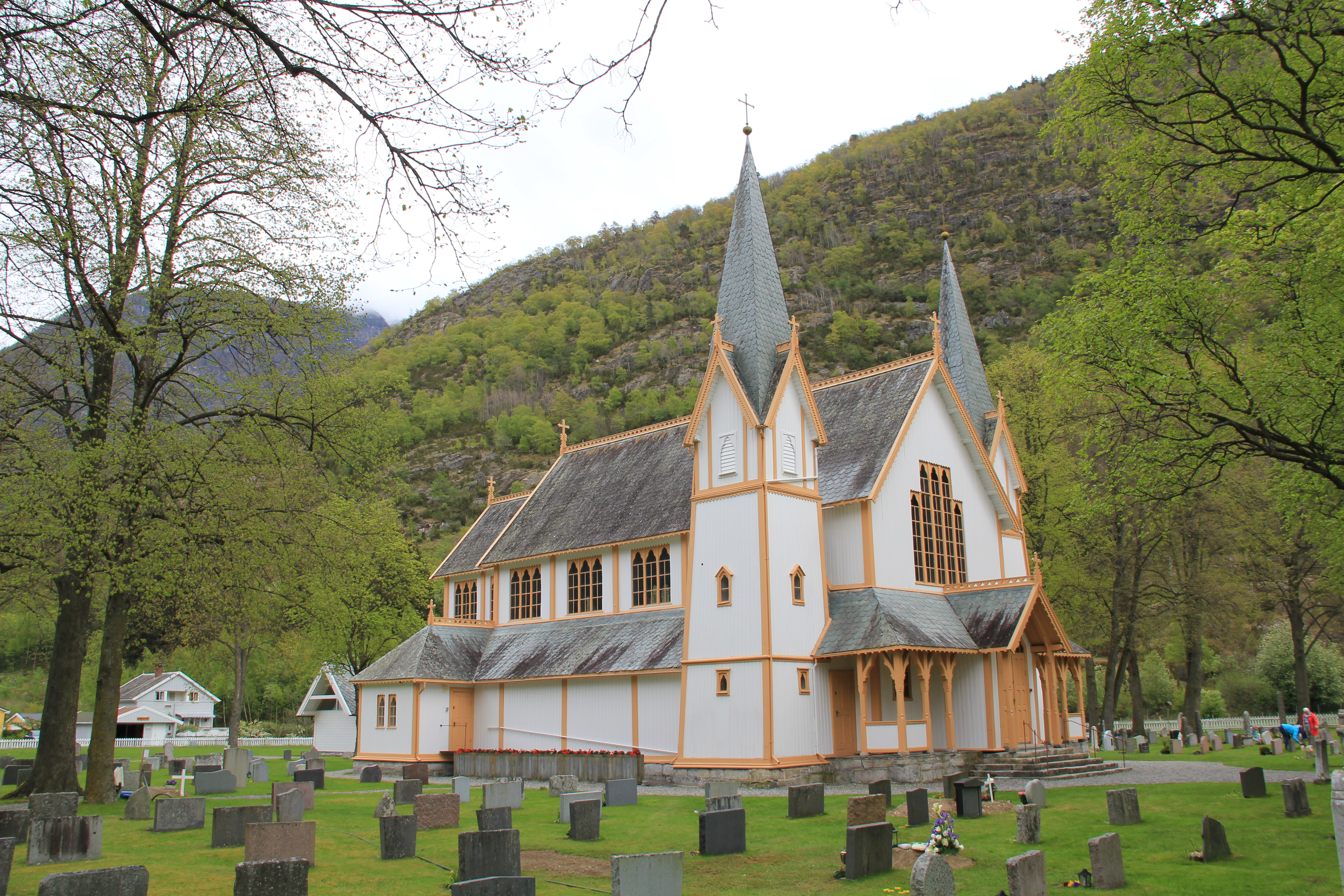

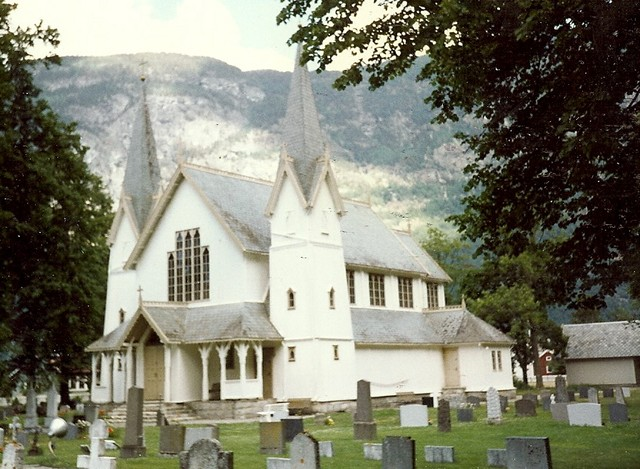

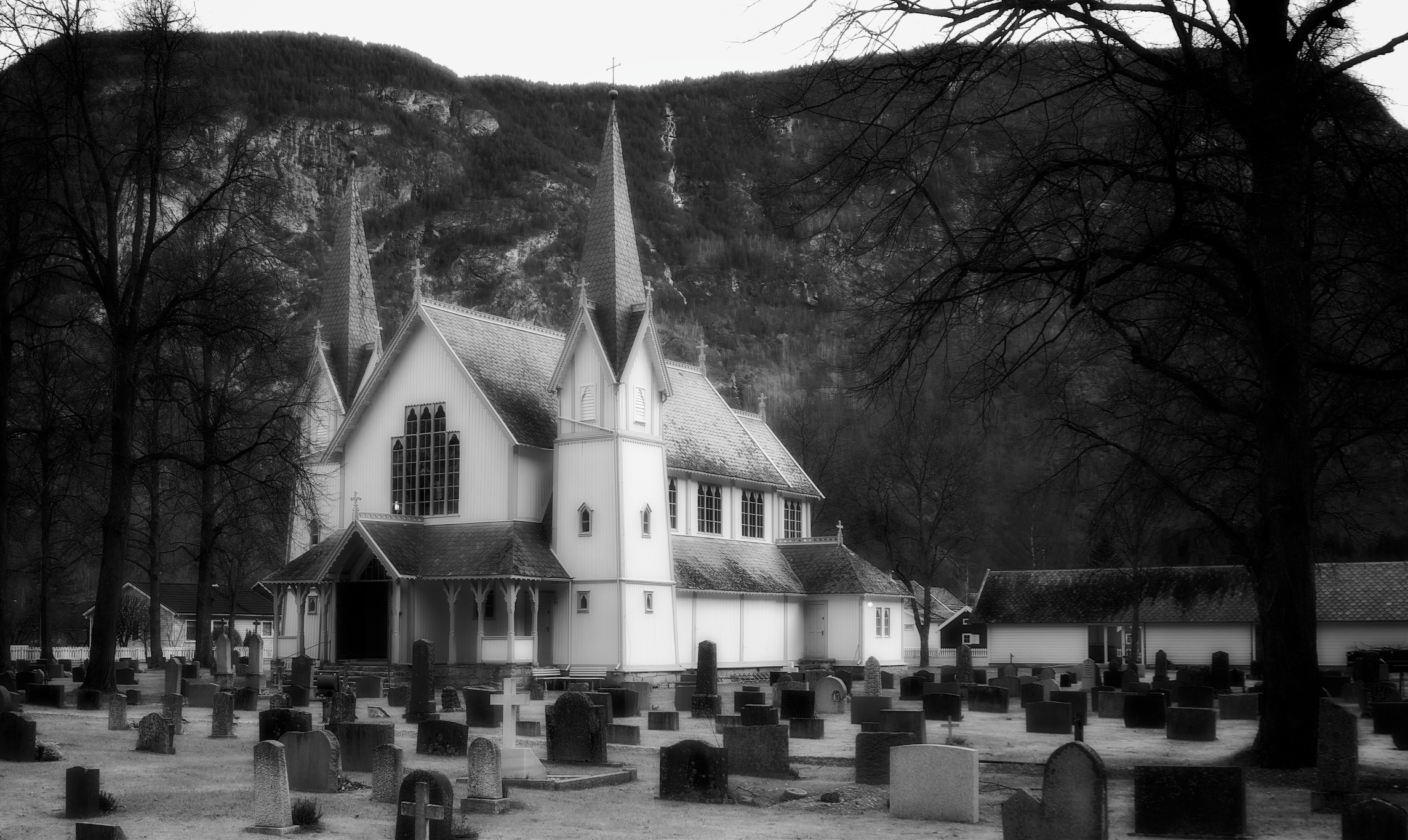

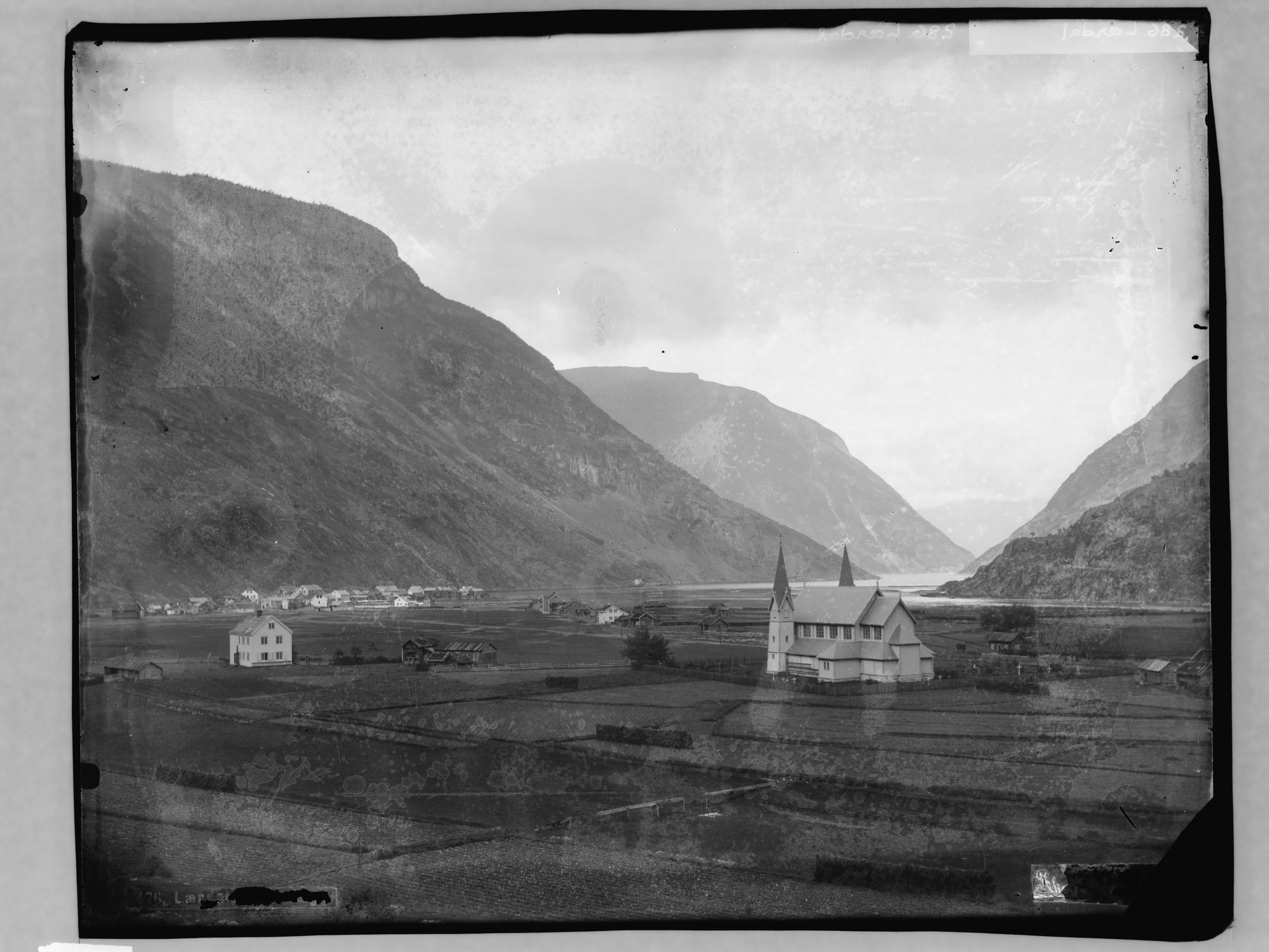

== See also ==
- List of churches in Bjørgvin
