= Sivert Christensen Strøm =

Norwegian jurist and politician (1819–1902)

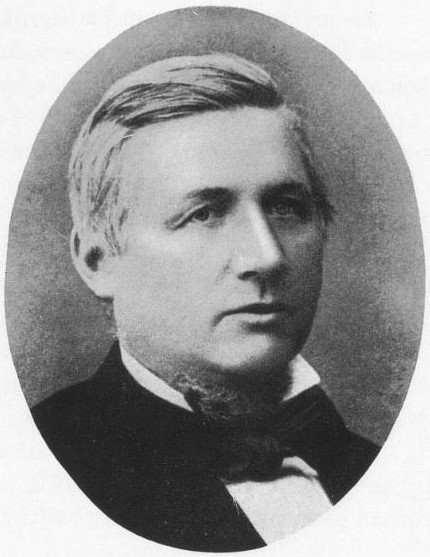
Sivert Christensen Strøm, c. 1901

Sivert Christensen Strøm (9 August 1819 – 13 November 1902) was a Norwegian jurist and politician.

He was born at Øyestad (now part of Arendal Municipality) in Nedenes county to captain Christen Nielsen Strøm. He graduated as cand.jur. in 1845. He first worked as attorney, and was then promoted to stipendiary magistrate (Norwegian: sorenskriver) in the district of Nordre Østerdalen in 1859. He became involved in politics, and was elected to the Norwegian Parliament, the Storting in 1859, 1862 and 1865, representing the constituency of Hedemarkens Amt (now Hedmark). During his last term, he was also mayor of his local municipality.

In 1867, he succeeded Michael Aubert as burgomaster of Trondhjem (now Trondheim). While serving in Trondhjem, he was elected to the Storting in 1871 and 1877. He was also a director in the Bank of Norway in 1871.

Strøm married twice and had several children.
