= Sabine Chaouche =

French scholar

Sabine Chaouche is a scholar who specializes in the history of theatre, intellectual history (histoire des idées), social and economic history.

== Biography ==
She studied at the University of Oxford (New College), where she completed a DPhil in Social and Economic History (2017) and at the Université de Paris-Sorbonne where she completed a PhD in Literature and Theatre (1999) and an Habilitation à Diriger des Recherches (2005). She taught French literature and theatre in Oxford and Kuala Lumpur.

Chaouche is a researcher primarily known for her work in cultural history, but also in intellectual history, as she has extensively examined the concept of the "theatrical," the concept of the "actor," the self in theatre, and more broadly, the philosophy of the Actor in the Age of Enlightenment. Her books on acting and declamation in the seventeenth and eighteenth centuries have become reference works. She has analysed an array of acting theories spanning from the 1650s to the 1800s. In recent years, she examined staging, creation, performance, masculinity, and the economy of entertainments.

She is a Fellow of the Royal Historical Society. She heads the book series "Biographies" and "Dictionaries and Synthesis" (17th and 18th centuries) at Éditions Classiques Garnier. She created the journal European Drama and Performance Studies. She also co-leads a major project, Les Contemporaines (1640-2000), which focuses on the history of female performers (to be published by Éditions Classiques Garnier).

== Publications ==
=== Books ===
1. L'art du comédien. Declamation et jeu scénique en France à l'âge classique (Paris: Éditions Honoré Champion, 2001), reed. 2013, 456 pages.
2. La philosophie de l'Acteur. La dialectique de l'intérieur et de l'extérieur dans les écrits sur l'art théâtral français (1738-1801) (Paris: Éditions Honoré Champion, 2007), 480 pages.
3. La mise en scène du répertoire à la Comédie-Française (1680-1815) (Paris: Éditions Honoré Champion, 2013), 2 volumes, 960 pages.
4. Student Consumer Culture in Nineteenth-Century Oxford, New York, Palgrave Macmillan/Springer, 2020, 318 pages.

=== Edited volumes ===
1. Le Théâtral de la France d'Ancien Régime. De la présentation de soi à la représentation scénique (Paris: Éditions Honoré Champion, 2010), 544 pages.
2. L'Opéra de Paris, la Comédie-Française, l'Opéra Comique (1672-2010) : approches comparées, co-ed with Solveig Serre et Denis Herlin (Geneva, Droz, 2012), 424 pages.
3. Le développement du "grand spectacle" en France: Politiques, gestions, innovations. 1715-1864, co-ed. with Roxane Martin, European Drama and Performance Studies, n°1 (2013), 330 pages.
4. Consuming Female Performers (1850s-1950s), co-ed. with Clara Sadoun-Edouard, European Drama and Performance Studies, n°5:2 (2015), 383 pages.
5. Jean-François Regnard, Théâtre français (Paris: Éditions Classiques Garnier, 2015), vol. 1, 687 pages.
6. Jean-François Regnard, Théâtre français (Paris: Éditions Classiques Garnier, 2015), vol. 2, 557 pages.
7. L'Eclairage au théâtre, co-ed. with Jean-Yves Vialleton, Revue d'Histoire du Théâtre, n°273, 2017, 144 pages.
8. Ecrire pour la scène, co-ed. with Estelle Doudet and Olivier Spina, European Drama and Performance Studies, n°9, 2017, 304 pages.
9. Jean-François Regnard, Théâtre français (Paris: Éditions Classiques Garnier), vol. 3, 2018, 413 pages.
10. Masculinité et théâtre, European Drama and Performance Studies, n°10, 2018.
11. The Stage and its Creative Processes, European Drama and Performance Studies, n° 13, volume 1, 2019.
12. The Stage and its Creative Processes, European Drama and Performance Studies, vol. 2, n° 14, 2020.
13. Les Emotions en scène (XVIIe-XXIe siècle) avec Laurence Marie. European Drama and Performance Studies, vol. 2, n° 17, 2021. 393 pp.
14. Molière and After: Aspects of the Theatrical Enterprise in 17th- and 18th-century France. avec Jan Clarke. European Drama and Performance Studies, vol. 1, n°18, 2022. 413pp.
15. Economy and Creation of Stage Costumes (16th-19th century). European Drama and Performance Studies, vol. 1, n° 20, 2023. 375pp.
16. Stage and Plate. Eating and Starving in European Drama and Theatre (16th–19th Century). With Clara Edouard. European Drama and Performance Studies, vol. 2, n° 23, 2024. 431 pp.
17. Material Cultures in Southeast Asia. Objects in Contexts. Routledge. 2025. 172 pp.
18. Iconic Attitudes. Music, Masculinity, and Theatrical Performance (1960s-2020s). European Drama and Performance Studies, vol. 1, n° 26, 2026. 346 pp.

=== Scholarly editions ===
1. Denis Diderot, Paradoxe sur le comédien (Paris: Flammarion, 2000), 317 pages.
2. Sept Traités sur le jeu du comédien et autres textes. De l'actio oratoire à l'art dramatique, 1657-1750 (Paris: Éditions Honoré Champion, 2001), 880 pages.
3. La scène en contrechamp. Anecdotes françaises et traditions de jeu au siècle des Lumières (Paris: Éditions Honoré Champion, 2005, 160 pages.
4. Ecrits sur l'art théâtral, Spectateurs, 1753-1801 (Paris: Éditions Honoré Champion, 2005), 784 pages.
5. Ecrits sur l'art théâtral, Acteurs, 1753-1801 (Paris: Éditions Honoré Champion, 2005), 1024 pages.
6. Lettres à Eugénie, Lettres à Eulalie, Dialogue des Morts, in Prince de Ligne. Ecrits sur la société, ed. by J. V. Vercruysse (éd.) (Paris: Éditions Honoré Champion, 2010), 968 pages.
7. Relevés de mise en scène (1686-1823), Comédie-Française (Paris: Éditions Honoré Champion, 2015), 704 pages.
8. Les Folies amoureuses followed by Mariage de la Folie, in Jean-François Regnard, Théâtre français (Paris: Éditions Classiques Garnier, 2015), vol. 2.
9. Le Retour imprévu, in Théâtre français (Paris: Éditions Classiques Garnier, 2015), vol. 2.
10. La Sérénade, in Jean-François Regnard, Théâtre français (Paris: Éditions Classiques Garnier, 2015), vol. 1.
11. Le Joueur, in Jean-François Regnard, Théâtre français (Paris: Éditions Classiques Garnier, 2015), vol. 1.
12. Le Distrait, in Jean-François Regnard, Théâtre français (Paris: Éditions Classiques Garnier, 2015), vol. 1.
13. Le Légataire universel, in Jean-François Regnard, Théâtre français (Paris: Éditions Classiques Garnier, 2018), vol. 3 (co-ed. S. Requemora).
14. La Critique du Légataire, in Jean-François Regnard, Théâtre français (Paris: Éditions Classiques Garnier, 2018), vol. 3.
15. Les Souhaits, in Jean-François Regnard, Théâtre français (Paris: Éditions Classiques Garnier, 2018), vol. 3.
16. Les Vendanges ou le Bailli d’Asnières, in Jean-François Regnard, Théâtre français (Paris: Éditions Classiques Garnier, 2018), vol. 3 (co-ed. N. Courtès).

=== Articles and chapters ===
- 'Les tragédies religieuses de Racine : une ponctuation de l’émotion ?. Papers on French Seventeenth Century Literature, 32, 63 (2005), 441–465.
- ‘L’économie du luxe ou le théâtre recyclé. L’intendance des Menus-Plaisirs par Papillon de la Ferté’, XVIIIe Siècle, 40 (2008), 395–412.
- ‘Cachez ce Moi que je ne voudrais voir : de la philosophie de l'art à la philosophie de l'esprit’, in Archéologie du Moi, ed. by Gisèle Berkman & Caroline Jacot Grapa (Paris: Presses de Vincennes, 2009), 41–60.
- 'Le 'Romain' au Théâtre des XVIIe et XVIIIe Siècles: Naissance d'un Type Comique, French Studies, XLVI :2 (2012), 163–177. doi:10.1093/fs/knr266
- 'Mise en scène de l'univers du spectacle. Formes du Théâtral diderotien’, Recherches sur Diderot et sur l'Encyclopédie, 47 (2012), 105–117.
- ‘Rééditer les chefs-d’œuvre dramatiques au XVIIIe siècle. Métamorphose du frontispice en Europe’. In Le discours du livre. Mise en scène du texte et fabrique de l’œuvre sous l’Ancien Régime, ed. by A. Arzoumanov, A. Réach-Ngô, T. Tran (Paris: Garnier, 2012), 111–137.
- ‘La mise en scène de soi et du texte au miroir des anecdotes dramatiques: théorie subreptice ou 'théâtral' insolite?’. In Anecdotes dramatiques De la Renaissance aux Lumières, ed. by François Lercercle, Sophie Marchand, Zoé Schweitzer (Paris: Presses Universitaires de la Sorbonne, 2012), 41–51.
- ‘Nous philosopherons maintenant tout le soul', L'Ecrivain et le philosophe, Travaux de Littérature, XXVII (2014), 41–51.
- 'De l’anecdote croustillante à l’allégorie pornographique : la comédienne, femme de petite vertu. Obscène en scène, Revue d’Histoire du Théâtre, 2016, 16–27.
- ‘The Phenomenology of Acting: Cognitive and Creative Spaces in 18th-century Theories’. EDPS, 13:2 (2019). 69–90. doi:10.15122/isbn.978-2-406-09706-8.p.0069
- ‘L’acteur et la création. Modeler le sentiment’, EDPS, 14 :1 (2020), 49–66. doi:10.15122/isbn.978-2-406-10380-6.p.0049
- ‘Work in Progress and Creativity in Performance’, EDPS, 14 :1 (2020), 25-48.
- ‘La construction de la masculinité au XVIIe siècle. Le rôle de l’irrévérence et de l’offense verbale chez Molière et Regnard’, Studi Francesi, 190 (2020), 23-39.
- ‘La tragédie au prisme du genre. L’idée de masculinité d’après La Poétique de Jules Pilet de la Mesnardière’, Littératures Classiques, 103 (2021), 71–80
- ‘Expressionist Acting Paroxysmal Emotions at Play on the Late 18th-Century French Stage’, EDPS, 17:2 (2021), 97–124. doi:10.48611/isbn.978-2-406-12207-4.p.0097
- ‘The Trade Relations of the Comédie-Française Economic Networks and the Consumption of Goods before the Revolution’, EDPS, 18:1 (2022), 105–164, doi:10.48611/isbn.978-2-406-12918-9.p.0105
- ‘Live Performance as a Multiverse’, Junctures, 22 (2022), 90–97.
- ‘Acting through the Lens of the Press Impulsive Styles, Truthful Tones and Scenic Expressivity in Eighteenth-Century France’, EDPS, 19:2 (2022), 305–367. doi:10.48611/isbn.978-2-406-13546-3.p.03052
- ‘Acting Style’, in Molière in Context, J. Clarke (ed.) (Cambridge: Cambridge University Press, 2022), 154–161.
- ‘Theatre and Consumption’, in Molière in Context, J. Clarke (ed.) (Cambridge: Cambridge University Press, 2022), 162–172.
- 'Material and Economic History of Costume at the Comédie-Française. The Bills from the Tailor Pontus (1757–1792), EDPS, 20, 2023, 123–215
