= Jacques Aubert =

French composer and violinist (1689–1753)

Jacques Aubert (30 September 1689 – 19 May 1753), also known as Jacques Aubert le Vieux (Jacques Aubert the Elder), was a French composer and violinist of the Baroque period. From 1727 to 1746, he was a member of the Vingt-quatre Violons du Roy; from 1728 to 1752, he was the first violinist with the Paris Opera orchestra; and from 1729 to 1740, he frequently and successfully appeared as a soloist with the Concert Spirituel, performing, among other works, concertos for violin and orchestra of his own composition.

== Biography ==
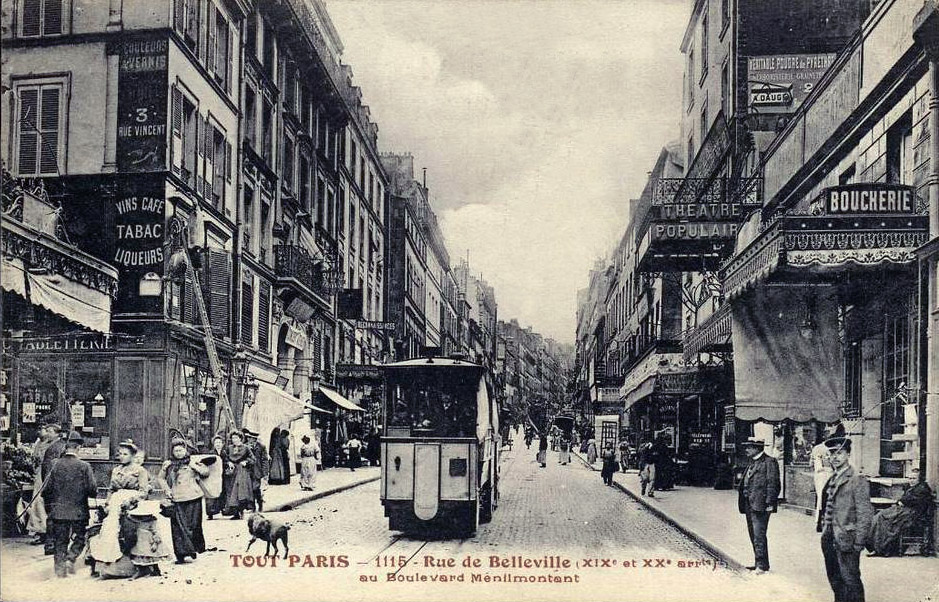
Jacques Aubert was from Belleville, Paris, a small neighborhood in acre count that lies between Main Street and the Rue de Belleville

Aubert was born in Paris and was probably the son of Jean Aubert, a member of the 24 Violins du Roi until his death in 1710. Jacques was a student of Jean Baptiste Senaillé. In 1717 he is known to have been working in the Théâtres de la Foire, as a violinist and dancing-master, and had composed at least five ballets and comedies. In 1719 he married Marie Louise Lecat, published a book of violin sonatas and began working for Louis Henri, Duke of Bourbon and Prince of Condé.

In 1727, Aubert replaced Noel Converset, a well-respected violinist in the Violons du Roi, and remained a member until 1746. Within a year he joined orchestra of the Paris Opera, at the time known as the Académie Royale de Musique, becoming first violinist and remaining there for the next 24 years. He made his debut with the Concert Spirituel in 1729.

His son, Louis Aubert (painter) (1720-c.1800), was also a violinist and composer. Another son, Jean-Louis Aubert (1731–1814) was a dramatist, poet and journalist, also known as the Abbé Aubert. Aubert's oldest son, Louis, was greatly influenced by the Italian style of music. As a back-desk violinist, he played a major role in showing how much impact his father had on format and techniques in music. With such drive in styles within Italian methodology, he participated in many concerto and sonata premiers.

Aubert also highlighted many French elements in his music. Using forms such as the gavotte and minuet, he wrote out the slow middle movements in full and published them as solo pieces.

Together with Jean-Joseph Cassanéa de Mondonville and Jean-Marie Leclair, Aubert brought the zest of Italian violin virtuosity into the French musical fare of their time. He died in Belleville, near Paris.

== Works ==
=== Instrumental notation ===
- Pieces for two violins Trio sonatas
- Five books of sonatas for violin and basso continuo
- Twelve Suites of concerts de Symphonie (1730)
- Concertos for 4 violins and bass, (the first in this genre by a French composer)
- Les Amuzettes, pièces pour les vièles, musettes, violons, flutes et hautbois. Op. XIV, Paris ca. 1734
- Les petits concerts. Duos pour les musettes, vielles, violons, flutes et hautbois. Op. XVI, Paris ca. 1734
- op.1 (1719) op. 2 (1721)
- op. 3 (1723)
- op.4 (1731)
- V livre de [6] sonates, vn, bc, op. 25 (1738)
- Pieces, 2 fl/vn, premiere suite (1723)
- Some for fl

=== Operas, ballets, and creative works ===
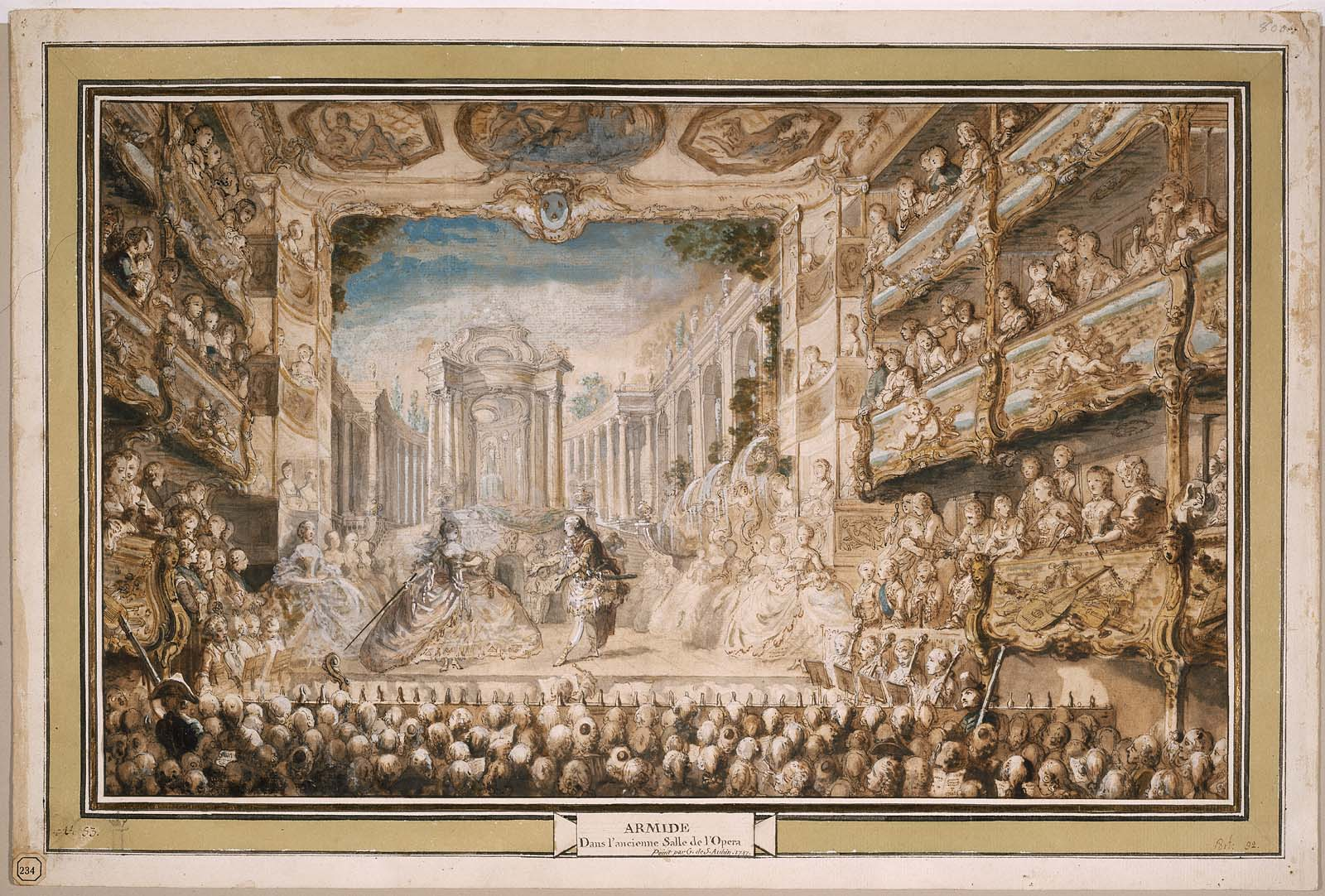
Theatre of the Paris Opera in the Palais-Royal, where Jacques Aubert served as a primary violinist from 1728 to 1752

- Arlequin gentilhomme malgré lui ou L'Amant supposé, opéra comique (1716 Paris)
- Arlequin Hulla ou La Femme répudiée, opéra comique (1716 Paris)
- Les Animaux raisonnables (Louis Fuzelier/Marc-Antoine Legrand), opéra comique (1718 Paris)
- Diane (Antoine Danchet), divertissement (1721 Chantilly)
- Le Regiment de la calotte (Fuzelier/LeSage/d'Orneval), opéra comique (1721 Paris)
- La Fête royale divertissement (1722 Chantilly)
- Le Ballett de Chantilly, Le Ballet des vingt-quatre heures (LeGrand), comedy (1722 Chantilly)
- La Reine des Péris (Fuzelier), Persian comedy (1725 Paris)
- Les amuzettes, vielles/musettes/vns/fls/obs, op.14 (c1733)
- Les petits concerts, musettes/vielles/vns/fls/obs, op.16(1734)
- ed. J. Harf( Wilhelmshaven,1975)
- [6] Concerto, 4 vn, vc, bc, op.17 (1734)
- 6 symphonies a quarte, 3 vn, bs, op. 2 (1755)
- 2 ed. R. Blanchard (Paris, 1973)
