= Lærdalsøyri =

Village in Vestland, Norway

- Village
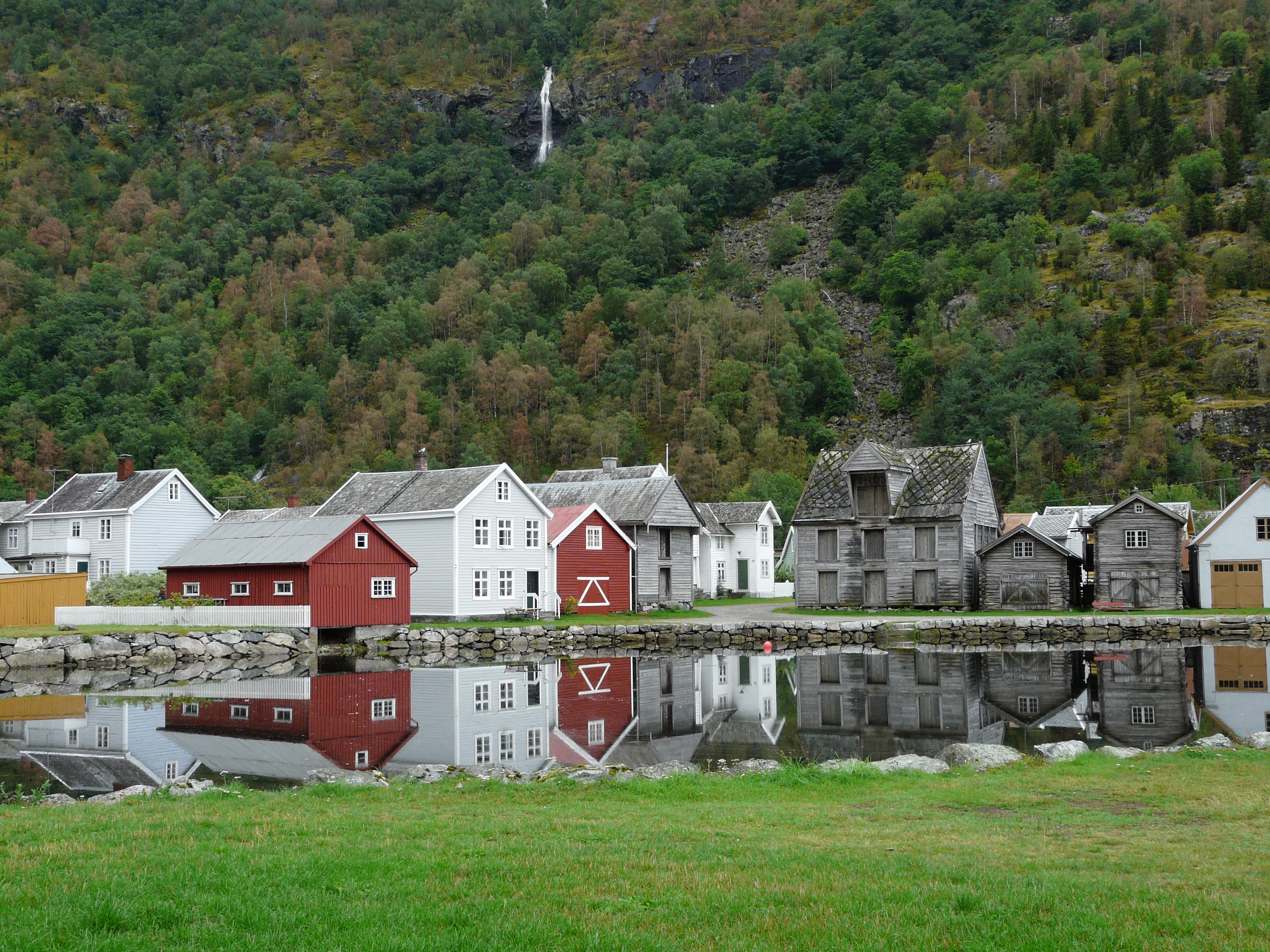
- View of Lærdalsøyri
- Interactive map of Lærdalsøyri
- Location within Vestland Location within Norway
- Coordinates: 61.1000°N 7.4737°E
- Country: Norway
- Region: Western Norway
- County: Vestland
- District: Sogn
- Municipality: Lærdal Municipality

Area
  - Total: 1.01 km^{2} (0.39 sq mi)
- Elevation: 3 m (9.8 ft)

Population (2025)
  - Total: 1,218
  - Density: 1,206/km^{2} (3,120/sq mi)
- Time zone: UTC+01:00 (CET)
  - Summer (DST): UTC+02:00 (CEST)
- Post Code: 6887 Lærdal

Lærdalsøyri is the administrative centre of Lærdal Municipality in Vestland county, Norway. The village is located along the Lærdalselvi river where it empties into the Lærdalsfjorden, a branch off of the main Sognefjorden. The village is located about 4 kilometres (2.5 mi) north of the village of Tønjum at the east end of the Lærdal Tunnel which is part of the European route E16 highway. It sits about 25 kilometres (16 mi) northwest of the village of Borgund and about 15 kilometres (9.3 mi) across the fjord from the village of Kaupanger in Sogndal Municipality. Hauge Church is located in the village, and serves as the main church for the parish.

The 1.01-square-kilometre (250-acre) village has a population (2025) of 1,218 and a population density of 1,206 inhabitants per square kilometre (3,120/sq mi).

== History ==
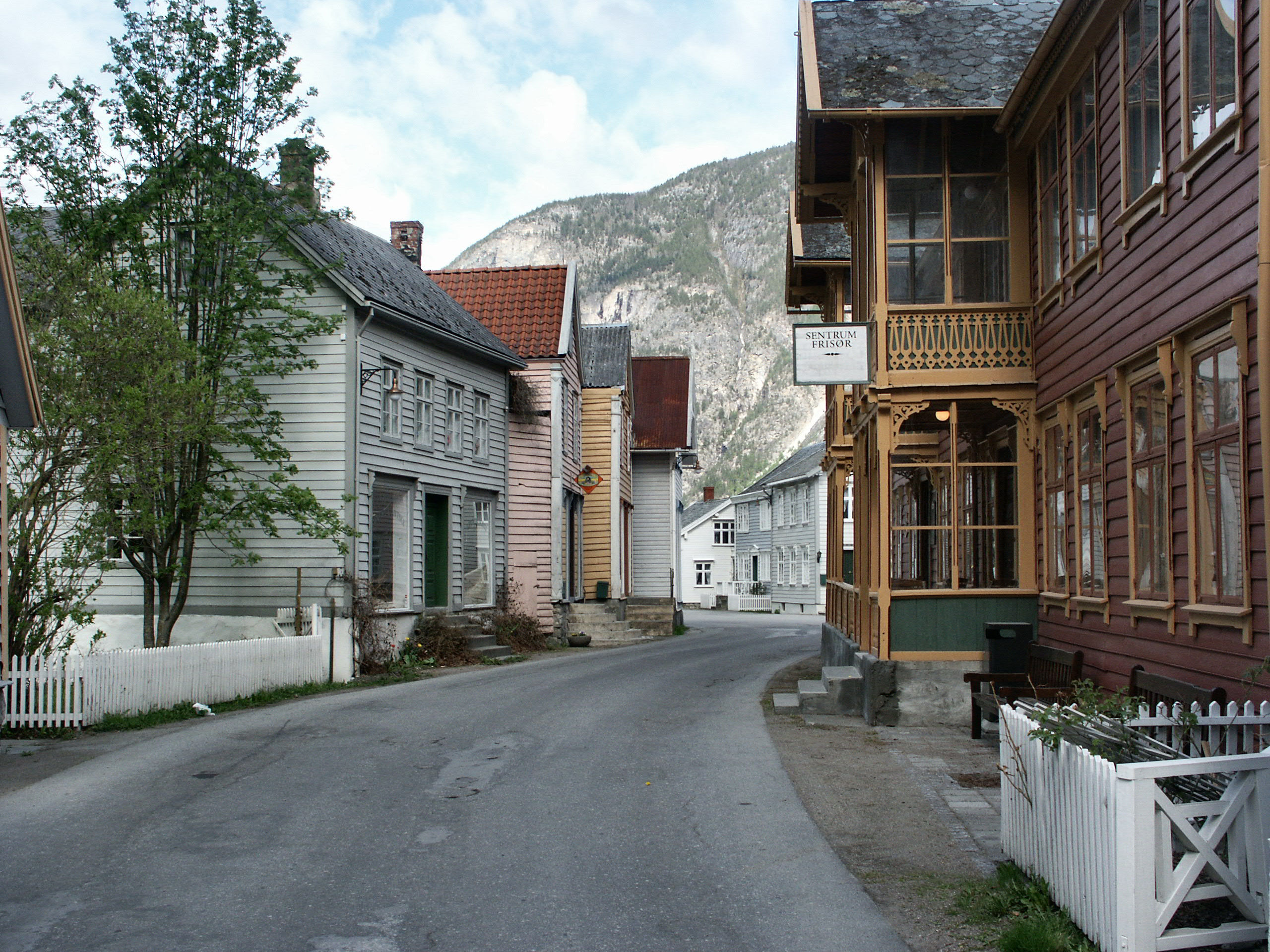
View of some of the old village

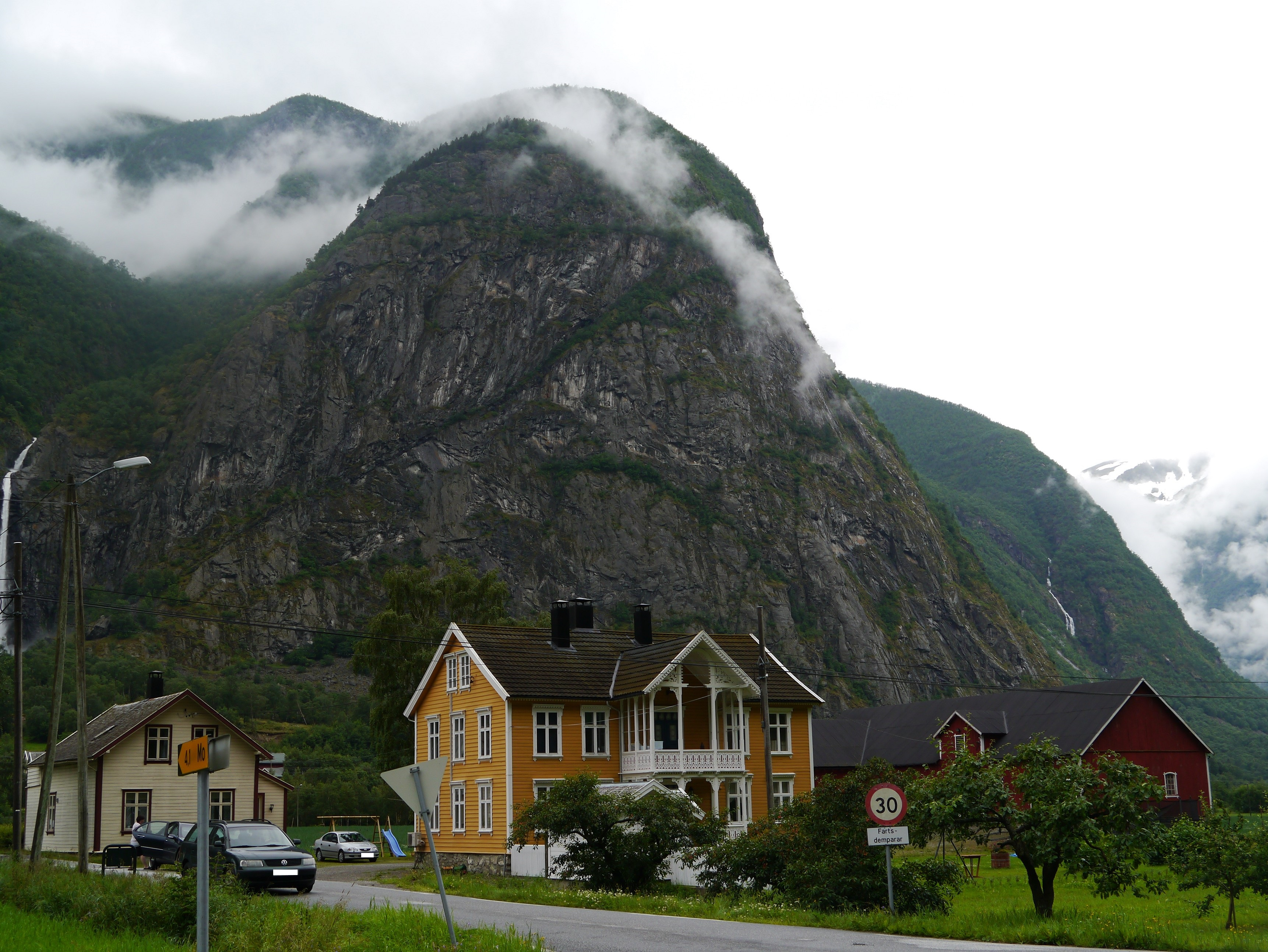
Another view of the village

The village center is listed as a national "heritage village" and tourists come to see the old city center with its 161 wooden houses that date from 1700 to 1800. The old village of Lærdalsøyri used to be a major trading port between east and west in Norway. It is located near the head of Sognefjord, one of the longest fjords in Norway, which meant sea-going ships could carry goods deep inland before landing them at the village for the overland journey into eastern Norway.

Historically, several of the County Governors of Nordre Bergenhus lived in Lærdalsøyri while in office including Christian Ulrik Kastrup, Michael Conrad Sophus Emil Aubert, and Johan Collett Falsen.

=== 2014 fire ===
At 22:56 (10:56 pm) on 18 January 2014, local fire departments were alerted to a fire in a residence on the Kyrkjegata road. Winds fanned the flames towards the town center, and the fire spread to a nearby forest, threatening the Old Lærdalsøyri heritage area. The town was evacuated at 00:30 (12:30 am), with residents evacuated to a hotel in the neighboring Aurland Municipality. By 04:00 in the morning, over thirty houses were in flames.

=== Name ===
The name Lærdalsøyri is derived from the local river which flows through the village. The first element is the genitive case of the old name of the river Lærr (now the river is called Lærdalselvi) and the last element is dalr which means "valley" or "dale." The meaning of the old river name is unknown. The last element is øyri which is the finite form of øyr which means "sandbank"; it is similar to the word ayre which is used in Scotland and Orkney.

== Climate ==
Lærdal Municipality is situated near the head of Sognefjorden. The very long fjord snakes past mountain ranges on its way from the sea inland to Lærdal, and the mountains create a rain shadow effect for the innermost part of the fjord, making Lærdal much drier than the coast, with just 20% of Bergen's precipitation. The mountains also sometimes gives a föhn effect in winter for Lærdal. The climate of Lærdal is a thus a mix of oceanic and continental features. Lærdal has a humid continental climate, or a temperate oceanic climate (Cfb), depending on winter threshold (0 °C (32 °F) as used in US or −3 °C (27 °F) as in the original Köppen climate classification). The record high 33.4 °C (92.1 °F) was recorded both July 2018 and July 2019. The all-time low −21.8 °C (−7.2 °F) is from January 1942.

Climate data for Lærdal 1991-2020 (2 m, Lærdal IV, extremes 1871-2020 includes earlier stations)
Month	Jan	Feb	Mar	Apr	May	Jun	Jul	Aug	Sep	Oct	Nov	Dec	Year
Record high °C (°F)	15.9 (60.6)	15.3 (59.5)	16.8 (62.2)	21.5 (70.7)	28.3 (82.9)	31 (88)	33.4 (92.1)	31 (88)	25.1 (77.2)	23.6 (74.5)	18.7 (65.7)	16.2 (61.2)	33.4 (92.1)
Mean daily maximum °C (°F)	1.5 (34.7)	2.0 (35.6)	5.8 (42.4)	11.1 (52.0)	15.5 (59.9)	19.1 (66.4)	21.3 (70.3)	19.7 (67.5)	15.3 (59.5)	9.2 (48.6)	4.7 (40.5)	2.0 (35.6)	10.6 (51.1)
Daily mean °C (°F)	−0.7 (30.7)	−0.7 (30.7)	2.3 (36.1)	6.4 (43.5)	10.2 (50.4)	13.6 (56.5)	15.9 (60.6)	14.8 (58.6)	10.9 (51.6)	5.9 (42.6)	2.2 (36.0)	−0.5 (31.1)	6.7 (44.0)
Mean daily minimum °C (°F)	−2.5 (27.5)	−2.7 (27.1)	−0.9 (30.4)	2.5 (36.5)	5.7 (42.3)	9.2 (48.6)	11.9 (53.4)	11.3 (52.3)	8.2 (46.8)	3.6 (38.5)	0.6 (33.1)	−1.8 (28.8)	3.8 (38.8)
Record low °C (°F)	−21.8 (−7.2)	−21.1 (−6.0)	−16.7 (1.9)	−8.8 (16.2)	−2.5 (27.5)	−0.6 (30.9)	3.3 (37.9)	2.8 (37.0)	−2.5 (27.5)	−10.5 (13.1)	−16.7 (1.9)	−19.4 (−2.9)	−21.8 (−7.2)
Average precipitation mm (inches)	45.8 (1.80)	25.8 (1.02)	32.1 (1.26)	27.3 (1.07)	29.6 (1.17)	43.7 (1.72)	50 (2.0)	57 (2.2)	55.3 (2.18)	49.3 (1.94)	44.7 (1.76)	47.5 (1.87)	508.1 (19.99)
Average precipitation days (≥ 1.0 mm)	9	8	7	5	7	9	9	10	11	9	8	8	100
Source 1: Norwegian Meteorological Institute/eklima (extremes) yr.no/met.no (means and precipitation)
Source 2: Weatheronline climate robot (average highs/lows)

== Media gallery ==
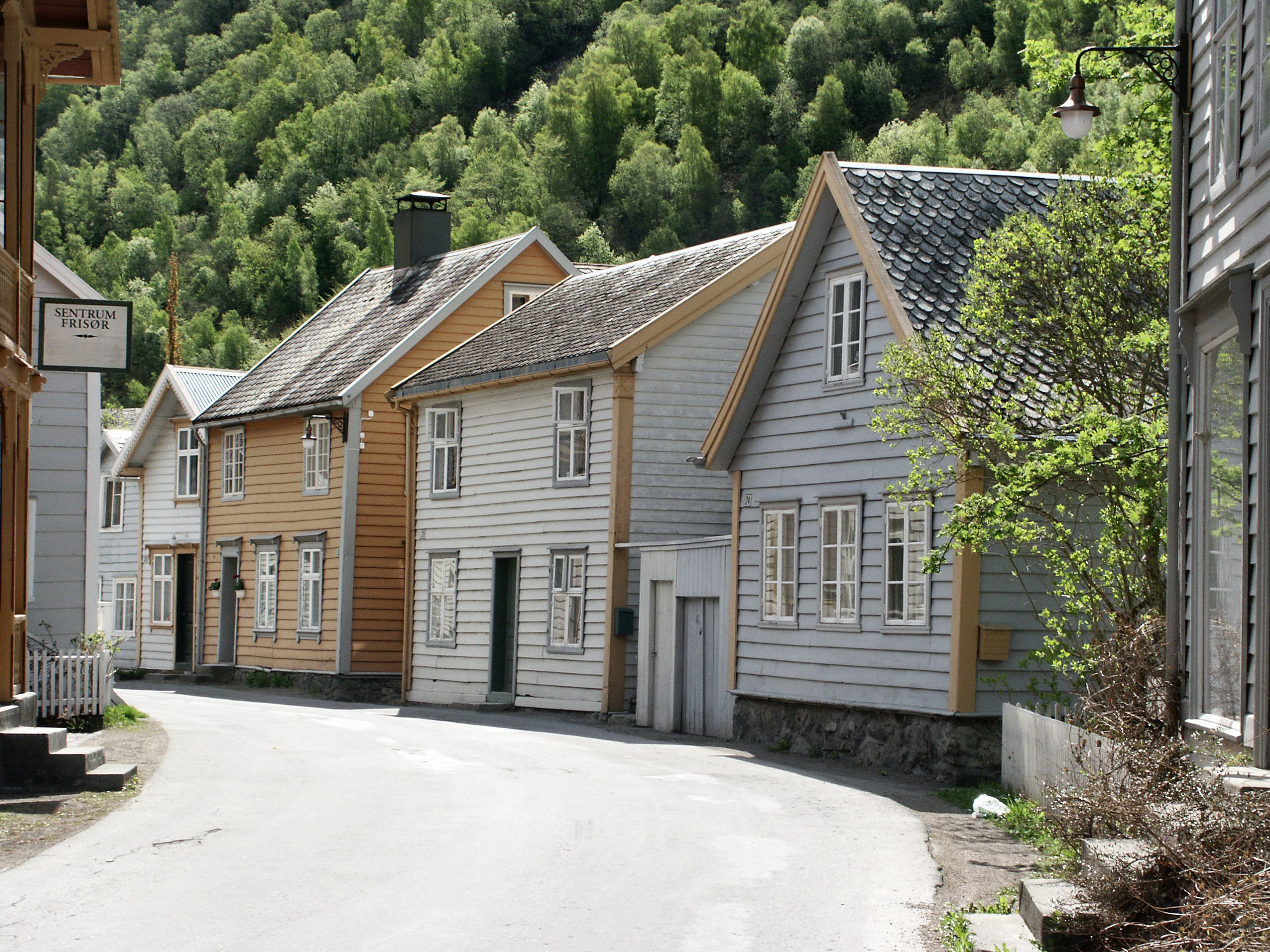
Some old houses in Lærdalsøyri

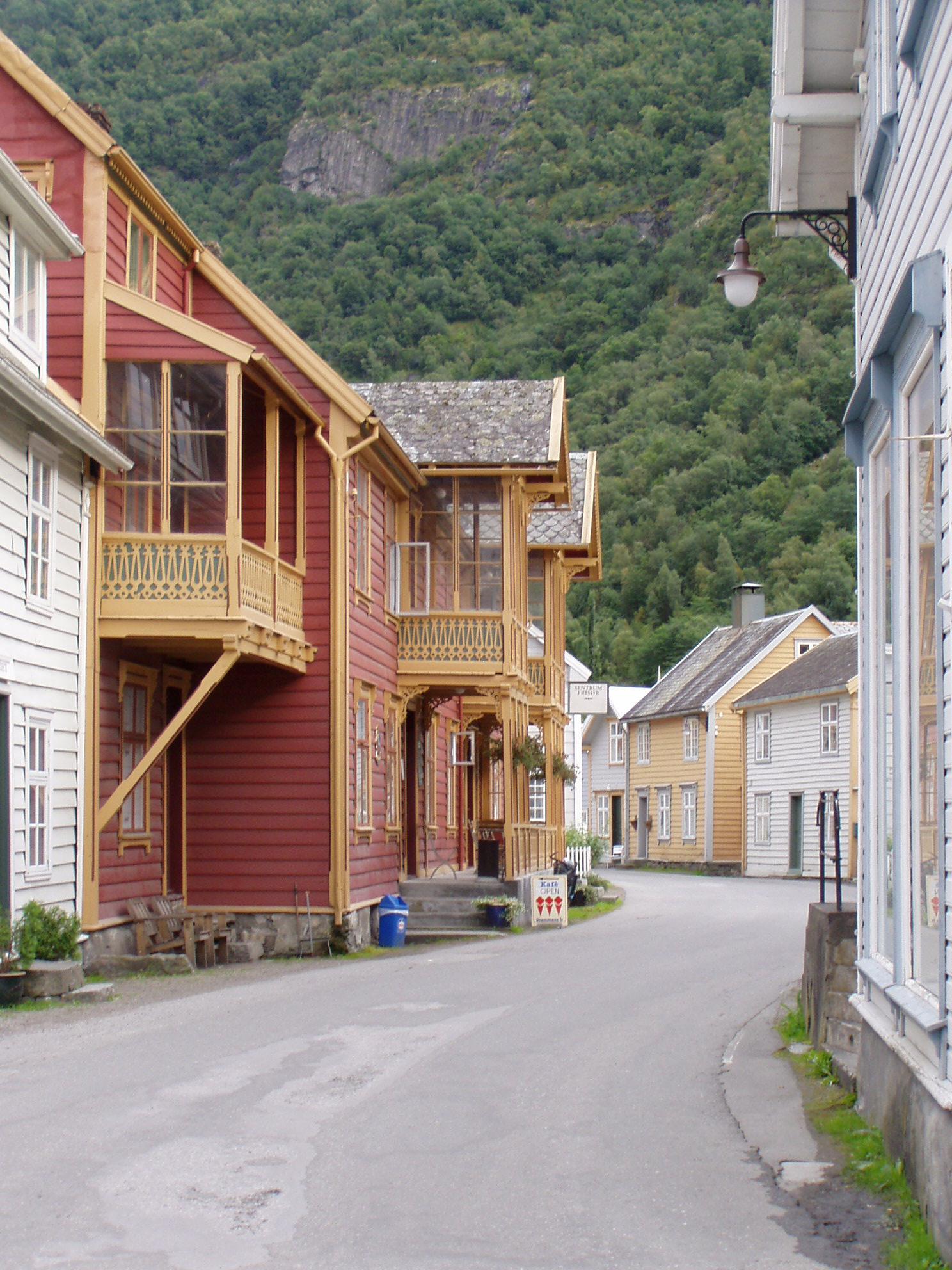
Street in Lærdalsøyri

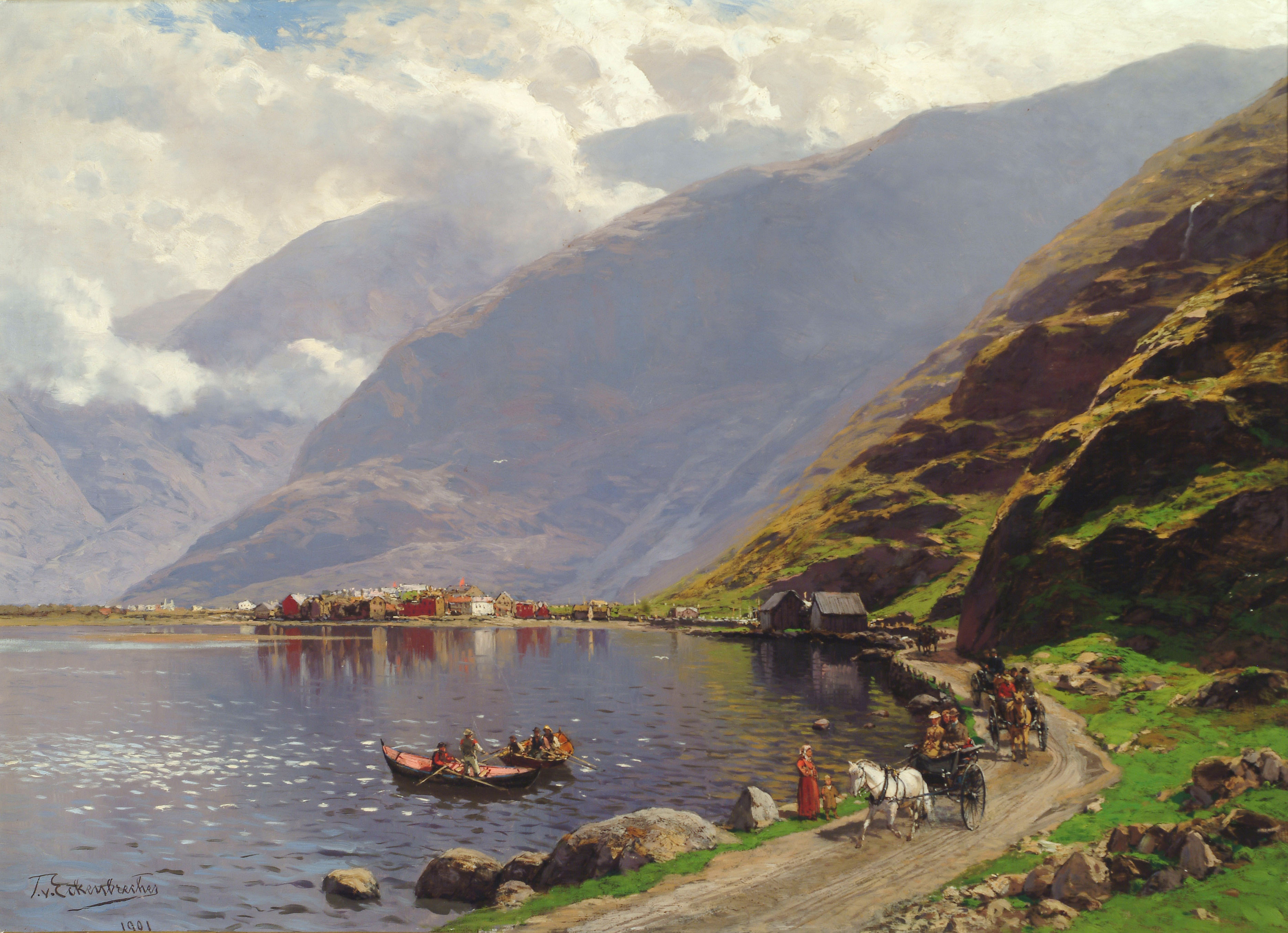
Painting of Lærdalsøyri in 1901

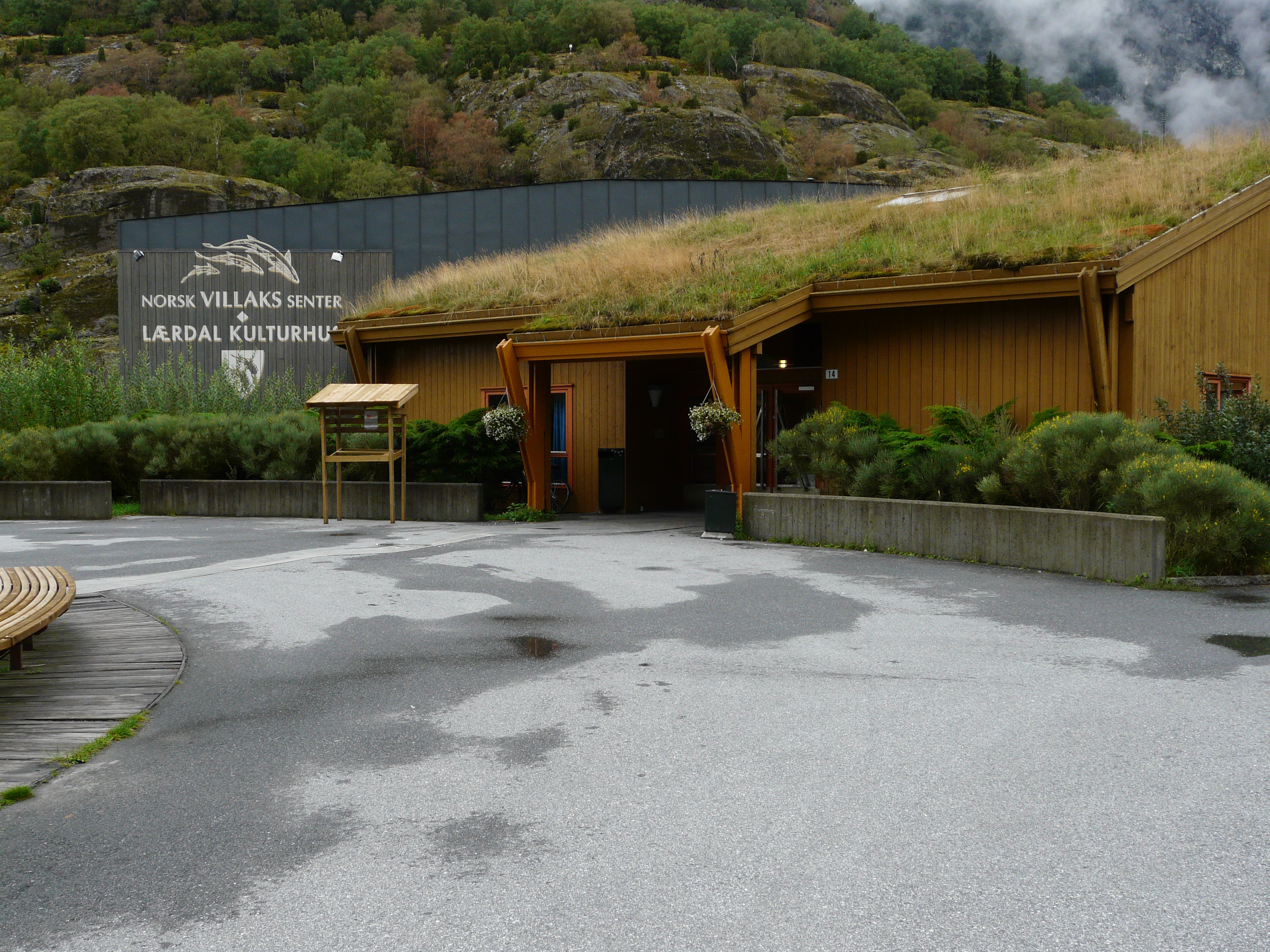
Norsk Villakssenter

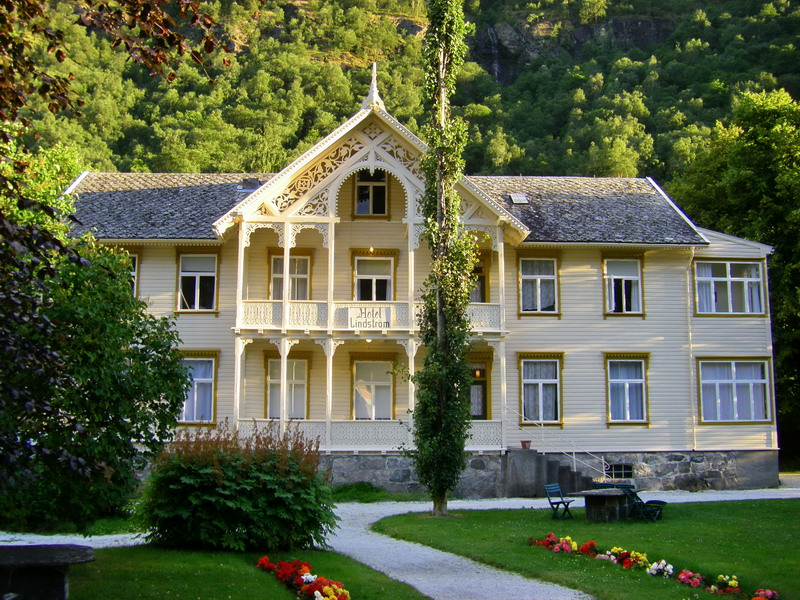
View of a building on Oyragata

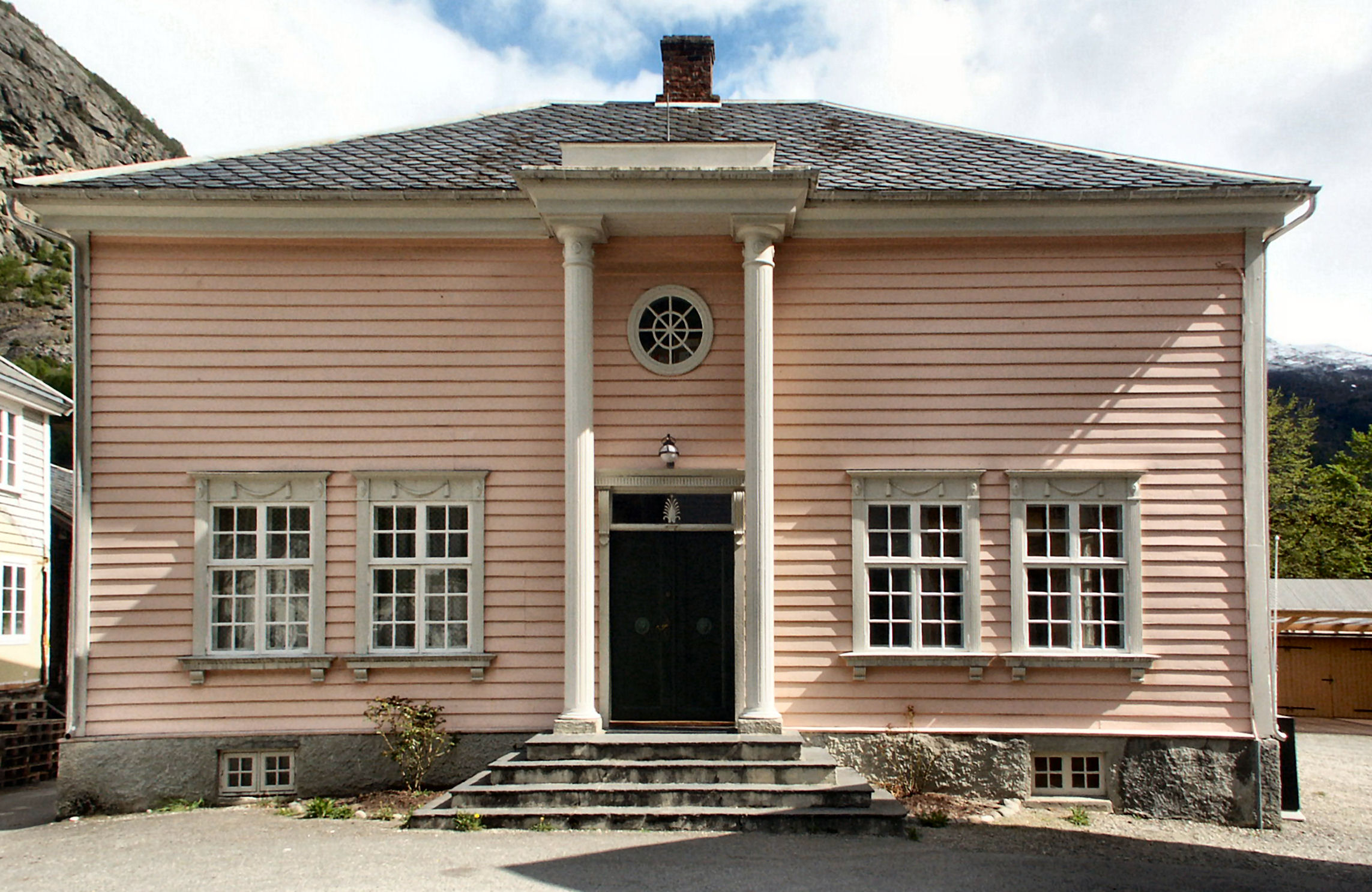
Another historic building
