= Michael Conrad Sophus Emil Aubert =

Norwegian politician

Michael Conrad Sophus Emil Aubert (2 July 1811 – 8 November 1872) was a Norwegian jurist and politician.

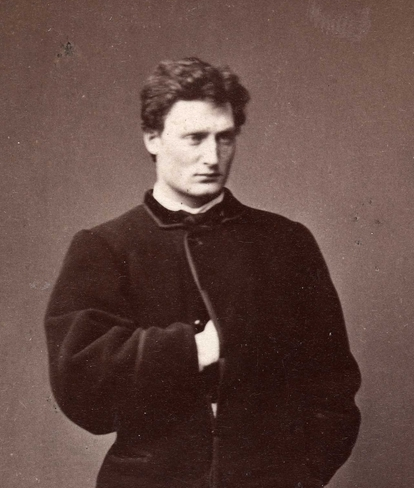
Emil Aubert - ca. 1860–1870 - Oslo Museum - OB.F03358A (cropped)

== Biography ==
Aubert was born in Christiania (now Oslo), Norway. He was one of ten children born to Benoni Aubert (1768–1832) and Jakobine Henriette Thaulow (1776-1833). One of his brother was professor Ludvig Cæsar Martin Aubert (1807–1887).

He graduated as cand.jur. in 1835. He worked as an attorney from 1836, and diocesan attorney (stiftprokurator) in Bergen from 1841. He was then appointed district stipendiary magistrate in Lofoten and Vesterålen in Nordland during 1847. While stationed here, he was elected to the Norwegian Parliament in 1851, representing the rural constituency of Nordlands Amt (now Nordland).

In 1852 he was appointed County Governor of Nordre Bergenhus Amt (now part of Vestland county). He served as deputy representative to the Parliament in 1857. He lived in Lærdalsøyri during this tenure.

He made an important contribution to the local economy by establishing a transport company with local merchant Jan Henrik Nitter Hansen (1801–1879) and priest Harald Ulrik Sverdrup (1813–1891). Founded in 1858, Nordre Bergenhus Amts Dampskibe (later known as Fylkesbaatane i Sogn og Fjordane) was established to provide steamship service from Bergen. With time the company came to operate ferries, charter service and tourist transportation.

He left the County Governor position in 1860 to become burgomaster of Throndhjem (now spelled Trondheim). He served as deputy representative from the constituency Throndhjem og Levanger.

From 1866, he resided at Sande Municipality. He was appointed district stipendiary magistrate in Jarlsberg (now Vestfold county) a position he held until his death. His replacement as burgomaster was Sivert Christensen Strøm.

Government offices
Preceded by Hans Tostrup	County Governor of Nordre Bergenhus amt 1852–1860	Succeeded by Johan Collett Falsen
