= Jean-Baptiste-Maurice Quinault =

- Born: 9 September 1687: Verdun, Three Bishoprics, France
- Died: 30 August 1745 (aged 57)
- Occupations: Comedian; Musician

Jean-Baptiste-Maurice Quinault (9 September 1687, Verdun – 30 August 1745, Gien) was an 18th-century French actor and musician.

The eldest son of actor Jean Quinault, he made his debut at the Comédie-Française 6 May 1712 in the part of Hippolyte in Racine's Phèdre. Received on 25 June, he played leading parts from 1718 only.

After he created numerous roles, he retired in 1734.

He also composed entertainments and interludes for theatre, including those of the Nouveau Monde, which were a great success. In 1729, he had Les Amours des déesses, ballet héroïque on a libretto by Louis Fuzelier played at the Académie royale de musique

The Regent granted him letters of nobility.
