= Louis Aubert (painter) =

French painter and composer

Louis Aubert, called le Fils, (15 May 1720, in Paris – c. 1800) was an 18th-century French painter and composer, active from 1740 to 1780. The violinist and composer Jacques Aubert was his father and Abbé Aubert (1731–1814) his brother.

== Works ==
=== Instrumental ===
- 1750: Sonates à Violon seul avec la Basse continue
- 1758: Six Symphonies à quatre, trois Violons obligés, avec Basse continue,

=== Paintings ===
- La Leçon de lecture, huile sur bois, 323 x 227 mm, 1740, Amiens, musée de Picardie
- Intérieur avec jeune femme pelotant la laine, graphite pencil, black chalk, chalk and colored chalk, pen and gray ink, 315 x 226 mm, 1746, Rijksmuseum Amsterdam
- Les Deux Artistes, 1747, Albertina, Vienna

== Bibliography ==
- Neil Jeffares, The Dictionary of pastellists before 1800, London, Unicorn Press, 2006
