= Elise Aubert =

Norwegian writer (1837–1909)

Elise Aubert (8 February 1837 – 30 November 1909) was a Norwegian novelist, short-story writer, and non-fiction writer.

== Biography ==
Elise Sofie Aars was born in Lier Municipality in Buskerud county, Norway. She was the daughter of priest and politician Nils Fredrik Julius Aars (1807–65) and Sofie Elisabeth Stabel (1813–86). She grew up in rectories located in Alta Municipality in Finnmark and Lom Municipality in Gudbrandsdalen.

She married professor and government minister Ludvig Mariboe Benjamin Aubert. Among their children were jurist Vilhelm Mariboe Aubert (1868–1908) and film critic Sofie Aubert Lindbæk (1875–1953).

During the 1870s, Aubert delivered short stories, articles, and serials to newspapers, signing with the pseudonyms "Tante Dorthe" or "E-e". Some of these were collected and released as the book Fra Hovedstaden i Syttiaarene in 1892.

Her novels include Dagny (1882) and Bølgeslag (1886). Aubert published the memoir Fra de gamle Prestegaarde (From the Old Vicarages) in 1902.

After her death in 1909, a selection of her letters and diaries (Fra Krinoline-Tiden. Elise Auberts Ungdomsbreve og Dagbøker) were edited and published in 1921 by her daughter, Sofie Lindbæk.

== Selected works ==
- Hjemmefra. Fortællinger for de Unge (1878)
- Kirsten. En Fortælling (1880)
- Et Juleminde (1881)
- Stedbarnet. Fortælling (1889)
- Forfængelighed. Fortælling (1890)
- Fjeldfolk. To Fortællinger (1893)
- Dage som svandt (1903)
- Glimt (1904)
- Tidens tegn (1906)

== Other sources ==
- Aubert, Elise (2012) Fra Krinoline-tiden: Elise Auberts Ungdomsbreve Og Dagbøker (Nabu Press) ISBN 978-1277136524
