= Andreas Aubert (art historian) =

Norwegian art educator, art historian and art critic

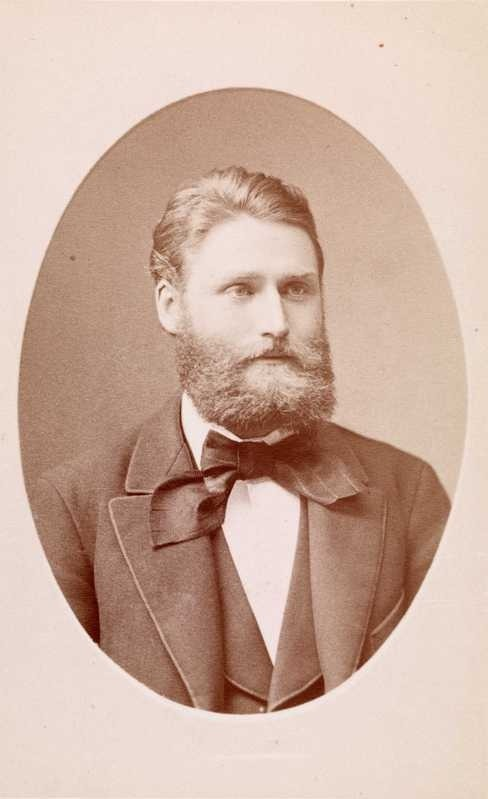
Andreas Aubert, c. 1870s

Fredrik Ludvig Andreas Vibe Aubert (28 January 1851 – 10 May 1913) was a Norwegian art educator, art historian and art critic.

== Biography ==
Andreas Aubert was the second son of Ludvig Cæsar Martin Aubert (1807-1877), a classical scholar and professor of philology at the University of Oslo. His elder brother Ludvig Mariboe Benjamin Aubert (1838-1896) became a jurist and professor. His sister-in-law was novelist Elise Aubert (1837- 1909).

Aubert married Martha Johanne Védastine Moe (1855–1933), daughter of Bishop Jørgen Moe (1813-1882) and sister of writer Moltke Moe (1859-1913).

Andreas Aubert was a student at the Norwegian National Academy of Craft and Art Industry (1869–71), before he began to study theology. He studied theology cand.theol. (1877) and then worked as a teacher at Aars og Voss' skole (1878–1895). He was also employed as an art critic at Morgenbladet, Aftenposten and Dagbladet.

Aubert wrote extensively about Norwegian artist, Johan Christian Dahl, starting with an autobiography titled Professor Dahl. Et stykke af Aarhundredets Kunst- og Kulturhistorie in 1893.

His major works in art history were fundamental studies of the art of Johan Christian Dahl. Because of his work, he was awarded an annual government scholarship in 1895. He was able to stop teaching and became a professional art historian, critic, and researcher.

Aubert also championed Edvard Munch, Puvis de Chavannes, Arnold Böcklin, Max Klinger, Gabriel von Max, and Vilhelm Hammershøi. He described them as "neurasthenics", by which he meant that their art was oriented toward the psychological. Toward the end of the 19th century, he had an important role in restoring the legacy of German Romantic painter Caspar David Friedrich. The painter is now considered the leading artist of that period.

== Selected works ==
- Professor Dahl. Et stykke af Aarhundredets Kunst- og Kulturhistorie (1893)
- Den Norske Naturfølelse og Professor Dahl. Hans Kunst og dens Stilling i Aarhundredets Utvikling (1894)
- Thomas Fearnley. En biografisk skisse (1903)
- Runge und die Romantik, Berlin 1909 (no. ed. Runge og romantikken, 1911).
- Caspar David Friedrich. Gott, Freiheit, Vaterland, aus dem Nachlass des Verfassers hrsg. von G. J. Kern, Berlin 1915.
- Norsk kultur og norsk kunst with C. W. Schnitler, (1917)
- Maleren Johan Christian Dahl. Et stykke av forrige aarhundres kunst- og kulturhistorie (1920)

== Other sources ==
- Mosley, Philip. Rodenbach, Georges: Critical Essays. Fairleigh Dickinson University Press, 1996, p. 158 (note 33). ISBN 0-8386-3588-1.
