= Marc-Antoine Legrand =

Marc-Antoine Legrand or Le Grand (30 January 1673, Paris – 7 January 1728) was a 17th–18th-century French actor and playwright.

== Biography ==
The son of a surgeon at the Hôtel des Invalides, Legrand started very early his acting career, first in Lyon in 1692 in the company of Marshall de Villeroy and made a first attempt at the Comédie-Française 19 March 1694 but was not received. After a stay in Warsaw at the court of John III Sobieski, he returned to the Comédie-Française 21 March 1702 and was received 18 October.

Disgraced by nature, he one day harangued the audience by throwing "Gentlemen, it is easier for you to accustom yourself to my face, that for me to change it."

If he never gave up the stage (he even played the role of Maître Robert in his last play Les Amazones modernes in 1727, written in collaboration with Louis Fuzelier), he devoted part of his time to writing theater plays (forty in all), sometimes to the Comédie française, sometimes to the Comedie Italienne, and once even for a Théâtre de la foire, the opéra comique, Les Animaux raisonnables, 1717. Le Roi de Cocagne (1718) is usually considered to be his masterpiece.

While he was composing the play Cartouche ou les voleurs (1721), he pushed the sake of realism as far as visiting in prison the famous brigand to document the argot.

== Bibliography ==
=== Studies on Legrand ===
- Burnet, Mary Scott, Marc-Antoine Legrand, acteur et auteur comique, Paris, Droz, 1938.
- Lauro, Carlo, 'Foire' et utopia nel teatro di M.-A. Legrand, Schena editore, 1985.

=== Plays by Legrand ===
- Œuvres de Le Grand, comédien du roi, Paris, Libraires associés, 1770 (4 vol.)
- Œdipe travesti et Agnès de Chaillot (en collaboration avec Pierre-François Biancolelli, dit Dominique) dans Parodies du nouveau Théâtre-Italien, Paris, Briasson, 1738 (vol. 1).

=== External links ===
- Marc-Antione Legrand on data.bnf.fr
- List of his plays on CÉSAR
- biographical notice in Dictionnaire portatif historique et littéraire des théâtres by Antoine de Léris
