= Jean-François Regnard =

French poet (1655–1709)

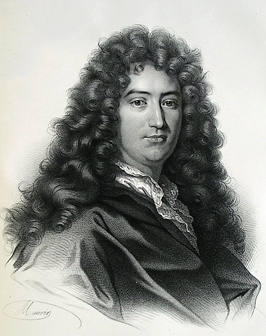
- Born: February 7, 1655; Paris, France
- Died: September 4, 1709 (aged 54); Château de Grillon, near Dourdan, France
- Occupations: Dramatist; playwright; traveler
- Known for: Comic plays as a successor to Molière; travel writings from Lapland and other voyages
- Notable work: Le Joueur (1696), Le Légataire universel (1708)

Jean-François Regnard (7 February 1655 – 4 September 1709) was a French dramatist and poet, born in Paris, who is equally famous now for the travel diary he kept of a voyage in 1681. He has been described as "the most distinguished, after Molière, of the comic poets of the seventeenth century".

== Life ==
Regnard inherited a fortune from his father, a successful merchant who had given him an excellent classical education; he then increased it, he affirms, by gambling. He took to traveling, and on a return voyage from Italy in 1678 was at the age of twenty-two captured by an Algerian pirate, sold as a slave in Algiers and taken to Constantinople, where the French consul paid ransom for his release. He went on traveling, undaunted. His Voyage de Flandre et de Hollande, commencé le 26 avril 1681. reporting his trip through the Low Countries, Denmark and Sweden, where he dallied at the courts of Christian V and Charles XI and then north to Lapland, returning through Poland, Hungary and Germany to France, is mined by social historians. The section often published on its own, his Voyage de Laponie, largely inspired by Johannes Schefferus, describes the way of life of the Sami of Lapland; it was not published until 1731, when its description of the backwardness and simplicity of the Sami people, their curious pagan customs, alcohol addiction and untidy lifestyle, introduced these strangers to cultured Europe. In a 2025 study, the historian Jaska Kainulainen features Voyage de Laponie as one of four historical texts showing that early modern southern European travelers used the far North (including Lapland) not just as a place to describe, but as an exoticized, hazardous stage on which to present themselves as brave, exceptional observers. Kainulainen believes Voyage is not just a description of Lapland; it also reflects Regnard's own endurance. He notes that Regnard shows the region as populated yet isolated and harsh and emphasizes the scarcity of food, the abundance of insects, and the difficulties of travel. These elements, Kainulainen states, help portray Regnard as a bold and inquisitive traveler.

After his return to Paris he purchased a sinecure in the Treasury that required no attention, and wrote farces and skits for the Théâtre des italiens, 1688–96. After inheriting his mother's considerable fortune in 1693, he devoted the time divided between his hôtel in Paris and his country house, the château of Grillon, near Dourdan, to writing comedies in verse for the Comédie française, twenty-three in total, the best of them being Le Joueur ("The Gamester", 1696), Le Distrait (1697), Les Ménechmes (1705), and his masterwork, Le Légataire universel ("The residuary legatee" [1706]), following closely in the steps of Molière. He was admired by Boileau.

He died at his château of Grillon in 1709.
