= Ebba d'Aubert =

Ebba d'Aubert, née Bergström (1819–1860) was a Swedish concert pianist.

She was married to the second concert conductor at the Kungliga Hovkapellet, violinist Eduard d'Aubert. She became an Associé of the Royal Swedish Academy of Music in 1849.
