= Ludvig Aubert =

Norwegian professor, jurist and government official

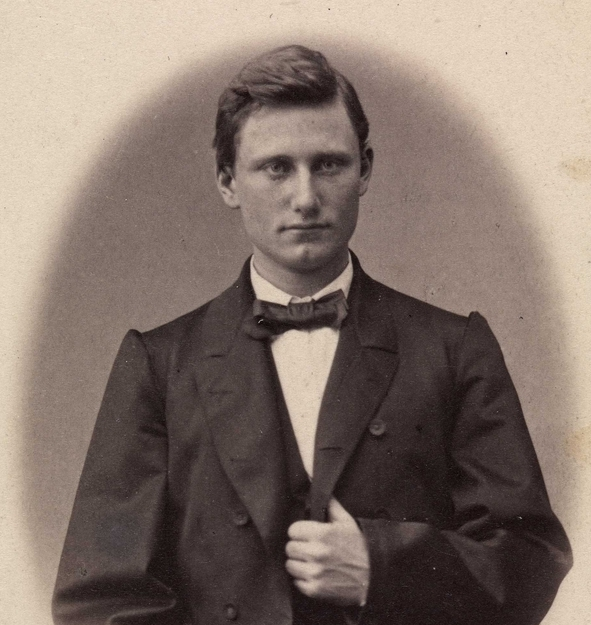
- Aubert in ca. 1860 or 1870.

Minister of Justice
- In office 3 April 1884 – 26 June 1884
- Prime Minister: Christian Schweigaard
- Preceded by: Christian Schweigaard
- Succeeded by: Aimar Sørenssen

Personal details
- Born: Ludvig Mariboe Benjamin Aubert; 22 November 1838 Christiania, Sweden-Norway
- Died: 5 February 1896 (aged 57) Christiania, Sweden-Norway
- Spouse: Elise Aubert
- Children: Vilhelm Mariboe Aubert; Bille Aubert; Sofie Aubert

Ludvig Mariboe Benjamin Aubert (22 November 1838 – 5 February 1896) was a Norwegian professor, jurist and government official.

== Biography ==
Aubert was born at Christiania (now Oslo), Norway. He was the son of professor Ludvig Cæsar Martin Aubert (1807-1887) and his wife Ida Dorothea Mariboe (1811–1900). Aubert's brother was art educator and historian Fredrik Ludvig Andreas Vibe Aubert (1851–1913).

From 1855, Aubert was a law student at the University of Christiania (now University of Oslo) graduating Cand.jur. in 1860. He started his career as a magistrate at Nord-Gudbrandsdal District Court. Aubert was engaged as a university fellow and in 1864 became a lecturer. Aubert was a professor of law at the University of Oslo from 1866. He published noted works of legal history, comparative law and commercial law.

A moderate Conservative, Aubert also served as Minister of Justice from April to June 1884 with the Schweigaard Government.

Aubert was married to noted author Elise Sofie Aars (1837–1909). Among their children were jurist Vilhelm Mariboe Aubert (1868-1908) and film critic Sofie Aubert Lindbæk (1875–1953).
