= Abbé Aubert =

French writer (1731–1814)

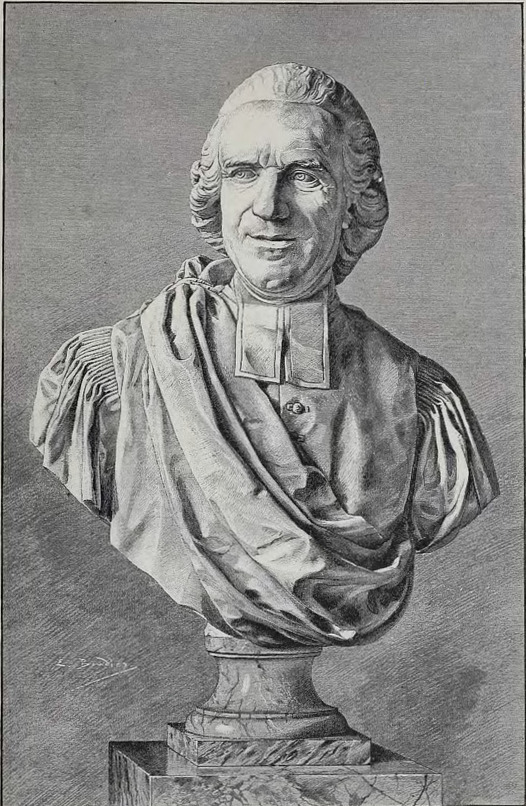
- portrait bust by Jean Guillaume Moitte
- Born: 15 February 1731; Paris
- Died: 10 November 1814; Paris
- Education: College of Navarre
- Occupations: Journalist, professor, writer, fabulist, theologian, literary scholar
- Employer: Collège de France (1773–1784)

Jean-Louis Aubert (15 February 1731 in Paris – 10 November 1814 in Paris), called the Abbé Aubert, was a French dramatist, poet and journalist, son of the violinist and composer Jacques Aubert (1686-1753) and brother of Louis Aubert (painter). Aubert was educated at the Collège de Navarre and entered the order. In 1741, Aubert entered the editorial staff of the Affiches Annonces et Avis Divers, where he was literary critic. In 1752, he created the Affiches et Annonces de Province. He opposed the encyclopedists.

Aubert published Fables in the Mercure de France and in 1756 Fables nouvelles. Grimm found his fables "just good for children, not being allowed to be too difficult"; Voltaire on the contrary recommended them. 1761-1763 appeared the Contes moraux sur les tableaux de Greuze, 1765 Mort d'Abel and Vœu de Jephté. A protégé of Vergennes, Aubert joined the Journal de Trévoux, replacing the abbé Mercier, which he renamed the Journal des Sciences. In 1773, he was made chair of literature at the Collège Royal and replaced Marin as director of the Gazette de France in 1774.

Aubert wrote essays of the Critiques of Voltaire and published the Ode aux poètes du tems sur les louanges ridicules dont ils fatiguent Louis XVI (Paris, 1774), Parallèle de l’importance des opinions religieuses de Necker et de la religion considérée de Mme de Genlis (Paris, 1788), Mon échatillon (poems, Paris year VIII) and Traits de l’histoire universelle (Amsterdam, 1760-1762)
