= Vilhelm Mariboe Aubert =

Norwegian jurist

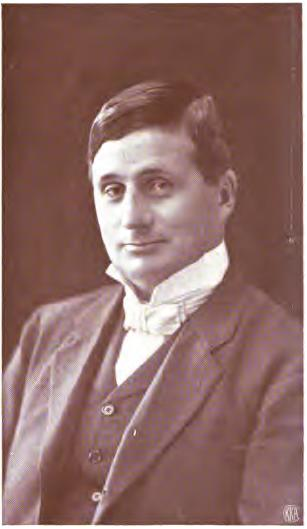
- Born: 29 December 1868; Oslo, Norway
- Died: 20 June 1908 (aged 39); Stanleyville, Congo Free State
- Other name: Bille Aubert
- Education: University of Christiania
- Occupation: jurist

Vilhelm Mariboe Aubert (29 December 1868 – 20 June 1908 ), commonly known by his nickname "Bille" Aubert, was a Norwegian jurist.

== Personal life ==
Aubert was born in Christiania (now Oslo), Norway. He was a son of the professor Ludvig Mariboe Benjamin Aubert (1838–1896) and author Elise Aubert (1837–1909). Aubert"s sister was author Sofie Aubert Lindbæk (1875–1953).

== Career ==
Aubert studied law at the University of Christiania where he was founding chairman of the Conservative Students' Association (Den Konservative Studenterforening) in 1891. He was also widely known as a speaker in the Norwegian Students' Society. In 1904, he was pronounced judge in Congo. Aubert died during 1908 in Stanleyville. From Congo, he wrote several letters to Norwegian newspapers, which were published together in a 1908 book titled Breve fra Kongo.

== Works ==
- Breve Fra Kongo Og Andetstedsfra (1908)
