= Ludvig Cæsar Martin Aubert =

Norwegian philologist

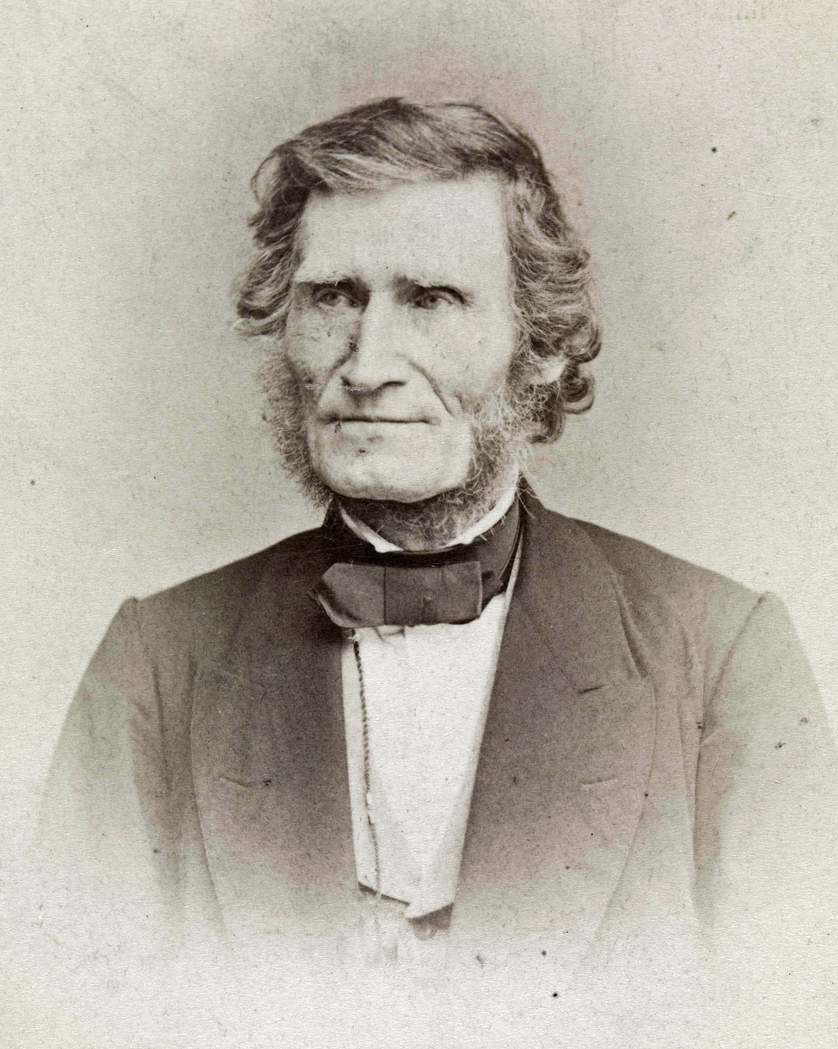
Ludvig Cæsar Martin Aubert

Ludvig Cæsar Martin Aubert (30 March 1807 – 14 June 1887) was a Norwegian philologist.

== Biography ==
Aubert was born in Christianssand (now Kristiansand), Norway. He was the son of Benoni Aubert (1768–1832) and Jakobine Henriette Thaulow (1776–1833). His brother Michael Conrad Sophus Emil Aubert (1811–1872) became a jurist and was County Governor of Nordre Bergenhus Amt (now Sogn og Fjordane).

Aubert had an academic career. He was a professor of Latin philology at the Royal Frederick University from 1840 to 1875. His main work, Den latinske Verbalflexion, is largely obsolete.

Aubert and his wife Ida Dorothea Mariboe (1811–1900) had two sons who also became academics: Fredrik Ludvig Andreas Vibe Aubert (1851–1913), an art educator and historian; and Ludvig Mariboe Benjamin Aubert (1838–1896), a professor.
